= Breac Maodhóg =

Medieval Irish reliquary

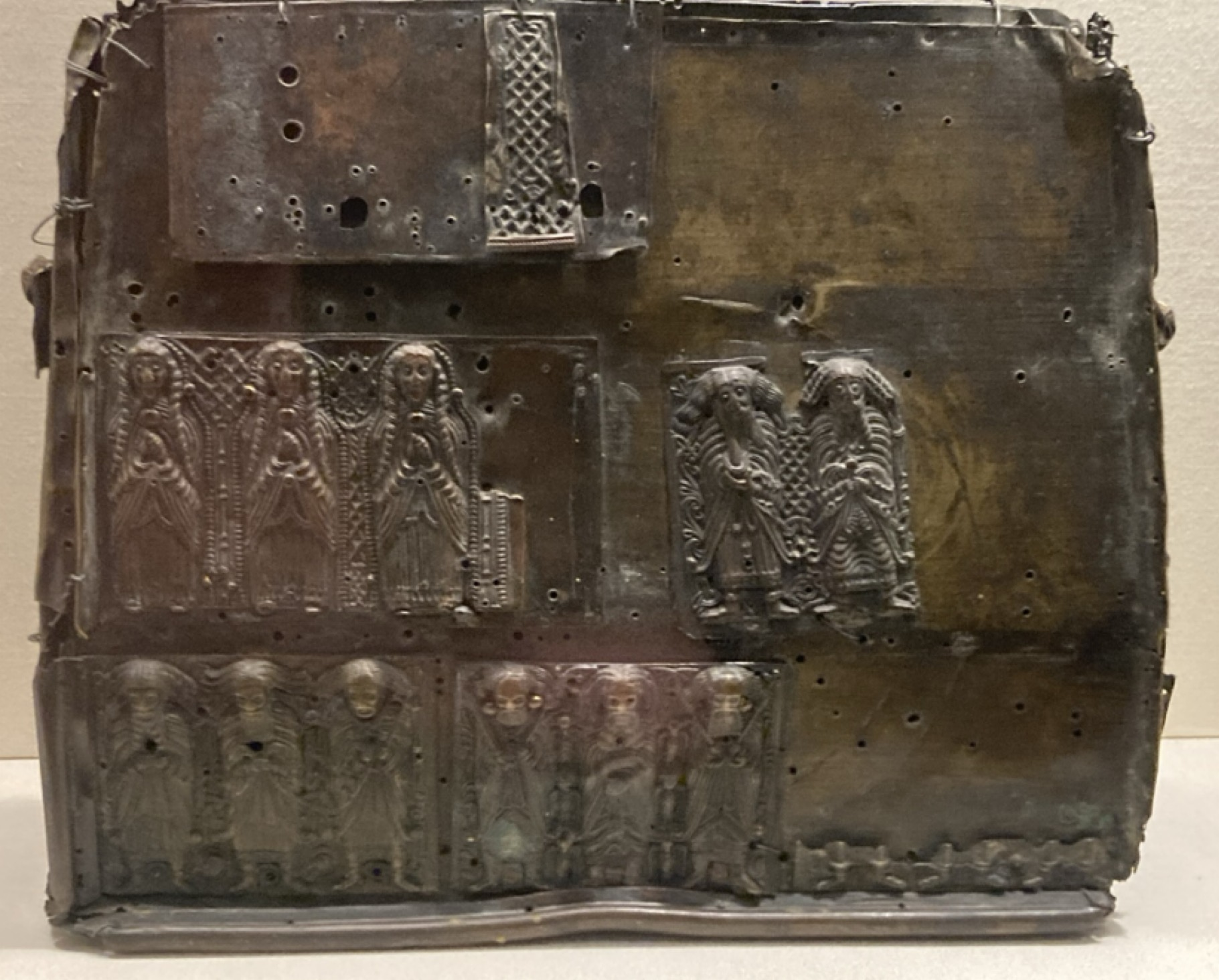
- The shrine’s front face
- Material: Gilt copper alloy, enamel
- Size: height 180 mm (7 in), width 200 mm (8 in), 76 mm (3 in)
- Created: 11th century
- Discovered: Drumlane Church, Drumlane
- Present location: National Museum of Ireland, Dublin
- Identification: P1021

The Breac Maodhóg (English: Speckled Shrine of Saint Maodhóg) is an Irish house-shaped shrine thought to date from the second half of the 11th century. It is made from large plates of bronze on a wooden base, on which are a series of figures in high-relief on bronze plaques.

At a height of 180 mm (7 in) and a width of 200 mm (8 in), the Breac Maodhóg is large compared to other House-shaped shrines. It was likely commissioned to carry a relic of the 6th-century bishop Máedóc of Ferns, and its original leather satchel has survived. It was later kept in a late-medieval leather satchel.

It is in very poor condition, and significant parts of the figurative metalwork are lost. It has been in the collection of the National Museum of Ireland, Kildare Street, Dublin since 1890.

== Máedóc of Ferns ==
Staint Máedóc of Ferns was born c. 555 at Magh Slécht in today's County Cavan. He is thought to have been tenth in descent from Colla Uais, King of Ireland c. 336. Moedoc's name is a compound of three Irish words, "Mo", "Aodh" and "Oc" (or Og), which translate as "My little fire".

== Function ==
The earliest House-shaped reliquaries date from 8th-century Ireland and typically consist of a rectangular metal box capped with a steeply pitched roof and gable ends. They are believed to have been constructed to hold relics of saints or martyrs from the early Celtic Church.

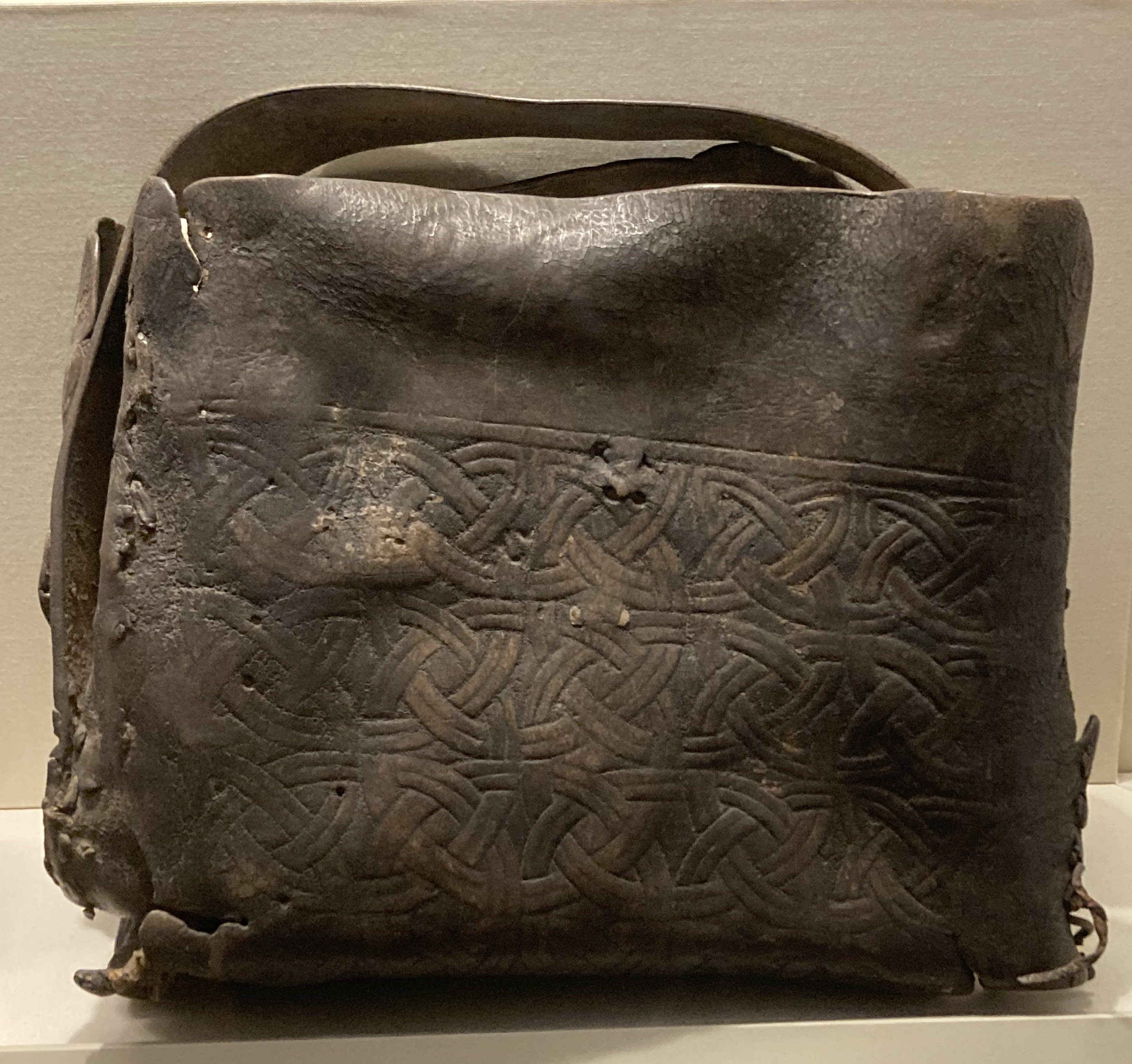
The leater satchel used to carry the shrine

The Breac Maodhóg may have served as a battle standard as with the Cathach of St. Columba (Battler of Columba), which was carried onto the battlefield by a cleric to protect the troops and perhaps bring victory. A medieval text recording the life of the patron saint of the kings of Leinster, St Maedoc of Ferns, records how the kings of Breifne sought that "the famous wonder-working Breac [was] carried thrice around them" during battle.

The shrine's leather satchel (or case) survives, although it was produced much later. Such cases were used to carry shrines from place to place through the districts of their patron saints. The satchel has broad leather straps fastened at each end, allowing it to be worn around the neck. According to the Irish antiquarian Margaret Stokes, travelling reliquaries were known as "Menistirs", while their leather cases were known as "Polaires" or "Tiaga". One of the satchel's long sides contains interlaced designs and triangular and circular knotwork.

== Description ==
The Breac Maodhóg is constructed from a series of copper-alloy sheets bound with copper strips and fastened by rivets. Unlike earlier Insular reliquaries, including most house-shaped shrines and croziers, it lacks an inner wooden core. With a height of 7 in (180 mm) and a width of 8 in (200 mm), it is much larger than all of the other (all of which are earlier) known house-shaped shrines.

The shrine is in poor condition. A number of figures are missing from the front plate. There is evidence that it was dismantled at some point and then reassembled, according to the archaeologist Griffin Murray, "inexpertly" with modern wire, resulting in the loss of some rivets.

=== Front plate ===
The front plate originally consisted of twenty-one figures, arranged in three registers (or "orders"). Of these, eleven are extant on the lower and middle registers, while only the feet of three figures on the upper register survive.

Many of the figures resemble the evangelists in the earlier Soiscél Molaisse, although, according to art historian Patrick Wallace, those on the Breac Maodhóg are "invested with a deeper humanity, character and humour. The wool-clad, tuniced, and cloaked, bearded and long-haired figures seem almost to invite the viewer back to the early twelfth century."

==== Lower register ====
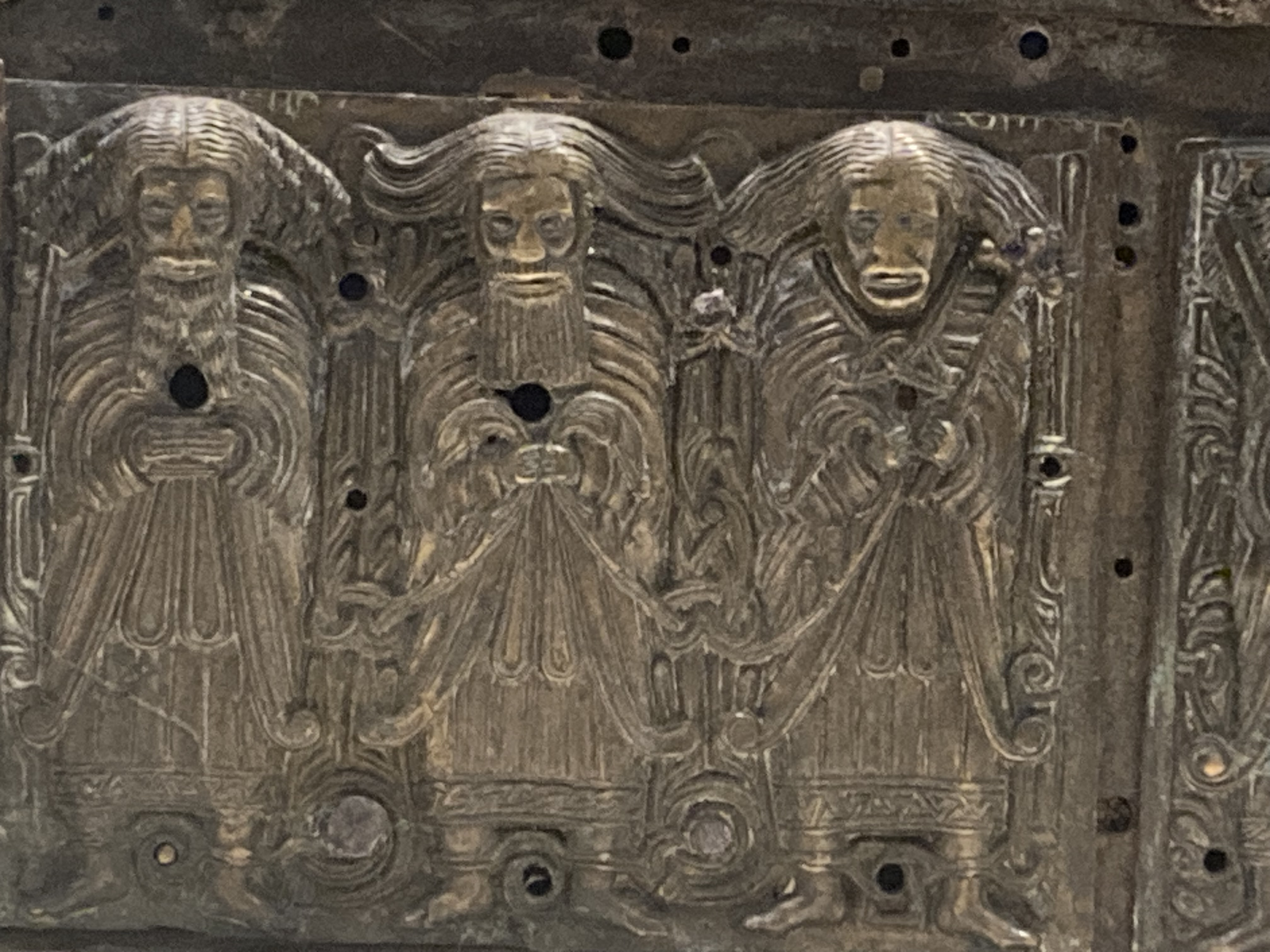
Plaque one on the lower left-hand side

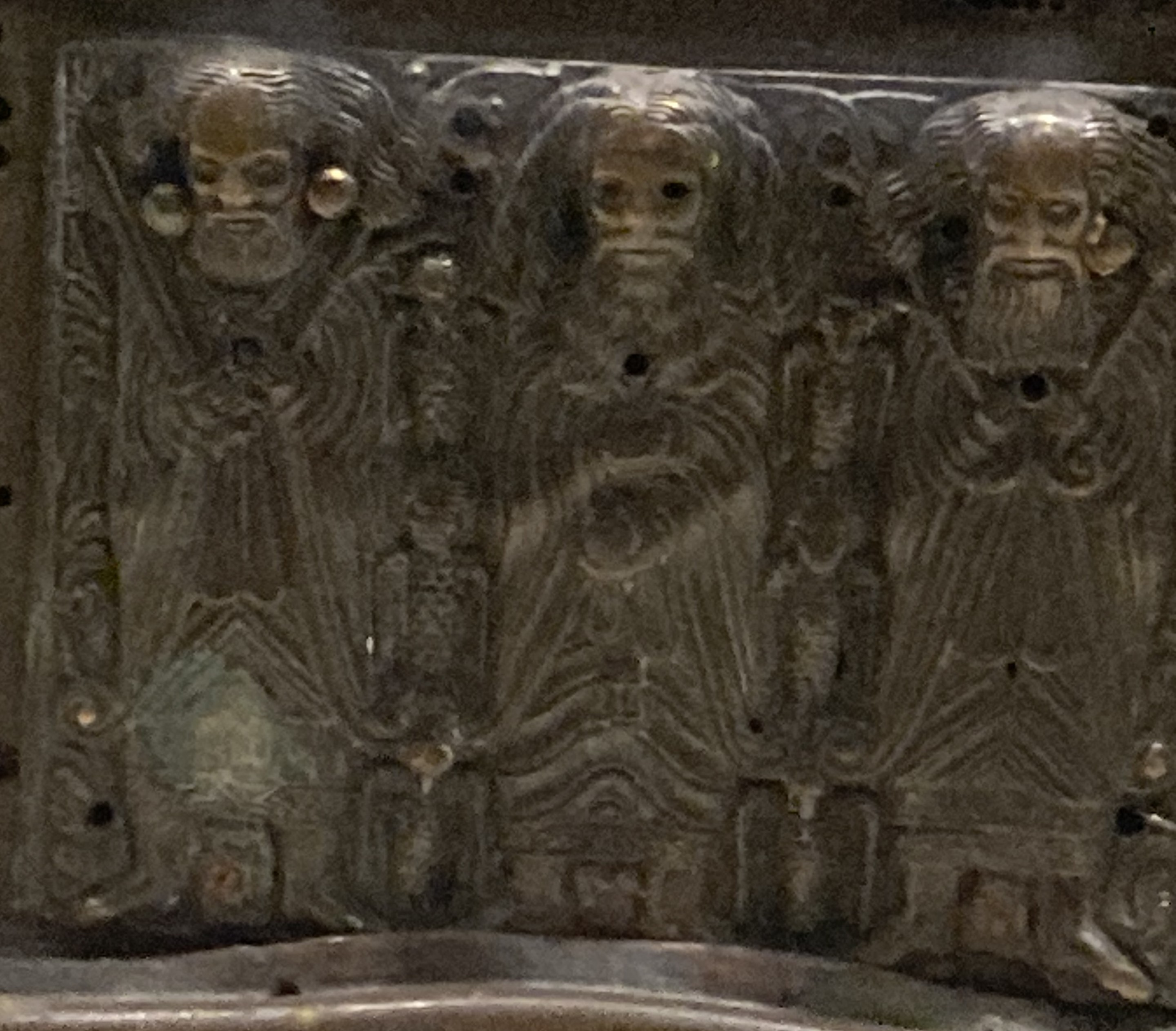
Plaque two on the lower right-hand side

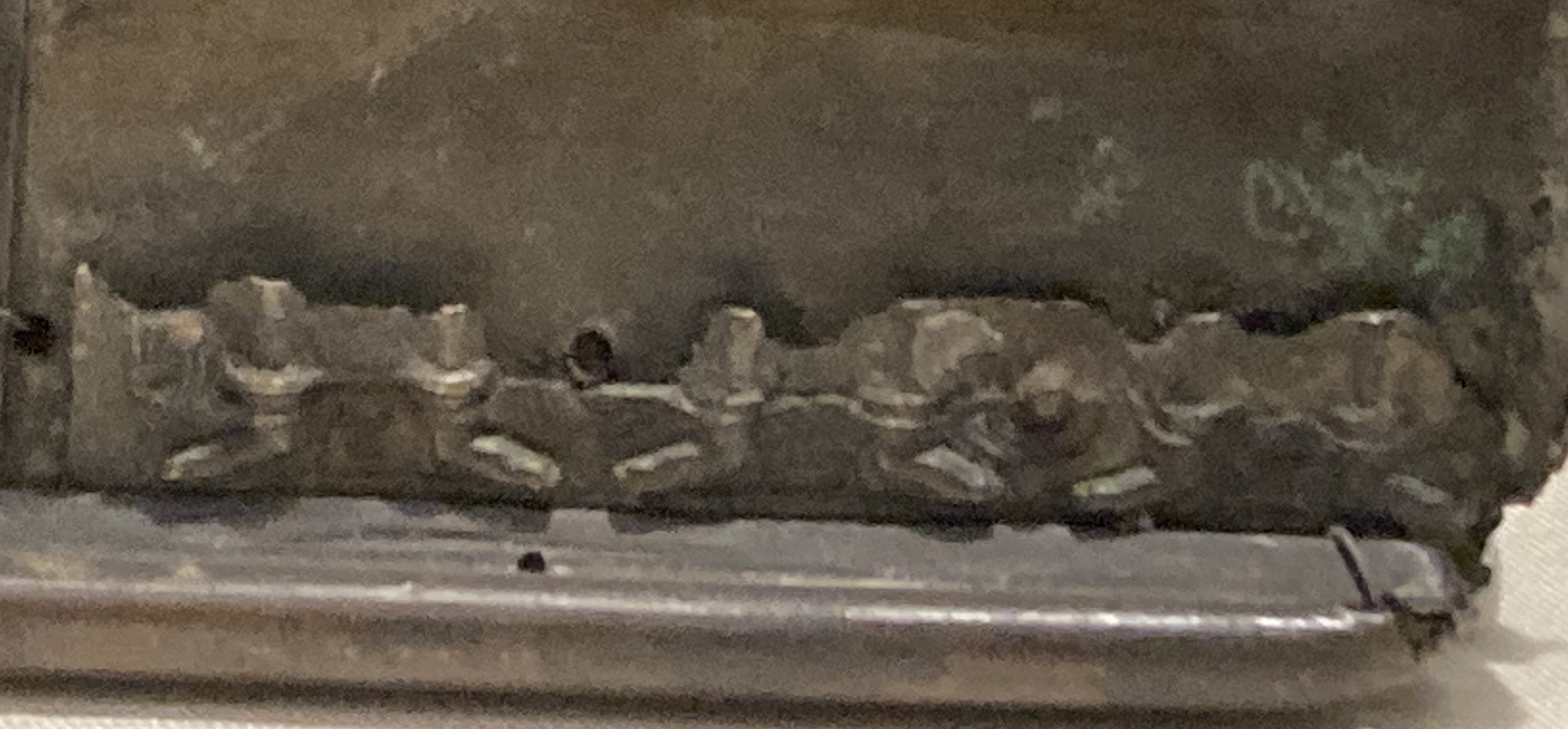
Remants of plaque three

The six male figures in the lower register are cast in pale bronze and finished with gold foil. They are arranged in two groups of three, with one figure from the right-hand group now lost. The men are highly individualised, with distinct facial features, expressions and outwardly pointing feet. They all have long, elaborate and distinct hairstyles and wear luxurious clothing; in particular, the folds of their flowing robes are highly detailed. The plaques are in part attached to the reliquary by a modern wire.

The feet of the men on the left-hand group are separated by large spirals. The first figure has a long, wavy and orked beard and combed, parted hair that becomes ringlets on each side of his head. He holds a book clutched at his chest. The hem of his robe contains fretwork patterns. The second figure has long, swept-back hair and a beard. His head is slightly tilted to the left. He holds two fronds extending from the surrounding vegetation, and his hem is decorated with a continuous knotted pattern. The third figure is clean-shaven and has long wavy hair; two long hair strands are tied beneath his chin. He carries a frond in his right hand and a cross staff with rounded terminals in his left. The hem of his robe is similar to that of the first figure.

A single vegetal scroll runs along the base and over the ankles of each of the three figures. It forms a spiral between the first two figures, and an angular knot between the second and third men. Large spirals appear at the base of the spaces separating the figures, from which two strands emerge, intertwining and knotting before ending in a lobed form flanked by smaller strands.

The figures differ in hairstyle, beard, and attributes. The first holds what appears to be a book, the second carries two plant fronds, and the third holds a frond and a cross staff. Their robes are edged with different decorative patterns. Above their heads are traces of inscriptions that are now unreadable. The plaque is loosely attached to the reliquary with a modern wire.

The second plaque is made of gunmetal brass. The figures are separated by columns of birds. The left-hand figure holds a sword in one hand and a book in the other. The sceptres of the second and third men hold leaves that have spread into vegetative patterns around them. This running vegetal scroll extends along the lower border of the plaque and over the three men's ankles. There are spiral patterns between the feet of the first two figures, and a knot between those of the third, as well as a large spiral between each of the figures. The figures have empty plaques above their heads, which presumably contained inscriptions or lettering to identify them. The art historian Peter Harbison suggested that the balding figure holding a sword on plaque two may be St Paul.

The third plaque on the lower register is now missing, with only three pairs of feet, the hem of the robe of the first man and a running vegetal scroll remaining.

==== Middle register ====
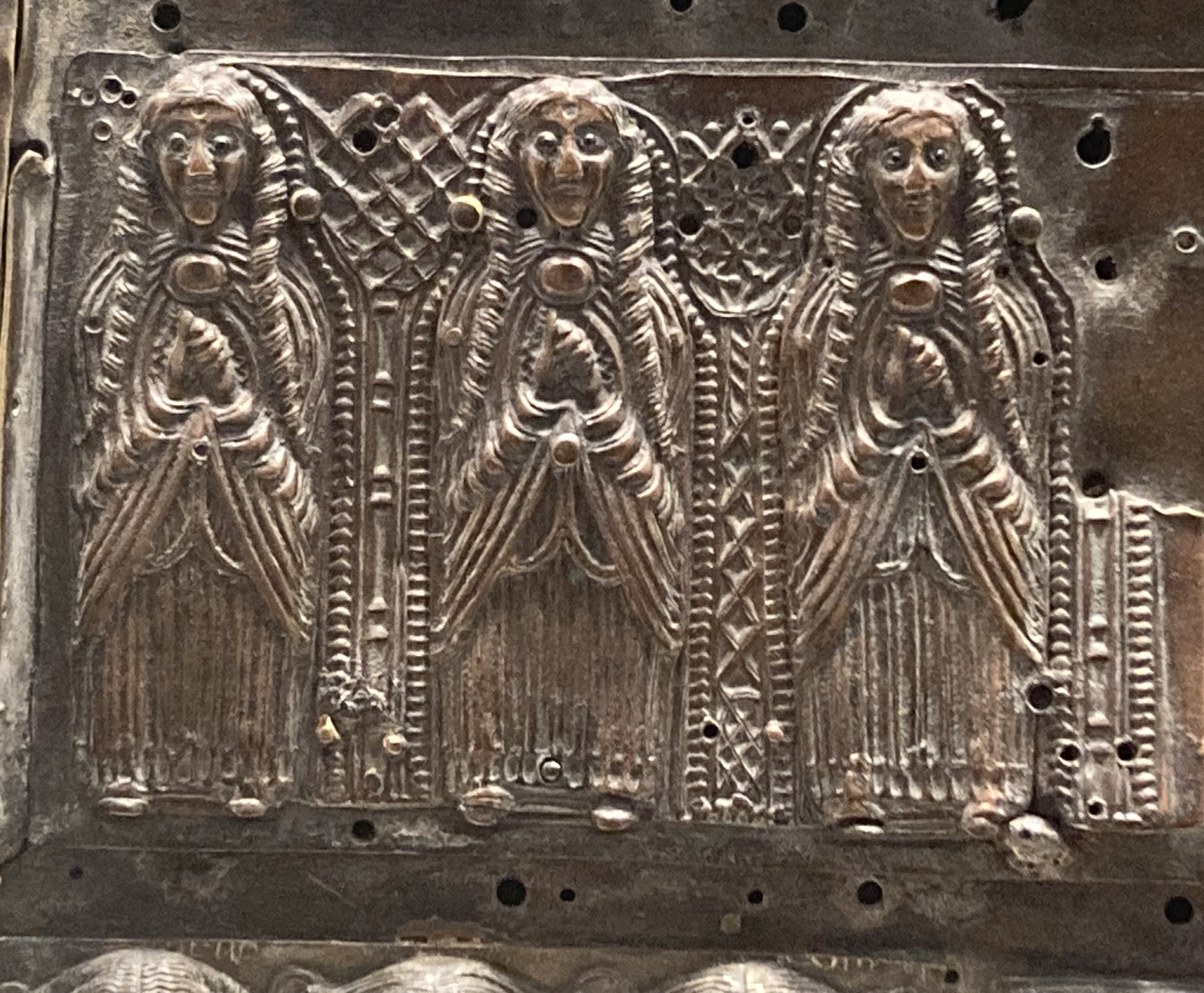
Female figures on the middle left (plaque 4)

The three nearly identical women in the middle register are assumed to be saints. The figures were cast as a single piece, while a fourth figure on the right is now lost. The surviving female figures are positioned within arcades and have their hands clasped in prayer at their chests.

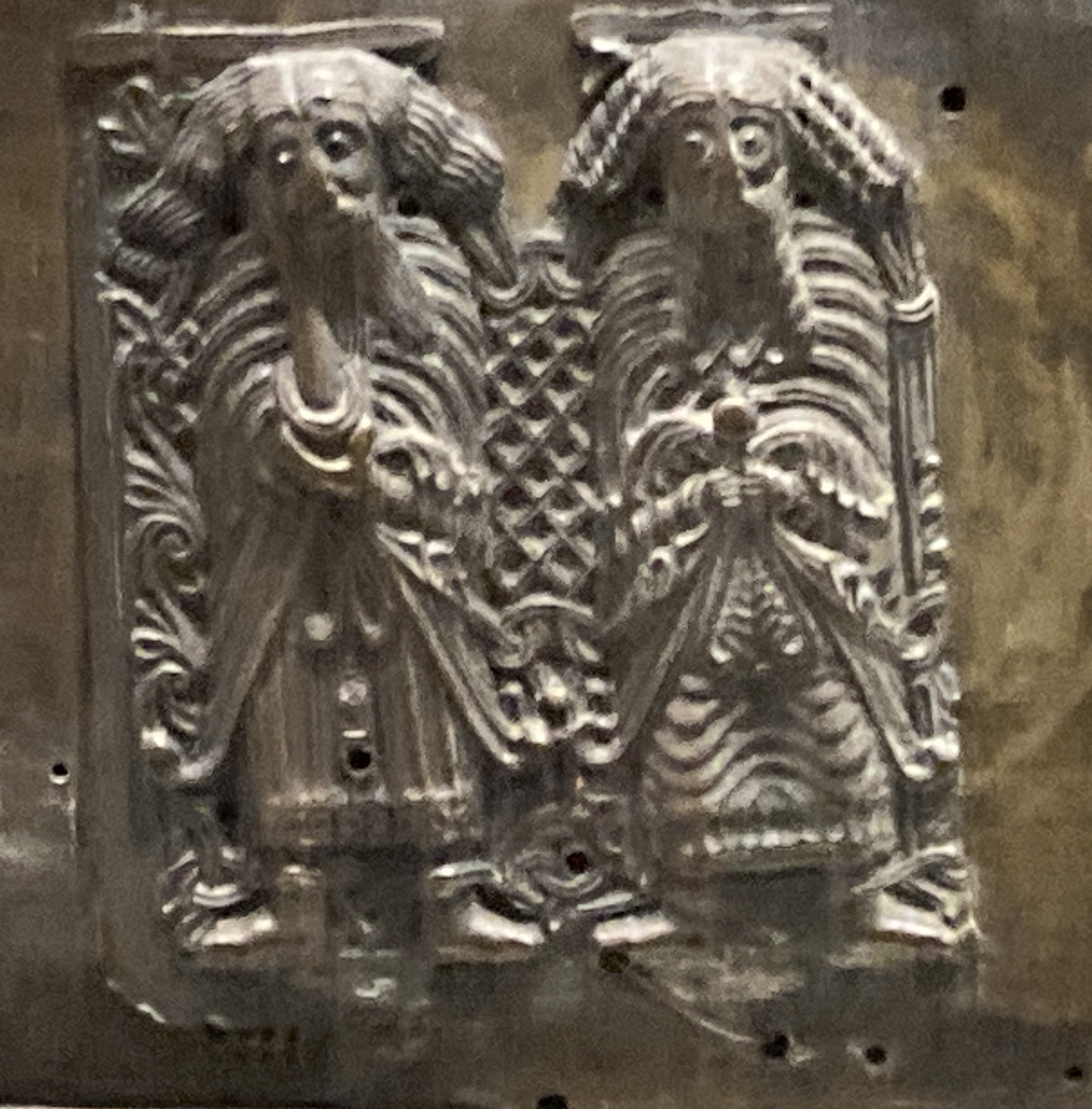
Male figures on the middle right (plaque 5)

The right-hand side contains two male figures. The figure on the left has a melancholy expression, drooping eyes and holds his head in one hand as if sighing.

=== Side plates ===
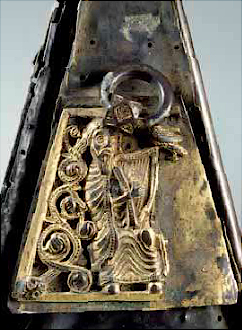
The harpist depicted on one of the shrine's gables

Each of the two gable side plates has a carrying ring consisting of a copper alloy lug held in place by rivets.

The seated musician on one of the short-sides is playing what is considered the oldest extant visual representation of a harp. His legs are shown frontally, while his upper torso is in profile, and his head is turned to the left. His jaw rests on top of the harp. The figure has a beard and long, wavy hair, which blends into the surrounding foliage. He has a long, flowing beard. He wears a long robe that falls at his feet in layered horizontal folds.

=== Reverse and base plates ===
Both the back and end of the shrine contain multiple small rectangular crosses pierced into the bronze sheets. Similar cross-shaped patterns can be found on the least religiously significant sides of several other 11th-century Irish shrines, including the Cathach and the Shrine of Miosach.

The border of the reverse is heavily damaged, with only three fragments surviving. The fragments contain a red enamel background, with bronze-gilt margins, knots, and decorated square elements. The decoration consists of small mould-cast glass squares arranged in a blue, red, blue, white sequence.

== Provenance ==
During the early modern period, the Breac Maodhóg was thought to have originated at Drumlane monastery, County Cavan. Its first known mention is in a 15th-century "Life of the saint" of Maodhóg, which mentions donation to the village of Rossinver, County Leitrim by the Bishop of Ferns in County Wexford. The saint is also thought to have left the monastery two hand-bells, recorded as the "bell of the hours" and the "bell of the brooch" .

The shrine's modern provenance is unclear. An early 19th-century account notes that the shrine was kept in Drumlane for centuries until "stolen in the present century from the Roman Catholic priest of that parish". When first rediscovered, its hereditary keepers were the O'Farrelly family.

Both the shrine and 15th-century satchel were in the possession of the antiquarian George Petrie by the early 1840s. His records include an entry noting how the shrine was held with another object "called the little Breacmaog, in his church in Drumlane, Co. Cavan, and was purchased from the hereditary keepers by Mr. Reilly, a jeweller, a Cavan man, who sold it to Dr Petrie".

Both objects entered the National Museum of Ireland in 1890, during the transfer of the Royal Irish Academy's collection.

== Sources ==
- Crawford, Henry (1923). "A Descriptive List of Irish Shrines and Reliquaries. Part I". The Journal of the Royal Society of Antiquaries of Ireland. 13 (1). JSTOR 25513282.
- Harbison, Peter (1999). The Golden Age of Irish Art: The Medieval Achievement 600-1200. London: Thames & Hudson. ISBN 0-5000-1927-4.
- Laing, Lloyd (2006). The Archaeology of Celtic Britain and Ireland: C.AD 400 - 1200. Cambridge: Cambridge University Press. ISBN 978-0-5218-3862-7.
- Lucas, Anthony (1986). "The Social Role of Relics and Reliquaries in Ancient Ireland". The Journal of the Royal Society of Antiquaries of Ireland. 116. JSTOR 25508904.
- Lucas, Anthony (1974). Treasures of Ireland: Irish Pagan & Early Christian Art. New York: Viking Press. ISBN 0-6707-2652-4.
- O'Toole, Fintan (2013). A History of Ireland in 100 Objects. Dublin: Royal Irish Academy. ISBN 978-1-9089-9615-2.
- Moss, Rachel (2014). Medieval c. 400—c. 1600. London: Yale University Press. ISBN 978-0-3001-7919-4.
- Murray, Griffin (2014). "The Breach Maodhóg: a Unique Medieval Irish Reliquary". Cavan: History and Society. 22 (3–4).
- Murray, Griffin (2005). "A Note on the Provenance of the Breac Maodhóg". The Journal of the Royal Society of Antiquaries of Ireland. 135. JSTOR 25549932.
- Stalley, Roger. "Irish Art in the Romanesque and Gothic Periods". In: Treasures of early Irish art, 1500 B.C. to 1500 A.D: From the collections of the National Museum of Ireland, Royal Irish Academy, Trinity College Dublin Archived 6 June 2021 at the Wayback Machine. New York: Metropolitan Museum of Art, 1977. ISBN 0-8709-9164-7
- Stokes, Margaret (1871). "On Two Works of Ancient Irish Art, known as The Breac Moedog, or Shrine of St Moedog, and the Soiscel Molaise, or Gospel of St. Molaise". "Archaeologia" - Society of Antiquaries of London. 43. J.B. Nichols and Sons: 131–150.
- Wallace, Patrick. "Viking Age Ireland, AD 850–1150". In Ó'Floinn, Raghnal; Wallace, Patrick (eds). Treasures of the National Museum of Ireland: Irish Antiquities. National Museum of Ireland, 2002. ISBN 1-7828-0518-4
