= William Stokes (physician) =

Irish physician

William Stokes MRIA FRS
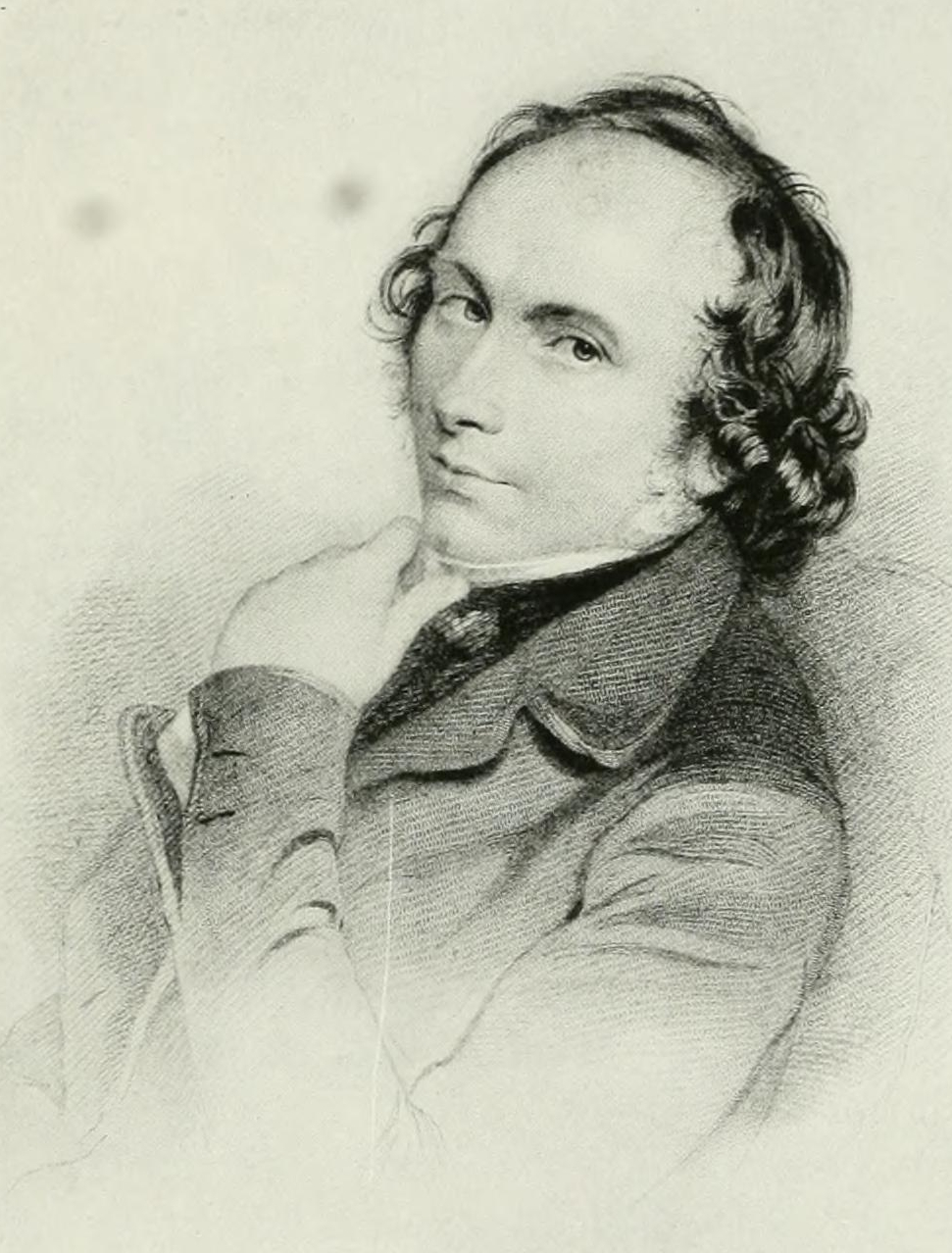
- Born: 1 October 1804; Dublin, Ireland
- Died: 10 January 1878 (aged 73); Howth, Ireland
- Citizenship: British
- Education: University of Edinburgh (MD)
- Known for: Cheyne–Stokes respiration Stokes–Adams syndrome
- Awards: Fellow of the Royal Society (FRS); Fellow of the Royal Irish Academy (MRIA); Pour le Mérite (1876)
- Scientific career
- Fields: Medicine, Physics
- Workplaces: Trinity College Dublin

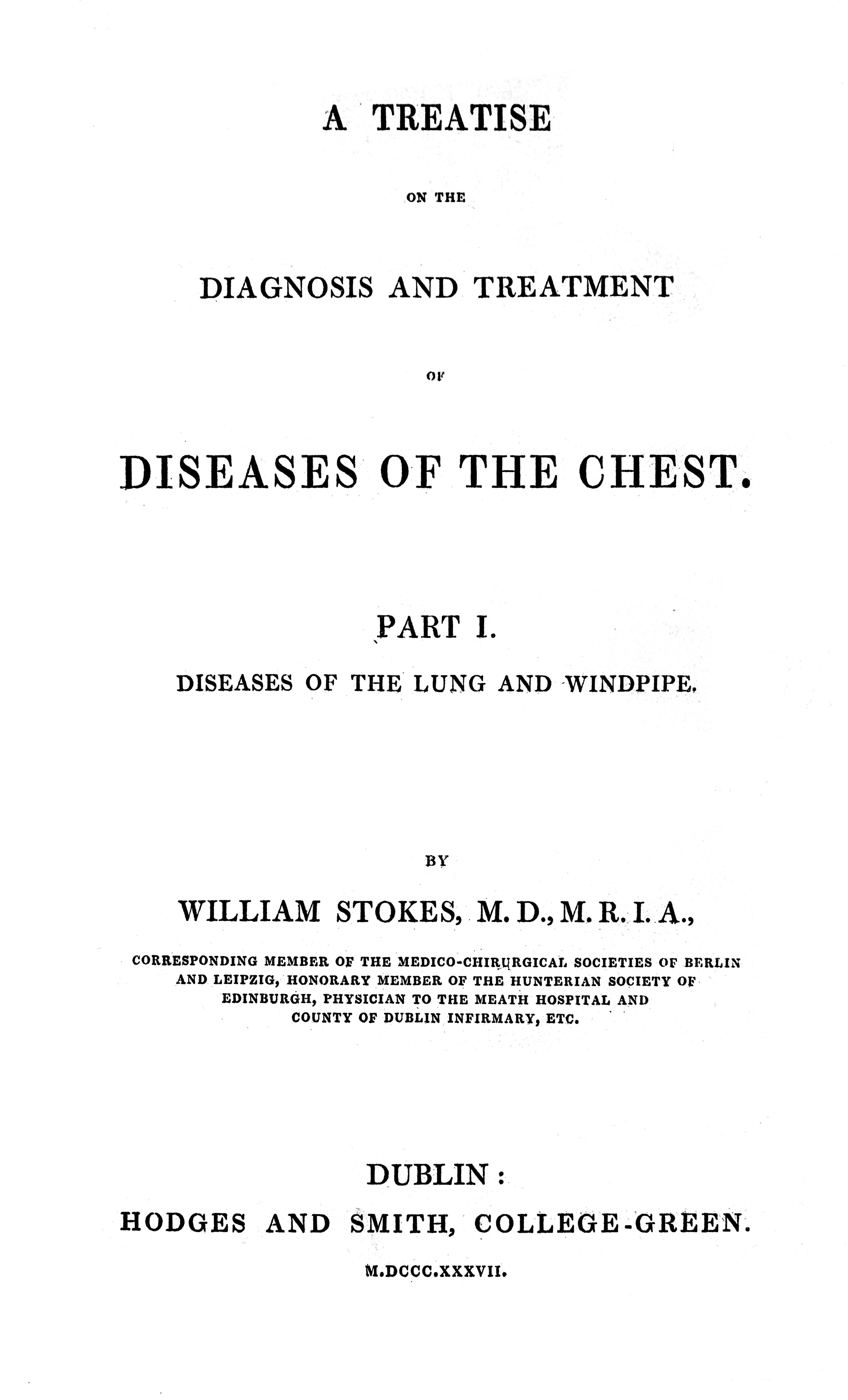
A Treatise on the Diagnosis and Treatment of Diseases of the Chest

William Stokes FRS MRIA (1 October 1804 – 10 January 1878) was an Irish physician and Regius Professor of Physic at Trinity College Dublin. He graduated from the University of Edinburgh Medical School with an MD in 1825, later returning to practice in Dublin at Meath Hospital. He went on to create two important works on cardiac and pulmonary diseases – A Treatise on the Diagnosis and Treatment of Diseases of the Chest (1837) and The Diseases of the Heart and Aorta (1854) – as well as one of the first treatises on the use of the stethoscope. He emphasised the importance of clinical examination in forming diagnoses, and of ward-based learning for students of medicine.

Both Cheyne–Stokes breathing (the alternation of apnoea with tachypnoea) and Stokes–Adams syndrome are named after him. Stokes' sign is a severe throbbing in the abdomen, at the right of the umbilicus, in acute enteritis. Stokes law is that a muscle situated above an inflamed membrane is often affected with paralysis.

In 1858 he was elected a foreign member of the Royal Swedish Academy of Sciences. In June 1861 he was elected a Fellow of the Royal Society as: "The Author of A work on the Diseases of the Lungs, and of a work on the Diseases of the Heart and Aorta – and of other contributions to Pathological Science. Eminent as a Physician". He was elected President of the Royal Irish Academy for 1874–76. In the year 1876, Stokes was also awarded the Pour le Mérite for his medical writings and publications.

His son Sir William Stokes published a biography of William Stokes in 1898. Another son, Whitley Stokes, was a notable lawyer and Celtic scholar, his daughter Margaret Stokes an archaeologist and writer and his father Whitley (senior) also a noted physician.

== Other reading ==
- Doyle, D (December 2006). "Eponymous doctors associated with Edinburgh, Part 2 – David Bruce, John Cheyne, William Stokes, Alexander Monro Secundus, Joseph Gamgee". Journal of the Royal College of Physicians of Edinburgh. 36 (4): 374–81. doi:10.1177/1478271520063604006. PMID 17526135.
- Berry, D (June 2006). "History of cardiology: Robert Adams, MD, and William Stokes, MD". Circulation. 113 (23): f92. PMID 16773739.
- Ventura, H O; Mehra M R; Young J B (September 2001). "Treatment of heart failure according to William Stokes: the enchanted mercury". Journal of Cardiac Failure. 7 (3): 277–282. doi:10.1054/jcaf.2001.26564. PMID 11561230.
- Coakley, D (1999). "Irish pioneers in medical education: Robert Graves (1796–1853) and William Stokes (1804–1877)". European Journal of Dental Education. 3 (Suppl 1): 14–8. PMID 10865357.
- Cantwell, J D (December 1988). "William Stokes (1804–1878)". Clinical Cardiology. 11 (12): 856–8. doi:10.1002/clc.4960111213. PMID 3069261. S2CID 37077334.
- Pinkerton, J H (April 1980). "John Creery Ferguson. Friend of William Stokes and pioneer of auscultation of the fetal heart in the British Isles". British Journal of Obstetrics and Gynaecology. 87 (4): 257–60. doi:10.1111/j.1471-0528.1980.tb04536.x. PMID 7000165. S2CID 70880696.
- Logan, P (December 1978). "William Stokes. View of a student". Irish Medical Journal. 71 (18): 602–4. PMID 363641.
- O'Brien, B (December 1978). "William Stokes (1804–1878)". Irish Medical Journal. 71 (18): 598–601. PMID 363640.
- O'Brien, E (September 1978). "William Stokes 1804–78: the development of a doctor". British Medical Journal. 2 (6139): 749–50. doi:10.1136/bmj.2.6139.749. PMC 1607570. PMID 359096.
- Schoenberg, D G; Schoenberg B S (August 1978). "Eponym: William Stokes: stoking the fires of prevention and pathophysiologic patterns". Southern Medical Journal. 71 (8): 956–7. doi:10.1097/00007611-197808000-00022. PMID 356272.
- Brian, V A (March 1977). "The man behind the name: William Stokes 1804–1878". Nursing Times. 73 (9): 311. PMID 322100.
- Burchell, H B (March 1970). "The early use of the stethoscope in Scotland: William Stokes' contributions as a medical student". Biomedical Library Bulletin. 13: 2–4. PMID 11616688.
- "Men And Medicine (William Stokes)". Medical Science. 14: 77. August 1963. PMID 14061440.
- Fralick, F B (1957). "William Herman Stokes". Transactions of the American Ophthalmological Society. 55: 5. PMC 1312659. PMID 13556806.
