= Irish Medical Organisation =

Registered trade union and professional association for doctors in Ireland

IMO
- Irish Medical Organisation
- Ceardchumann Dhochtúirí na hÉireann
- Predecessor: Irish Medical Association; The Medical Union
- Headquarters: 10 Fitzwilliam Place, Dublin 2
- Location: Ireland
- Publication: Irish Medical Journal
- Affiliations: ICTU, UEMS, CPME

The Irish Medical Organisation (Irish: Ceardchumann Dhochtúirí na hÉireann ) is a professional association for doctors in Ireland, and is also a trade union representing doctors in negotiations with the Irish government.

The IMO was formed in January 1984 through the amalgamation of the Irish Medical Association and the Medical Union. It is a negotiating body which represents doctors in Ireland, recognised for negotiating purposes under the Trade Union Act 1941.

== History ==
=== 1839 – The Irish Medical Association ===
On 29 May 1839, a union of physicians and surgeons was formed at the Royal College of Surgeons in Dublin.

"That it is therefore our opinion a legislative measure should be sought for by us, to unite the medical profession of Ireland into a co-operation upon such principles as shall constitute them one National Faculty, and thereby identify in feelings and interests, the greater mass of provincial practitioners with their metropolitan brethren"

The group lapsed from 1846 to 1852. On 7 June 1853, another congress was held in Dublin to re-establish the Association, and in 1882 it became incorporated as the Irish Medical Association. On 1 January 1936, the IMA merged with the Irish branch of the British Medical Association to form the Irish Free State Medical Union. It was later renamed the Medical Association of Éire (IMA & BMA), which became the IMA in 1950.

=== 1962 – The Irish Medical Union ===
In 1957 negotiations between the IMA and the Irish government over employment conditions for doctors broke down with the government announcing that the IMA was not a registered trade union and so could not be recognised as a negotiating partner.

A debate began then within the organisation, between those who wanted to register as a trade union and those who felt that industrial trade union membership was incompatible with being a professional association with clinical/patient responsibilities or what was sometimes previously termed as a "learned profession".

In 1962, the Irish Medical Union was established, initially, as a sub-section of the IMA and then became a break-away group under the presidency of Dr Johnny Cox, a general practitioner and farmer in Delvin, County Westmeath. The medical doctors' trade union was initially housed at the offices of the IMA in Fitzwilliam Place, Dublin 2, and later moved to separate offices in Northumberland Road, [Dublin 4], then Harcourt Street [Dublin 2], and finally, to Drumcondra, Dublin.

Soon after this split the government agreed to engage in direct negotiations with the Irish Medical Association (IMA) without requiring it to formally register as a trade union. Following the creation of the breakaway IMU in 1962 this effectively divided medical doctors' representation in the Republic of Ireland for over two decades weakening their influence on emerging healthcare public policy and the formation of the state's Health Boards structures in 1970.

=== 1984 – The Irish Medical Organisation ===
In January 1984 the IMA and the IMU amalgamated to become the Medical Union, a name which was later changed to the Irish Medical Organisation.

Five years later a group of hospital consultants formed the Irish Hospital Consultants' Association (IHCA) to represent the specific interests of senior medical specialists. It was established in 1989 and maintains that it has 1,800 of Irish medical consultants within its ranks.

Today the Irish Medical Organisation (IMO) is a negotiating body which acts on behalf of doctors in Ireland, recognised for negotiating purposes under the Trade Union Act 1941, though the IHCA also represents consultant grades in official negotiations with the Health Service Executive HSE and the Department of Health.

The role of the IMO is to represent doctors in Ireland and to provide them with all relevant services. It is organised into four 'craft groups': general practitioners; Consultants; ' Non-consultant hospital doctors (NCHDs); and public health & community medicine doctors. It is also committed to the development of caring, efficient and effective health services in Ireland.

== Structure ==
The organisation has the following Departments: Industrial Relations, Policy & International Affairs, Membership, Operations and Communications. The current President Dr Clive Kilgallen, is a Consultant Pathologist in Beaumont hospital Dublin.

== Irish Medical Journal ==
The IMO is the publisher of the Irish Medical Journal.
