= Margaret Stokes =

Irish illustrator, antiquarian and writer (1832–1900)

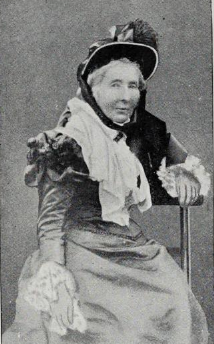
Margaret Stokes

Margaret McNair Stokes (March 1832 – 20 September 1900) was an Irish illustrator, antiquarian and writer.

== Life ==
Born in Dublin, she was the daughter of Dr William Stokes and his wife Mary (née Black). One brother, Whitley Stokes, was a leading Celticist, a second, Sir William, followed their father into medicine and was a leading surgeon. Important figures in the field of antiquities such as artist Sir George Petrie, lawyer and poet Sir Samuel Ferguson, Edwin Wyndham-Quin, 3rd Earl of Dunraven and Mount-Earl, and historians James Henthorn Todd and William Reeves were frequent visitors to the Stokes family home, and this is said to have begun Margaret's interest in Irish antiquities.

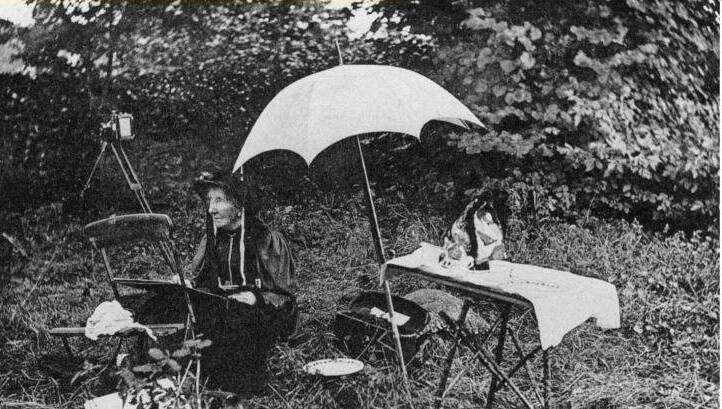
Photograph of Margaret Stokes in old age.

Her first published works were illustrations and illuminations for an 1861 edition of Ferguson's poem The Cromlech at Howth; the title page conflated parts of the illuminations on two pages of the Book of Kells. Margaret was an informed and experienced editor, photographer and illustrator by the time she came to publish research under her own name. In the 1870s she edited Dunraven's Notes on Irish Architecture (3 volumes, 1875–1877) after the author's death in 1871. Her Early Christian Art In Ireland (1887, 2nd edition 1911) was well regarded, and if reviewer Oscar Wilde was unmoved by Stokes' prose, he praised her illustrations. In 1891, Stokes also edited and published the second volume of Adolphe Napoléon Didron's Iconographie chrétienne, which had remained unfinished following his death. Stokes edited this volume from Didron's existing notes and wood engravings prepared for an eventual publication of a "Iconography of Angels and Devils" and additionally introduced original text, marked by square brackets in contrast to a capital "D" used to mark Didron's translated original, for illustrations that Didron had created engravings for but not yet described. She produced two works on early medieval Irish saints in Europe, Six Months in the Apennines (1892) and Three Months in The Forest of France (1895). Her High Crosses of Ireland was incomplete at her death.

She was the first Irish woman to be elected an honorary member of the Royal Irish Academy in 1876 and of the Royal Society of Antiquaries of Ireland.

== Death ==
She died at her home in Howth, County Dublin in 1900. Her papers are held at Trinity College Dublin, and the National Gallery of Ireland holds a chalk portrait by Walter Osborne.

== Sources ==
- Falkiner, Cæsar Litton (1901). "Stokes, Margaret M'Nair" . Dictionary of National Biography (1st supplement). Vol. 3. pp. 362–363.
- Hawkes, Jane (2019). "Margaret Stokes and the visual translation of early medieval monuments". Peritia. 30: 145–175. doi:10.1484/J.PERIT.5.120984. S2CID 239286398.
