= House-shaped shrine =

Type of portable reliquary in the shape of a house

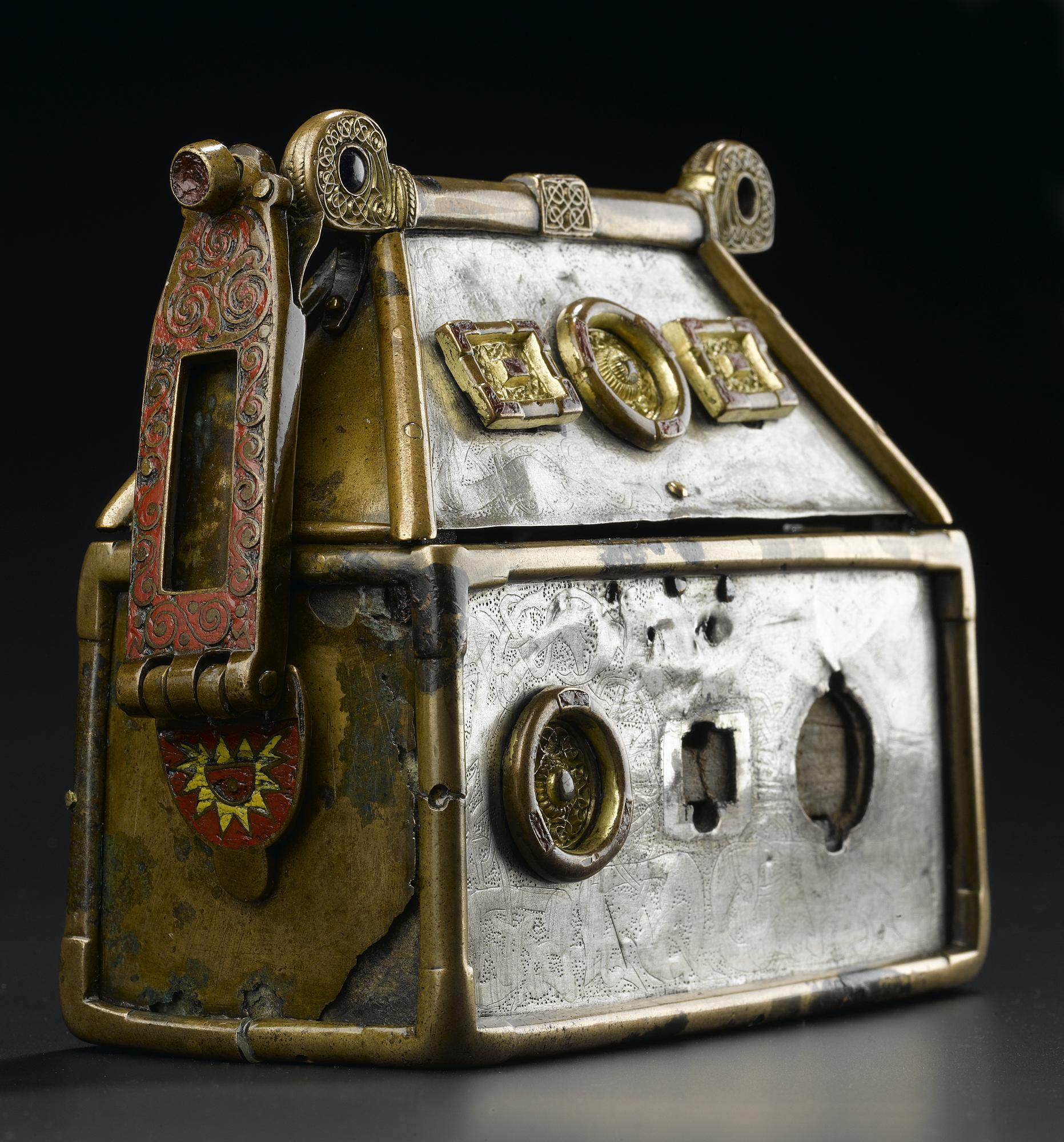
The Monymusk Reliquary, early 8th century, National Museum of Scotland

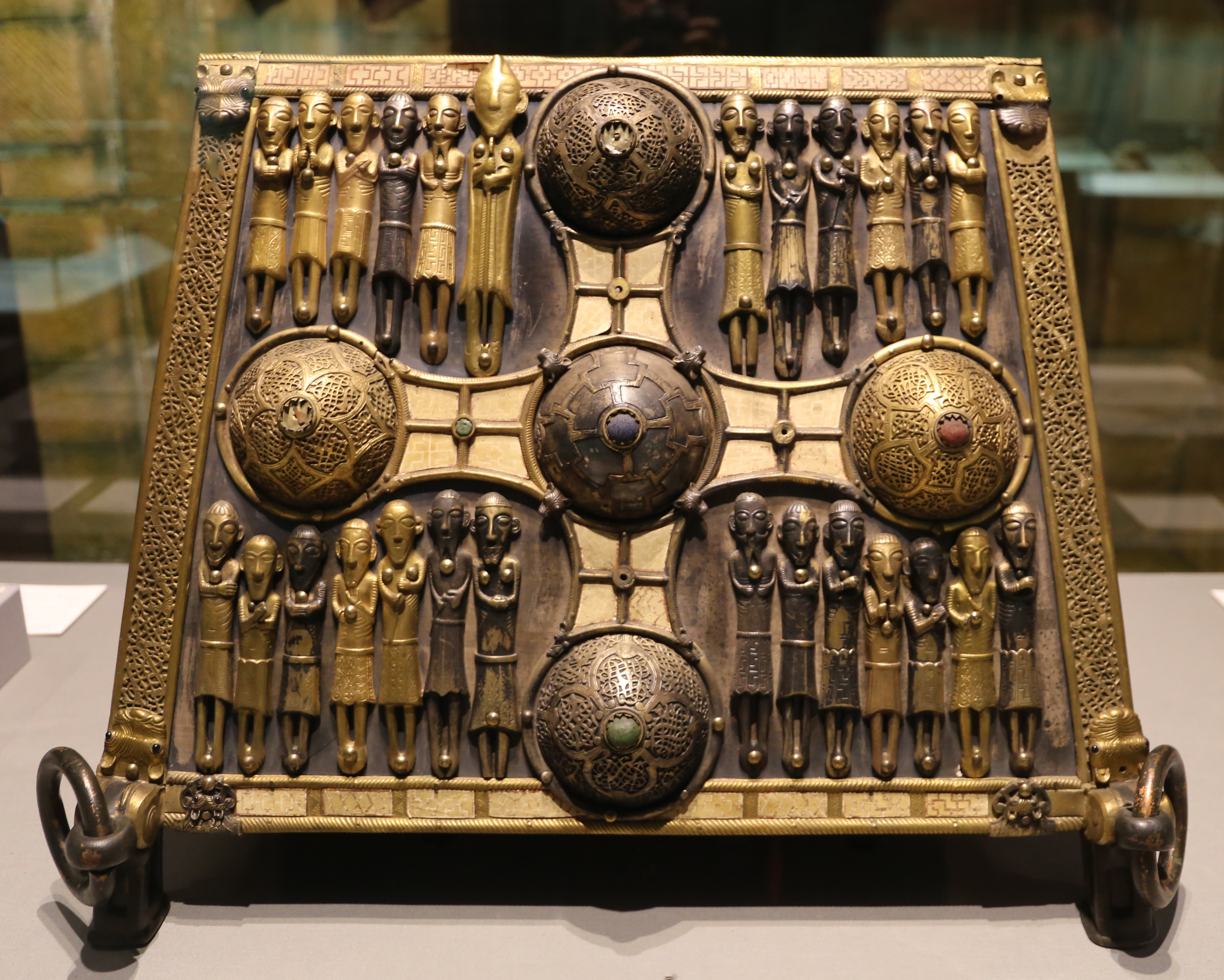
Saint Manchan's Shrine, 12th-century

House-shaped shrine (or church or tomb-shaped shrines) are early medieval portable metal reliquaries formed in the shape of the roof of a rectangular building. They originate from both Ireland and Scotland and mostly date from the 8th or 9th centuries. Typical example consist of a wooden core covered with silver and copper alloy plates, and were built to hold relics of saints or martyrs from the early Church era; a number held corporeal remains when found in the modern period, presumably they were parts of the saint's body. Others, including the Breac Maodhóg, held manuscripts associated with the commemorated saint. Like many Insular shrines, they were heavily reworked and embellished in the centuries following their initial construction, often with metal adornments or figures influenced by Romanesque sculpture.

Similar forms, probably intended to evoke a church or tomb, became very common across Latin Europe for reliquaries in the Late Middle Ages, often decorated with champlevé enamel. These are usually called by the French term chasse.

The format appears to have originated in Ireland, and was adapted in Scotland and Anglo-Saxon England, particularly Northumbria which had close artistic ties with Ireland. The format draws from Ancient Roman and contemporary continental influences, including for later examples, French Romanesque architecture. The type spread to Scandinavia during the 10th and 11th centuries during cultural exchanges following the —disastrous for Ireland— Viking invasion of Ireland. According to Fintan O'Toole "there [was not a] single moment of conversion, and there was probably a considerable overlap between those [vikings] who had gone native and those who kept to the old religion. Conversion, as the historian Donnchadh Ó Corráin put it, "must have come gradually, as an effect of assimilation."

Surviving Irish examples include the Emly shrine (found in County Limerick, dated to the late 7th–early 8th century, often considered the exemplary of the series), the Lough Erne Shrines (9th century), Bologna Shrine (9th century), the Breac Maodhóg (11th century) and Saint Manchan's Shrine (12th century). Three fully intact examples have been found in Norway (the 'Copenhagen' or 'Ranvaik's Casket'), Melhus and Setnes shrines), one is in Scotland (the Monymusk Reliquary), one is in Wales (the shrine of St. Gwenfrewi at Gwytherin), and two are in Italy.

== Function ==
The earliest examples date from the late 7th century when the practice of the disinterment of the bodies of saints to recover relics for worship (or their supposed healing powers) first became popular in Ireland, although the cult of relics had become widespread on the European continent from the 4th century. Most were at first placed in plain wooden reliquary, that were lavishly decorated and embellished over the following centuries.

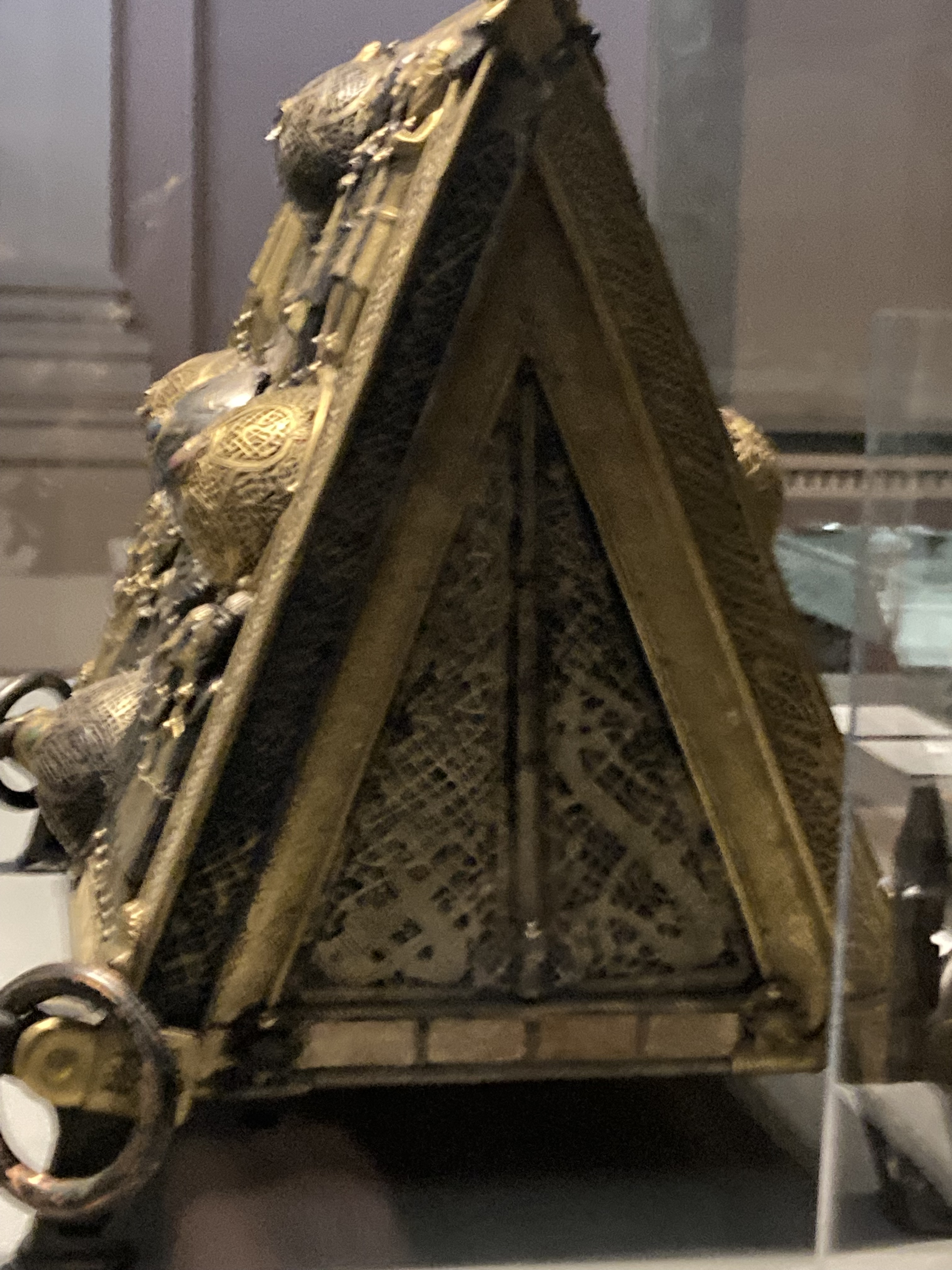
Side view of Saint Manchan's Shrine, 12th century

As well as relics, some Irish shrines were intended as receptacles for manuscripts, or perhaps as containers for the Eucharist. It is thought that most ironwork reliquaries were commissioned in part as status symbols, and primarily to be housed in their home monastery or church, perhaps in front of the altar. House-shaped shrine were built to be portable, and were often moved from their fixed church positions for local processions, to collect church dues, for oath swearing or other diplomatic occasions, or less frequently as battle standards to protected the home troops and ask God for victory. For this reason, the majority contain carrying hinges to which leather straps could be attached to be carried over the shoulder or around the neck. The straps for the larger Lough Erne shrines, found in 1891 by fishermen, is secured by separate cast escutcheons. The inner core of most have lids used to access or display their relic. Irish annals from the 8th and 9th centuries record shrines —later described as "reliquiae" or "martires" (martyres)— containing the corporeal remains of saints being carried from town to town by clerics.

Saint Manchan's shrine was built to hold human remains, while the Tuscan Abbadia San Salvatore shrine, sealed in the 12th century, contained bones that were probably primary. A number of Scandinavian examples also contained bones, but many are considered to have been secondary (i.e. added after the shrine was first constructed). All but the example at Abbadia San Salvatore are now empty.

The now badly damaged Breac Maodhóg was probably used as a battle standard, when it would have been carried onto the battlefield by a cleric so as to offer protection to the troops and perhaps bring victory. A medieval text on the life of the patron saint of the kings of Leinster, St Maedoc of Ferns, records that the kings of Breifne sought that "the famous wonder-working Breac [was] carried thrice around them" during battle.

The enshrinement of corporeal relics became less common during the 12th century. This was due to the volume of remaining available relics to already "in use", but in part also due to the development of devotional images, although some of these still contained cavities for holding relics.

== Format ==
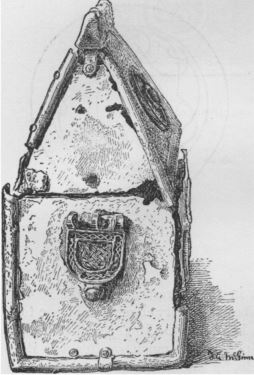
19th c drawing of one of the gabled sides of the larger Lough Erne Shrine

House-shaped reliquaries are constructed to resemble the roofs of early Christian churches. or those of a form similar to the intact 12th century Gallarus Oratory in County Kerry, Ireland, A number of scholars have suggested that the shapes were inspired by early tomb-art (specifically Roman and early medieval sarcophagus), rather than churches, also seen in their similarity to the caps-stones of some Insular high crosses. Some Scandinavian examples are lined with runic inscriptions, suggesting pagan or secular functions. The sides of an example found in a grave for a woman at Sunndal Municipality, Norway, are decorated with opposing pairs of birds heads.

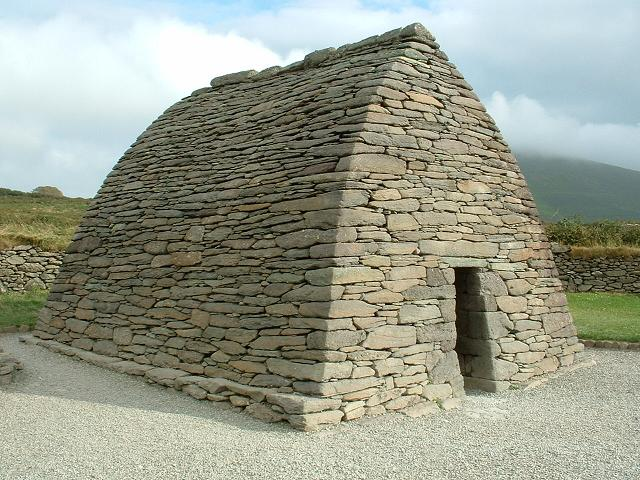
The 6th century Gallarus Oratory chapel gives an indication of the type of church buildings from which house-shaped shrines took their form.

The shrines are typically built from a wooden core (usually from yew wood) lined with metal plates of bronze or silver. The two long sides are typically decorated with relief metal work, while the narrow sides have pairs of decorative bosses. The high-pitched, usually sloped "roof"s are held together by ridge-poles and hinged lids secured by a sliding pin which when opened give access to the wooden core and its relic. Of the 8–9th century examples, only the Lough Erne Shrine has straight rather than sloped sides. A number of art historians, including Rachel Moss of Trinity College Dublin, classify them into three broad types: those with a wooden core encased by metal plates, those consisting of wooden boxes decorated with metal ornaments, and fully metal shrines. They typically have cross on the main face, surrounded by large rock crystal gems or other semi-precious stones, while the spaces between the arms of the cross contain more varied decorations, they show imagery associated with their saint. The gems are always light coloured; their transparency was intended to give the viewer the impression that they could "look-through" to the relic in the interior. The sides of most examples are decorated with interlace, and many contain animal ornamentation.

They are larger than the similar, but a few centuries later, book-shaped shrines (cumdachs) and are mostly larger than the relics they were built to contain. The Lough Erne shrine is 16 cm high, 17.7 cm wide and has a depth of 7.8 cm, making it the largest known Irish reliquary casket.

A modified version of the shape, more usually called a chasse, remained popular for reliquaries in mainland Europe until the Late Middle Ages; a well known example is the Shrine of the Three Kings in Cologne Cathedral. These were probably intended to represent, or at least evoke, coffins or mausolea rather than houses or churches, and the ends are most often vertical rather than sloping.

== Surviving examples ==
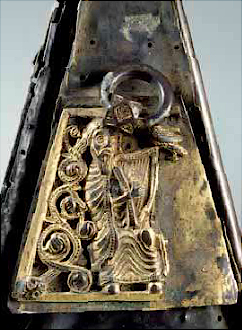
Side view of the Breac Maodhóg, one of the smallest surviving shrines of this type. 11th century, National Museum of Ireland

The shrines were built during the so-called "golden-age" of both Irish metalwork and, more broadly, Insular art. A small number bear autograph inscriptions by the craftsmen, but apart from these etchings, little else is known about the individual artisans. However we do know that skilled metal workers were highly regarded and had high social status in medieval Ireland. As they were in high demand, they were probably itinerant, in a highly stratified society that only allowed a select few move between its petty kingdoms, in an era when Ireland was ruled by some 150 "Túath" (people in English, meaning fiefdom in context). Contemporary Irish metalworkers had close ties with craftsmen in Scotland, including the Pictish monastery at Portmahomack, and monasteries in Northumbria; exchanges of styles and influences are evident in the examples from these areas, at a time when artisans across the British Isles where both exposed to multiple classical and complex mainland European influences.

There are some thirty-five surviving medieval European examples, in various conditions, of which nine are Insular. The majority are hip-roofed, with some gable-ended. The best known Insular examples include Saint Manchan's Shrine, Ireland's largest surviving reliquary, the early 8th century Scottish Monymusk Reliquary, the 8th or 9th century Lough Kinale Book Shrine, and the 9th century Irish Breac Maodhóg. Although a great many more where likely produced, most lost during Viking raids, 12th century Norman wars, later internal battles, or were dismantled and smelted so the bronze and sliver could be sold off.

In addition, there are dozens of surviving fragments, including a portion of what is thought to have been an important 9th house-shrine found in a drain near Clonard, County Meath in the late 19th century.

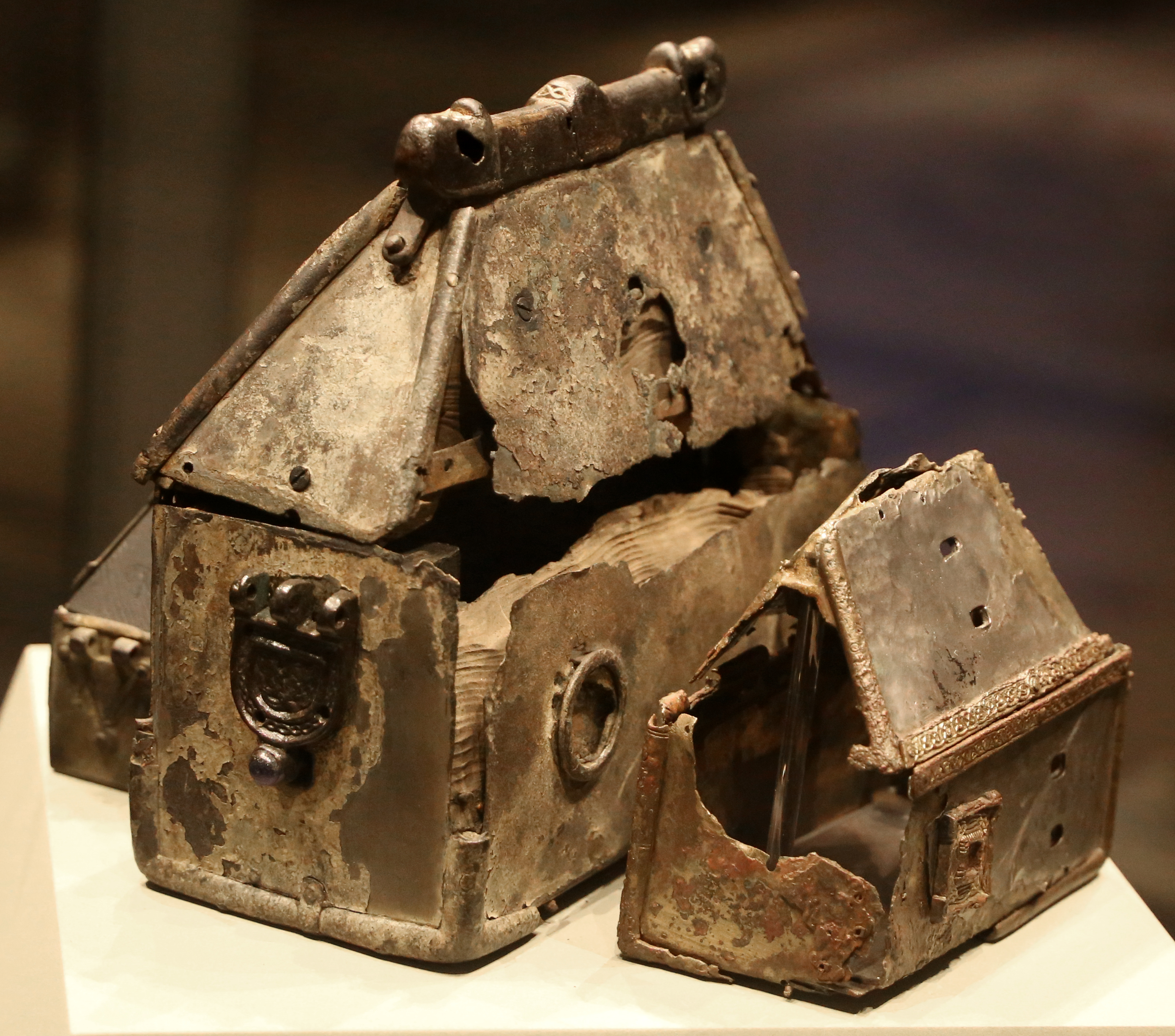
The Lough Erne Shrines, 9th century, NMI. The much smaller but similar shrine was found inside the larger container.

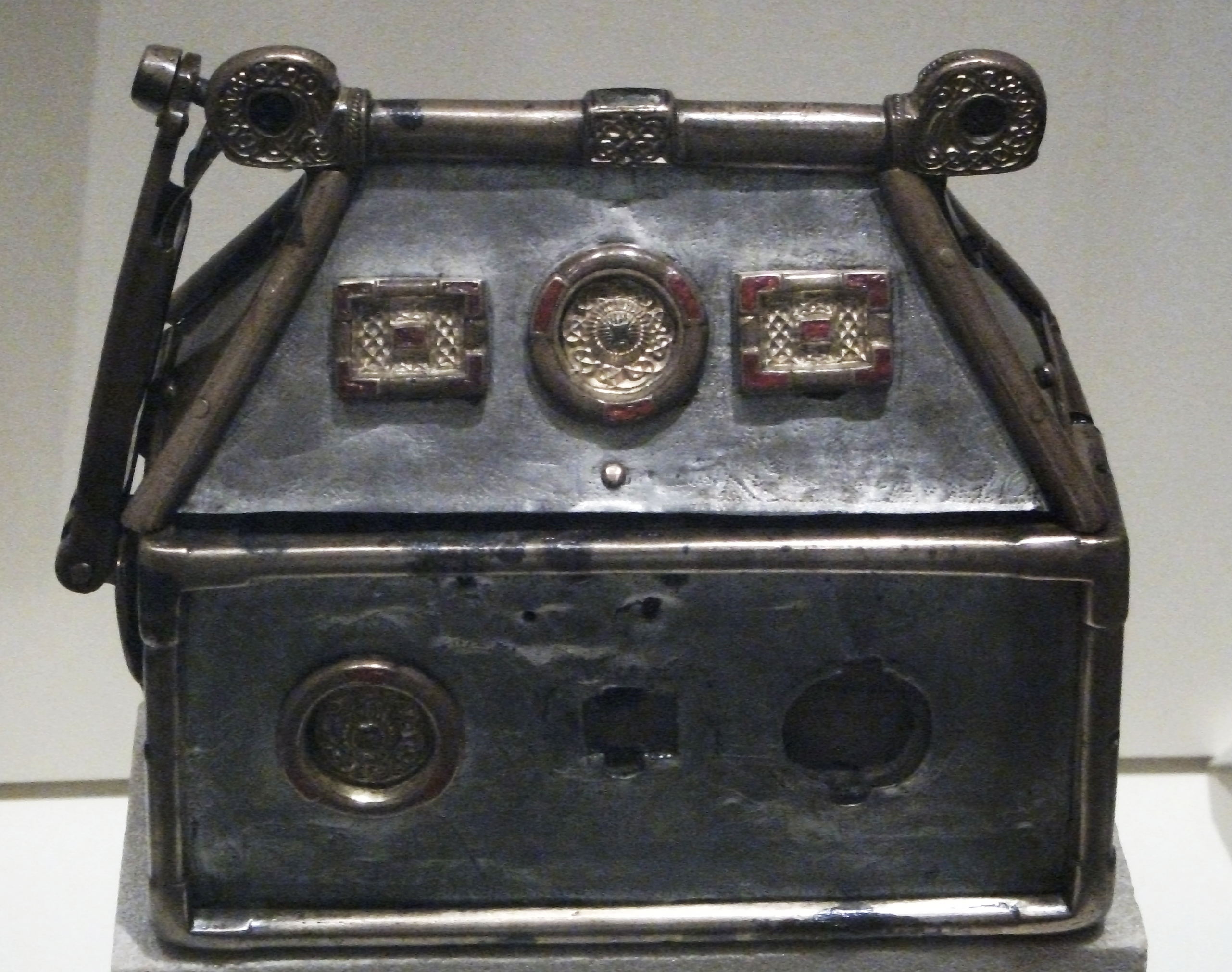
Monymusk Reliquary, 8th century, National Museum of Scotland

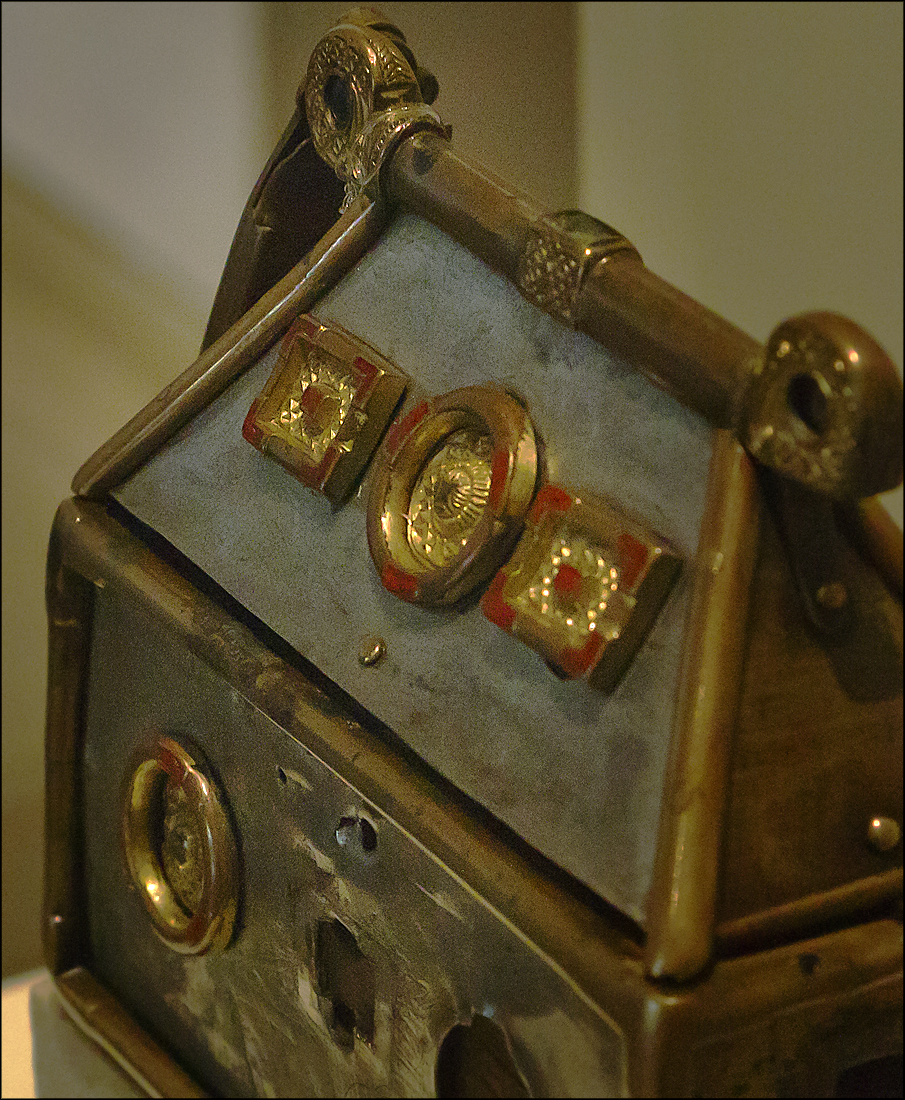
Ornamentation on the Monymusk Reliquary

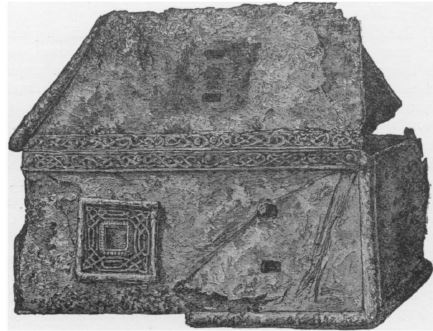
Drawing of the shrine found in the River Shannon

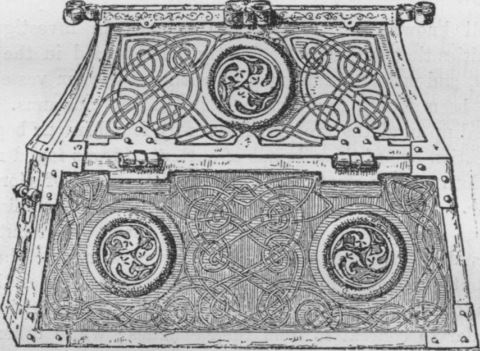
Drawing of a long side view of the Copenhagen shrine, with large interlace designs

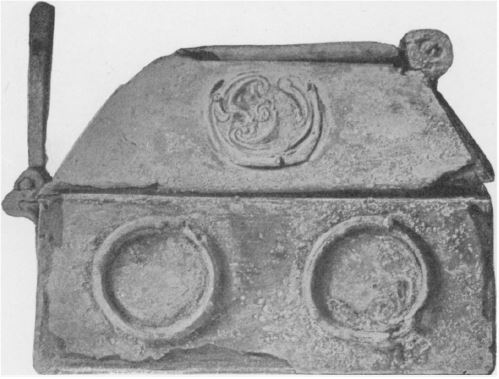
Reliquary shrine found in a Viking grave in Melhus Municipality, Norway
