= Lough Erne Shrines =

Medieval Irish reliquary

The Lough Erne Shrines
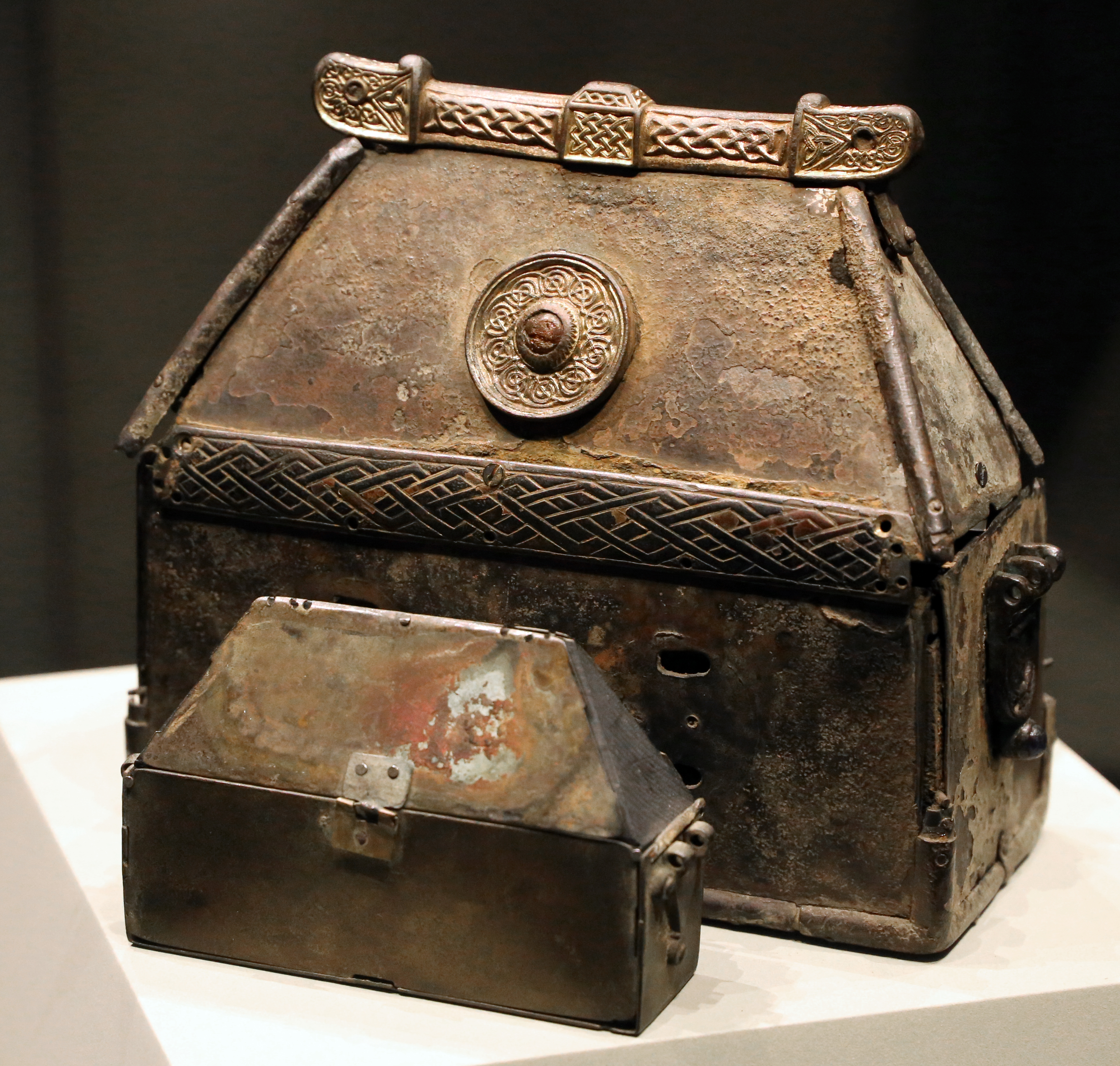
- Material: wood, tinned bronze
- Size: Larger shrine: height 16 cm (6.3 in), width 17.7 cm (7.0 in), 7.8 cm (3.1 in); Smaller shrine: height 6.8 cm (2.7 in), width 10.6 cm (4.2 in), 3.2 cm (1.3 in)
- Created: 8th or 9th-century
- Discovered: 1891; Lough Erne, County Fermanagh, Ireland
- Present location: National Museum of Ireland, Kildare Street, Dublin

The Lough Erne Shrines are two small 8th or 9th-century reliquaries produced in the House-shaped shrine format. They were discovered in 1891 by fishermen on Lower Lough Erne near the townland of Tully in County Fermanagh, Ireland. It is assumed that the shrines are roughly contemporaneous but were produced separately. The plain, smaller shrine is just over a third of the size of the larger, decorated reliquary.

The shrines were in poor condition on discovery and were restored shortly after. They were in the possession of the Royal Irish Academy soon after their find, and shortly thereafter transferred to the then newly formed National Museum of Ireland on Kildare Street, where they are on permanent display.

== Description ==
The shrines are very similar in shape, and both are in the House-shaped shrine format with a hipped "roof" and gabled ends.

=== Smaller shrine ===
The smaller shrine was discovered inside the larger one and is 6.8 cm (2.7 in) high. It consists of a plain bronze box. It is badly damaged, but retains one of its long sides and both gables. Given its simpler design, this shrine is thought to be the older of the two.

=== Larger shrine ===
The larger reliquary is 16 cm (6.3 in) high, making it the largest of the extant house-shaped shrines. It has a core of two carved yew-wood blocks that support the roof and base. The core is overlaid with bronze plates that form an outer shell. The plates are decorated with bronze mountings, bosses and interlace.

The cast ridge consists of a rectangular bar running along the top of the "roof". The ridge is decorated with interlace patterns and has animal-head terminals that show two beasts looking towards each other.

== Discovery and provenance ==
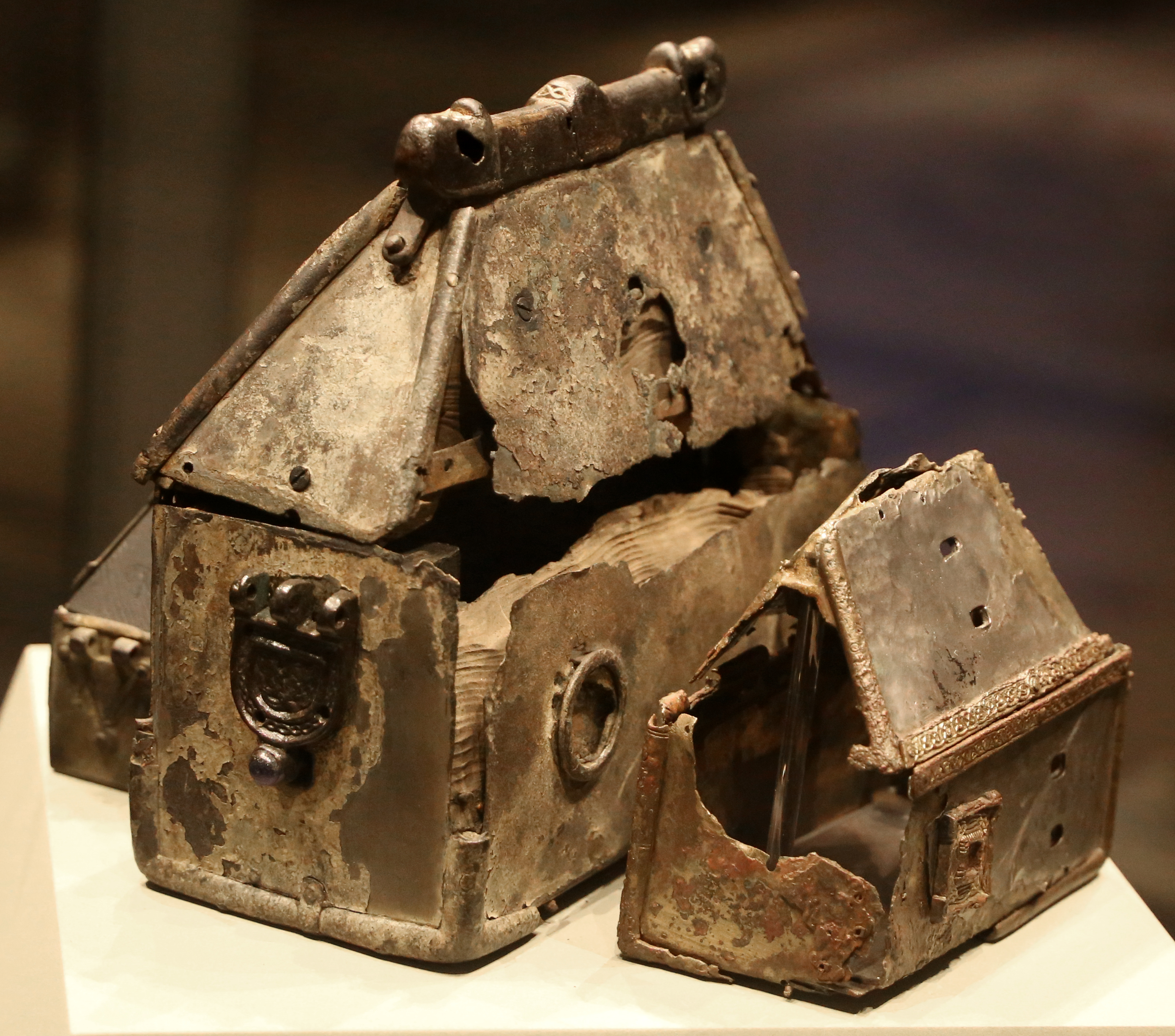
The shrines shown side by side

The Lough Erne Shrines were discovered in the summer of 1891 by fishermen on Lower Lough Erne near the townland of Tully in County Fermanagh, Ireland.

Soon after the find, the antiquarian Denis Murphy wrote that "in the summer of 1891, some fishermen were engaged in plying their trade in the waters of Lower Lough Erne, about midway between Ennis Killen and Belleek. There, on the western side of the lake, is a small bay; close by, on a projecting point, are the remains of a stone structure....possibly this was the site of the religious house to which the shrine, found close by [belonged]. All tradition about it seems to have died out, if indeed it ever existed. One of the fishermen hooked a fish. It went to the bottom of the deep water and remained there for some time, moving about when stirred by the gentle pressure of the hook. Somehow the line got entangled in what the fisherman thought was a stump; and when the fish rose to the surface, what was supposed to be a stump turned out to be the shrine."

When recovered, both had suffered significant water damage during their centuries in the lough, with large areas of their structure lost to corrosion. The remaining parts of both objects have undergone extensive restoration.

== Sources ==
- Crawford, Henry (1923). "A Descriptive List of Irish Shrines and Reliquaries. Part I". The Journal of the Royal Society of Antiquaries of Ireland. 13 (1). JSTOR 25513282.
- Harbison, Peter (1999). The Golden Age of Irish Art: The Medieval Achievement 600-1200. London: Thames & Hudson. ISBN 0-5000-1927-4.
- Lucas, Anthony (1986). "The Social Role of Relics and Reliquaries in Ancient Ireland". The Journal of the Royal Society of Antiquaries of Ireland. 116. JSTOR 25508904.
- Murphy, Denis (1891–93). "On a Shrine Lately Found in Lough Erne, Now Belonging to Thomas Plunkett, Esq, T.C., Ennis-Killen". The Journal of the Royal Society of Antiquaries of Ireland. 2 (4): 290–294. JSTOR 20503893.
- Murphy, Denis (1892). "On the Ornamentation of the Lough Erne Shrine". The Journal of the Royal Society of Antiquaries of Ireland. 2 (4): 349–355. JSTOR 25507937.
- Ryan, Michael. In: Moss, Rachel. Medieval c. 400—c. 1600. "Art and Architecture of Ireland (series)". London: Yale University Press, 2014. ISBN 978-0-3001-7919-4
