= Adolphe Napoléon Didron =

French art historian and archaeologist (1806–1867)

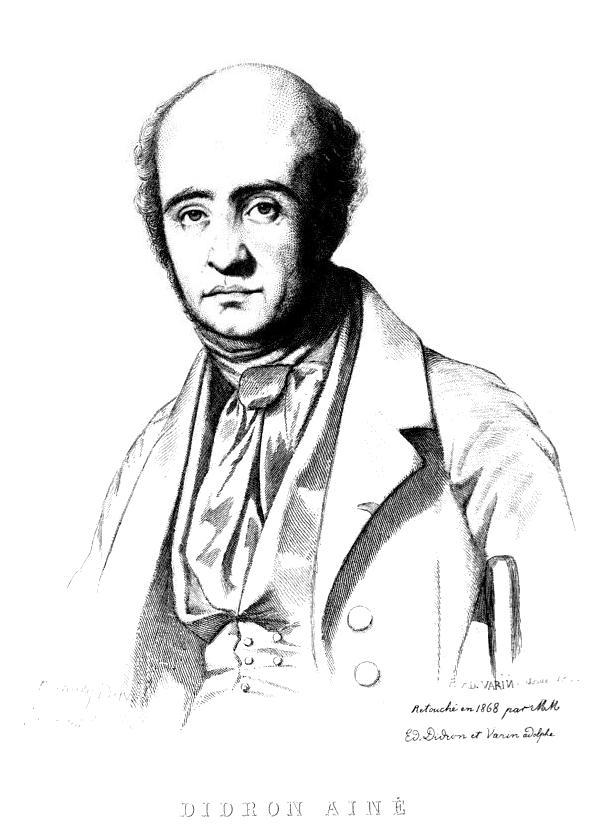
- Born: 13 March 1806; Hautvillers, Marne, France
- Died: 13 November 1867 (aged 61)
- Occupations: Art historian, archeologist
- Relatives: Édouard Didron (nephew)

Adolphe Napoléon Didron (1806–1867) was a French art historian and archaeologist.

== Biography ==
Adolphe Napoléon Didron was born in Hautvillers on 13 March 1806. He began his education as a student of law. He then completed his early studies at the preparatory seminaries of Meaux and Reims.

He became a professor of history in Paris in 1826, and devoted his leisure hours to following courses of law, medicine, etc. In 1830, he began, on the advice of Victor Hugo, a study of the Christian archaeology of the Middle Ages. After visiting and examining the principal churches, first of Normandy, then of central and southern France, he was on his return in 1835 appointed by Guizot secretary to the Historical Committee of Arts and Monuments; and in the following years he delivered several courses of lectures on Christian iconography at the Bibliothèque Royale.

In 1839, he visited Greece for the purpose of examining the art of the Eastern Church, both in its buildings and its manuscripts. In 1844, he originated the Annales archéologiques, a periodical devoted to his favorite subject, which he edited until his death. In 1845 he established at Paris a special archaeological press, and at the same time a stained glass factory. In the same year he was admitted to the Légion d'honneur.

His most important work is the Iconographie chrétienne, of which, however, the first portion only, Histoire de Dieu, was published, in 1843. It was translated into English by E. J. Millington. Among his other works may be mentioned the introduction and comments to Manuel d'iconographie chrétienne grecque et latine (by Dionysios of Fourna, translated by Paul Durand), published in 1845, the Iconographie des chapiteaux du palais ducal de Venise of 1857, and the Manuel des objets de bronze et d'orfèvrerie, published in 1859. A second volume of Iconographie chrétienne, discussing iconography of angels, demons, death, the soul, and salvation, was published posthumously based on Didron's existing notes and wood engravings prepared for an eventual publication of a "Iconography of Angels and Devils". These were edited by Margaret Stokes, who additionally introduced original text, marked by square brackets, for illustrations that Didron had created engravings for but not yet described, and published in English in 1891.

He died on 13 November 1867.
