= Monymusk Reliquary =

Eighth century Scottish house-shape reliquary

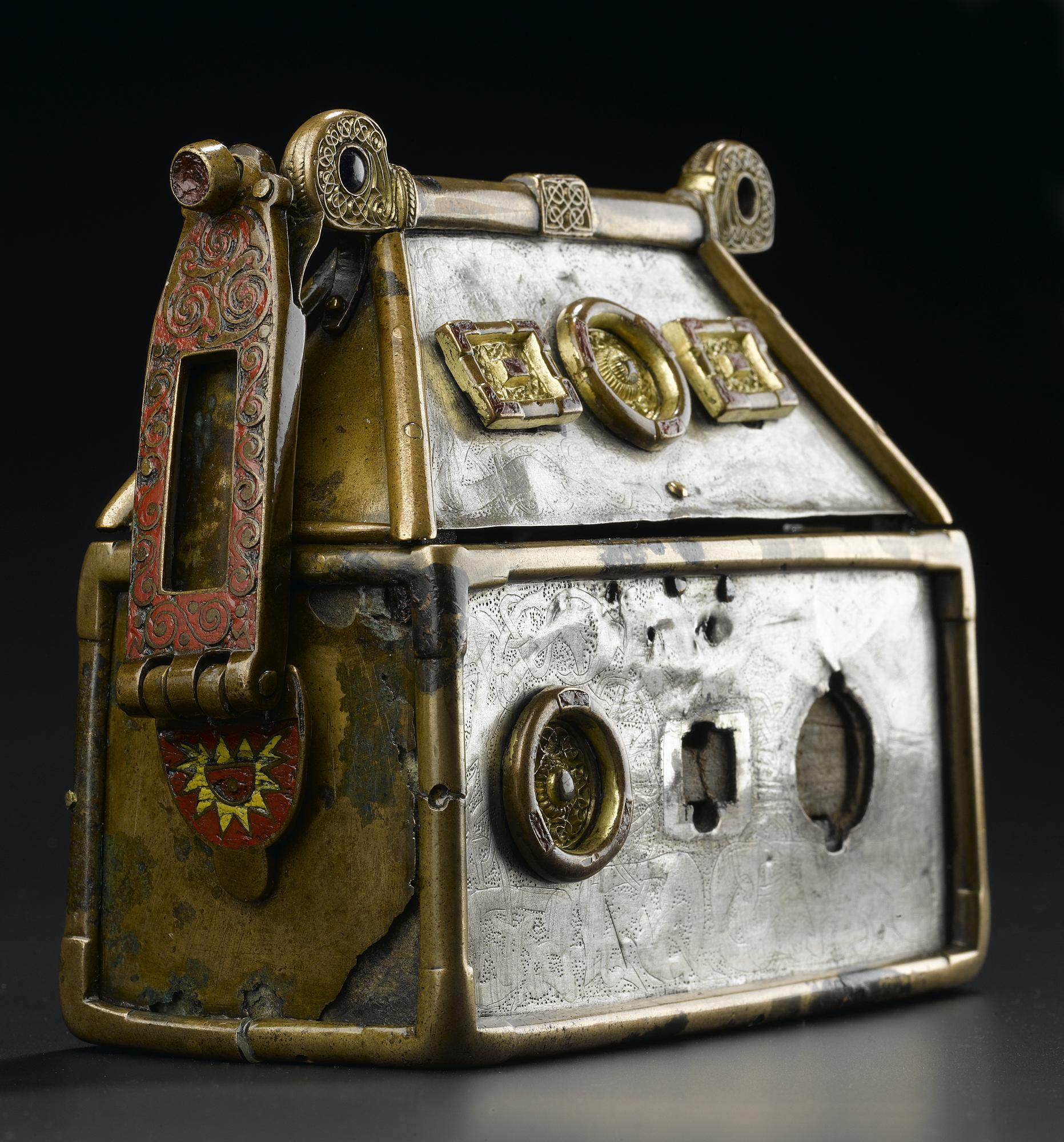
The Monymusk Reliquary, early 8th century, National Museum of Scotland

The Monymusk Reliquary is an eighth century Scottish house-shape reliquary made of wood and metal characterised by an Insular fusion of Gaelic and Pictish design and Anglo-Saxon metalworking, presumably by the Celtic Church monks of Iona Abbey. It is now in the National Museum of Scotland in Edinburgh.

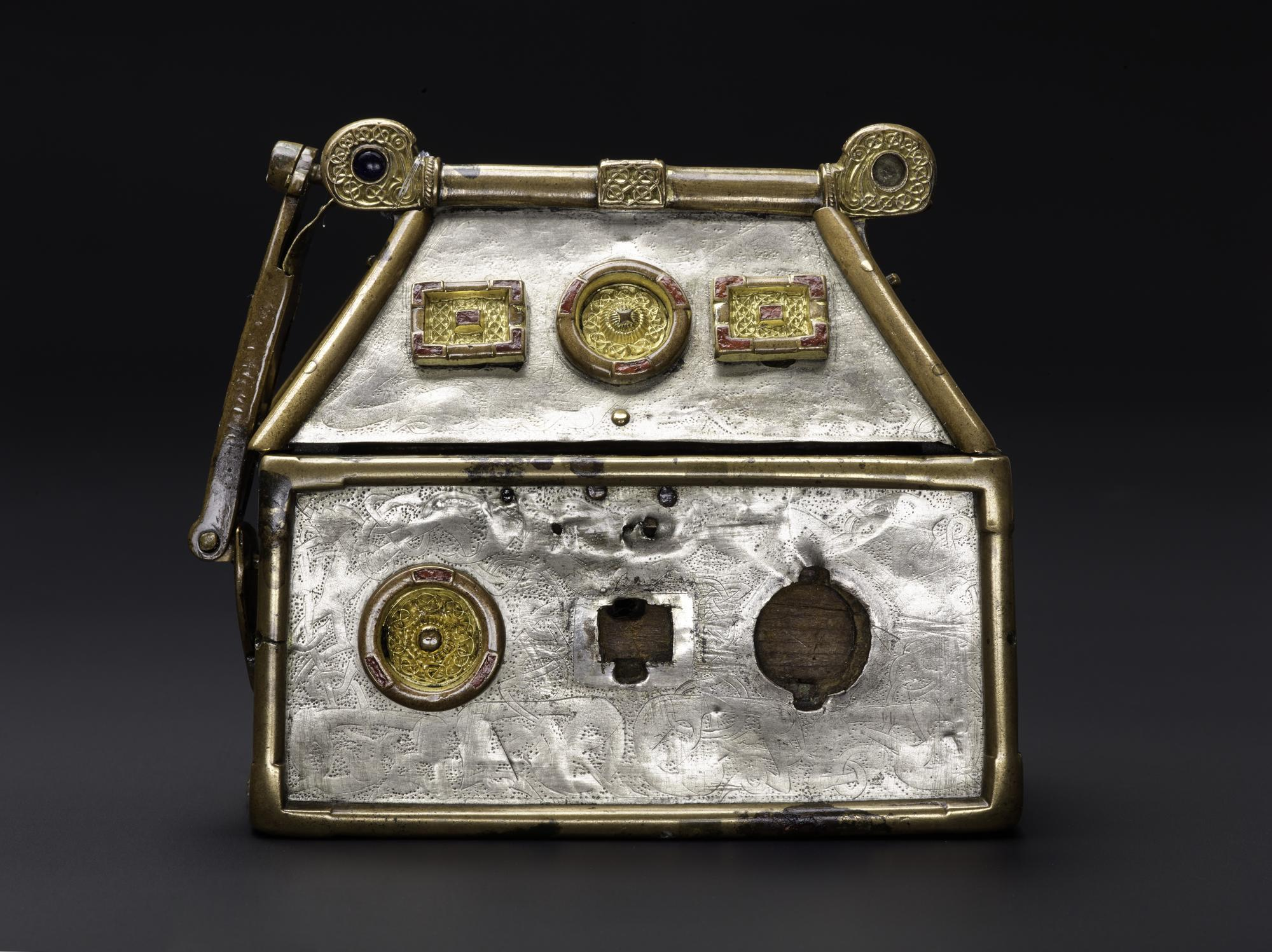
Front view; one of two enamelled hinge plates survive that would have attached a strap so that the reliquary could be carried, possibly around the neck.

It is an early example of the house-shaped shrine that became popular across Europe later in the Middle Ages, perhaps influenced by Insular styles. The Monymusk Reliquary is now empty. Its dimensions are W 112 mm (4.4 in) x D 51 mm (2.0 in) x H 89 mm (3.5 in).

Past scholars suggested that Monymusk Reliquary was the Brecbennach of St. Columba (modern Gaelic Breac Bannoch or "embossed peaked-thing"), a sacred battle ensign of the Scottish army, used for saintly assistance, and mentioned in various charters associated with Arbroath Abbey. However, this identification of the Monymusk Reliquary with the Brecbennach is unlikely, and the Monymusk Reliquary is therefore not the object mentioned in historical records. Very few Insular reliquaries survive, although many are mentioned in contemporary records.

== Style ==
It is characterised by a mixture of Pictish artistic designs and Irish artistic traditions (perhaps first brought to Scotland by Irish missionaries in the sixth century), fused with Anglo-Saxon metalworking techniques, an artistic movement now classified as Insular or Hiberno-Saxon art. The casket is wooden, but is covered with silver and copper-alloy. It was made around 750, probably by Ionan monks. It shows a combination of the Pictish and Insular styles which appear in manuscripts such as the Lindisfarne Gospels (c. 715 AD). The silver plates on the front and lid of the casket are decorated with beasts leaping and twisting, and biting at their tails on a spotted field, characteristic of animal style in Celtic art. The stippled punch marks are characteristically Irish in style.

== The Brecbennoch ==
The Monymusk Reliquary was once believed to have contained relics of St. Columba, the most popular saint in medieval Scotland, since from the 19th century it was believed to be the "Brecbennoch of St. Columba", a sacred battle ensign of the Scottish army, though this is now doubted by scholars. The Brecbennoch may have been handed to the abbot of Arbroath Abbey during the reign of William I (r. 1165 - 1214), who in turn passed it to someone else's care at Forglen. The custodian was charged with the care of the reliquary, so that it could be used for saintly assistance by the Scots in battle. It was carried by the Scottish army who were victorious against the army of King Edward II of England at the Battle of Bannockburn (1314).

== History ==
The Monymusk Reliquary was perhaps at Forglen until the sixteenth century, when both Forglen and Monymusk came into the hands of the Forbes family. In 1712 it was transferred to Sir Francis Grant of Cullen. It stayed in the Grant collection until 1933, when it was due to be auctioned, but was acquired by the National Museum of Scotland first, with the help of the Art Fund. It is arguably one of the most important pieces in the museum's collection.

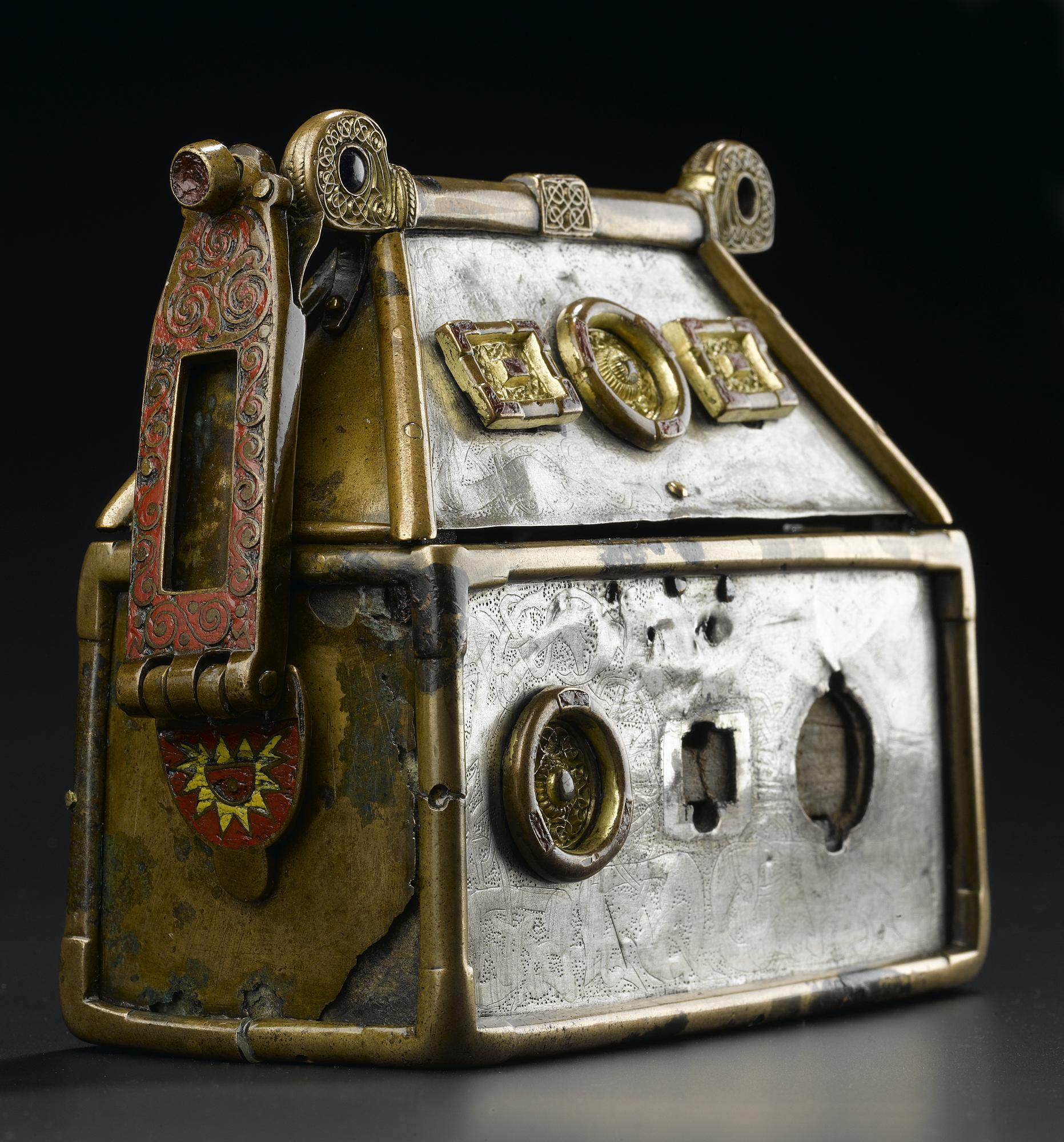
The casket and lid are each carved from a solid piece of wood, and covered in thin bronze and silver plates.

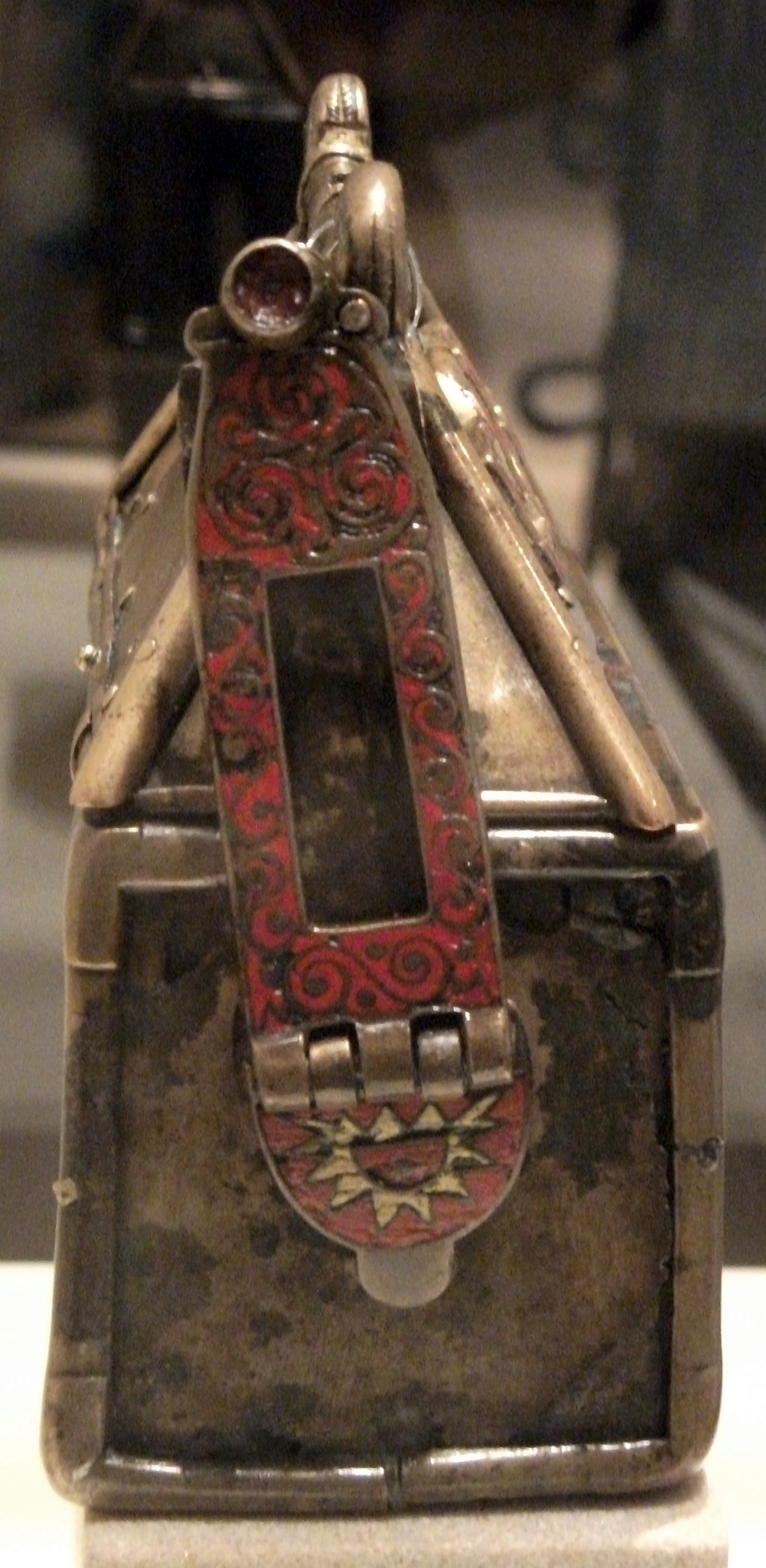
Side view

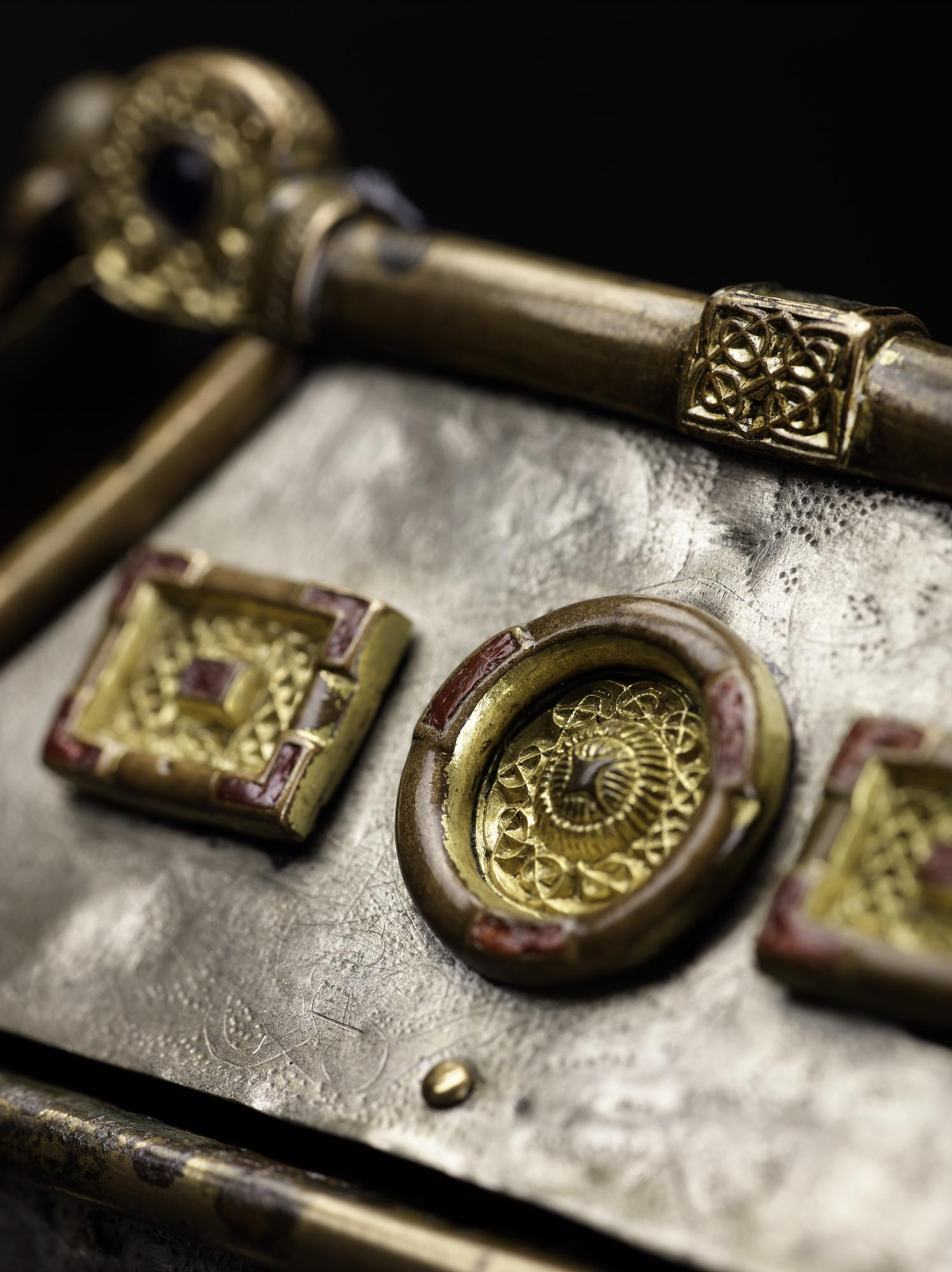
From the style of its ornament, the reliquary is thought to have been made towards the beginning of the 8th century.

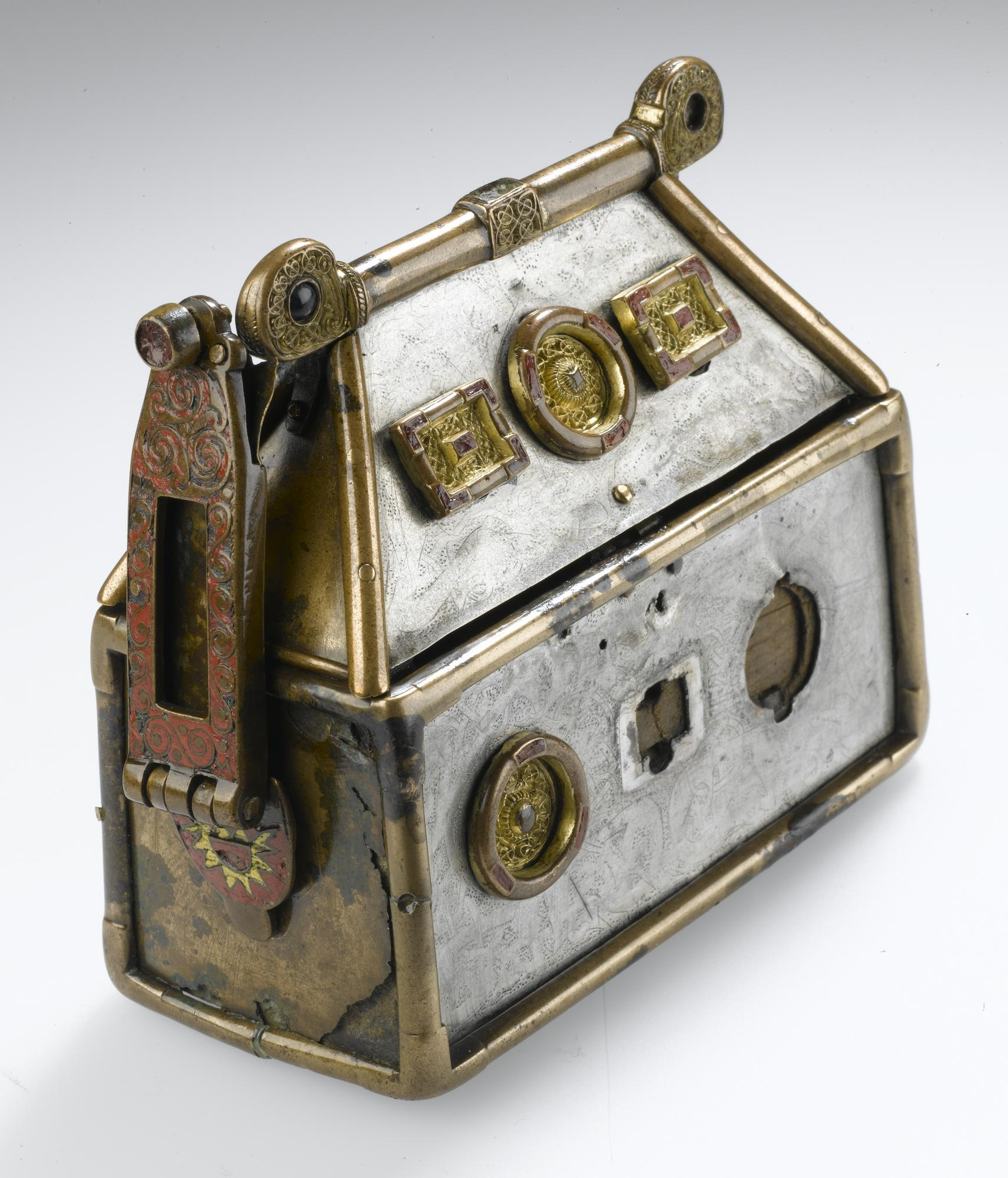
The silver plates are decorated with very faint interlacing animals and with bronze mounts featuring red enamel.

== Bibliography ==
- Moss, Rachel. Medieval c. 400—c. 1600: Art and Architecture of Ireland. Yale University Press, 2014. ISBN 978-03-001-7919-4
- Wormald, Jenny (ed.), Scotland: A History, (Oxford, 2005), Plate 2, opp. p. 42
