= William Stokes (surgeon) =

Irish surgeon

External image
- Gravestone of Sir William Stokes at St George's Garrison Church, Fort Napier, Pietermaritzburg, South Africa

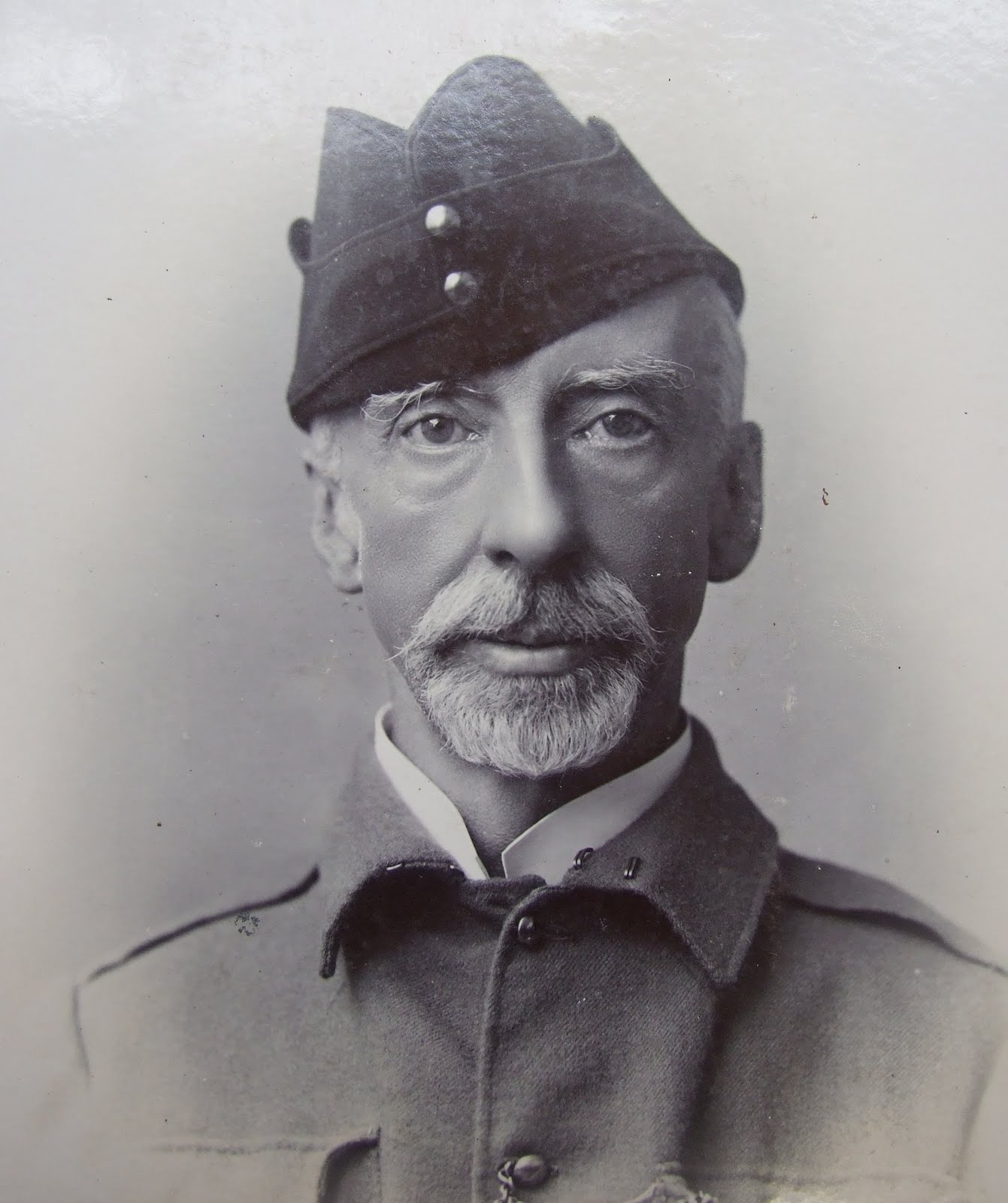

Sir William Stokes (10 March 1838 – 18 August 1900) was an Irish surgeon.

The son of William Stokes, he was born in Dublin, studied medicine there (M.D., 1863) and at Berlin, London, Paris, and Vienna. In 1864 he settled in practice in Clare St., Dublin until 1878 when he moved to his father's house in Merrion Square. In 1864 he was elected surgeon to the Meath Hospital. He resigned from this post in 1868 upon his appointment as surgeon to the House of Industry Hospitals (which included the Richmond Hospital).

In 1871 he became Professor of Surgery at the Royal College of Surgeons in Ireland (RCSI). He served as President of the Royal College of Surgeons in Ireland in 1886–1887 and was knighted in 1886. In 1888 he returned to the Meath Hospital as surgeon and was appointed surgeon in ordinary to Queen Victoria in 1892. He was a governor of the Westmoreland Lock Hospital in Dublin.

In 1900 he went to South Africa as a consulting surgeon to the British forces in the war against the Boers. While there he was attacked with pleurisy, and he died in Pietermaritzburg. He was buried in the military cemetery at Fort Napier, Natal.

In 1869 he married Elizabeth Moore by whom he had one son and two daughters. He wrote, amongst other works, Contributions to Practical Surgery (1865, et seq) and Selected Papers on Operative and Clinical Surgery (1902), edited by William Taylor.
