= Lug (hinge) =

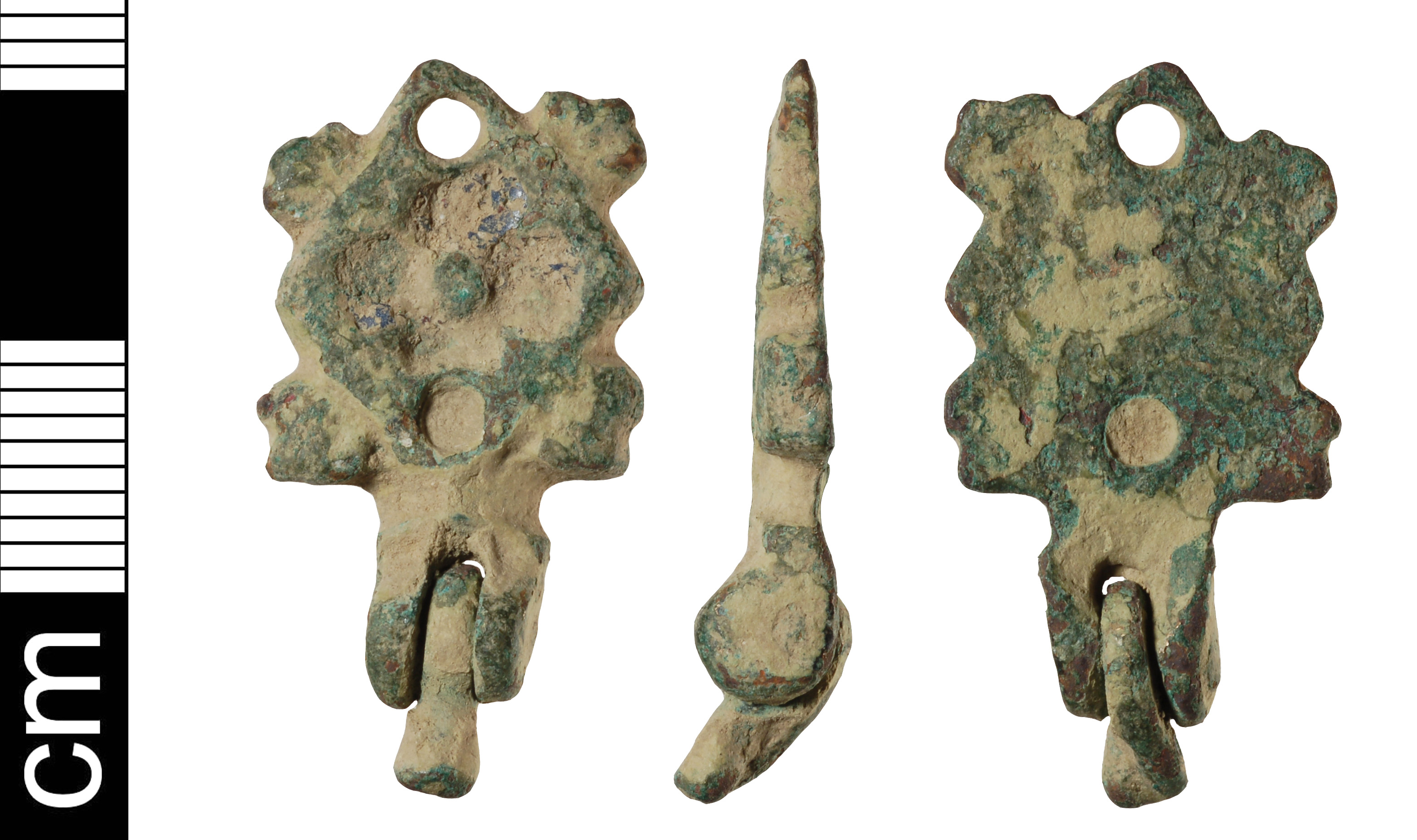
Harness pendant suspension mount featuring two lugs (at the bottom). The pendant has one lug (also named loop), placed in the gap between the two lugs of the hanger

Lugs are the loops (or protuberances) that exist on both arms of a hinge, featuring a hole for the axis of the hinge.

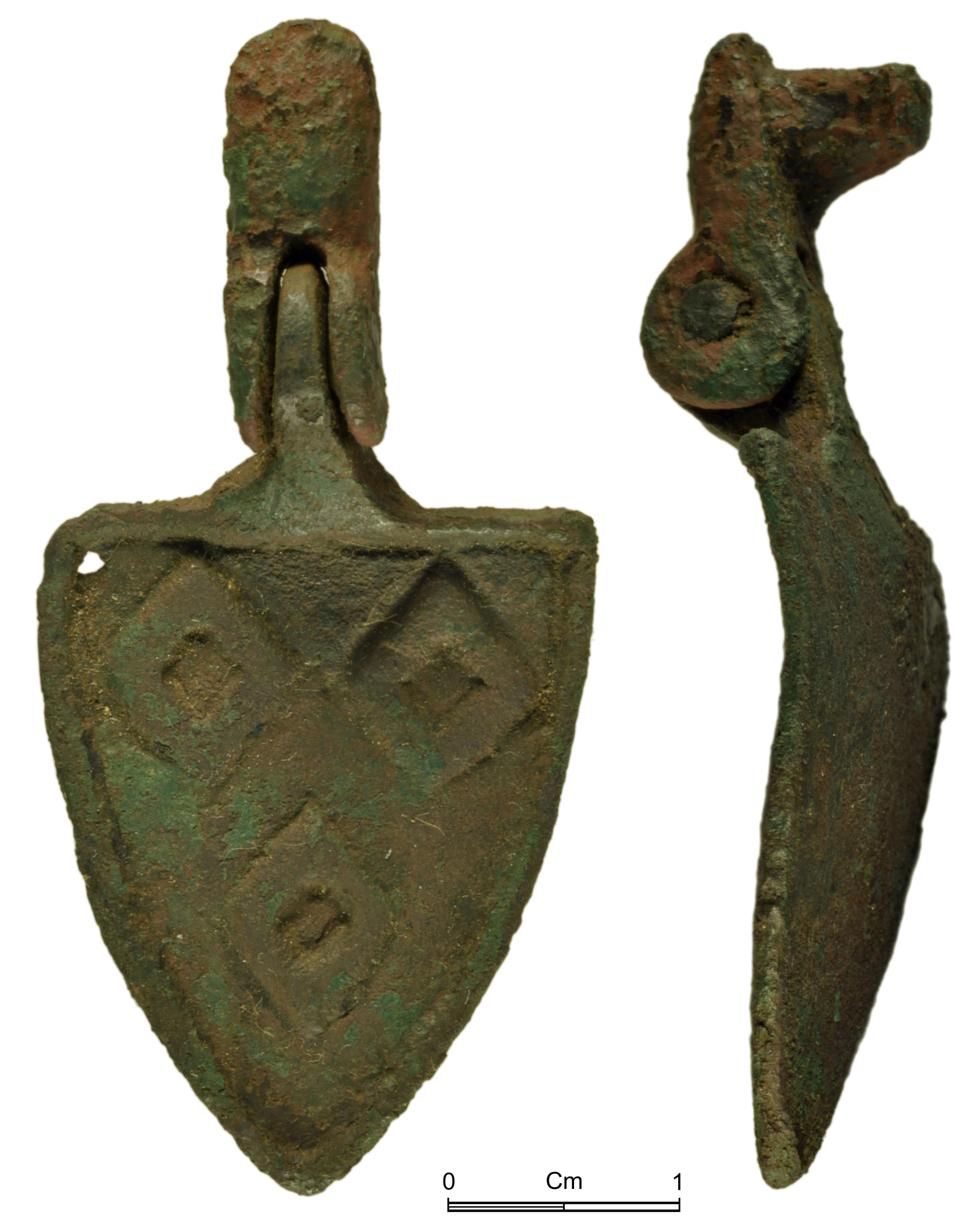

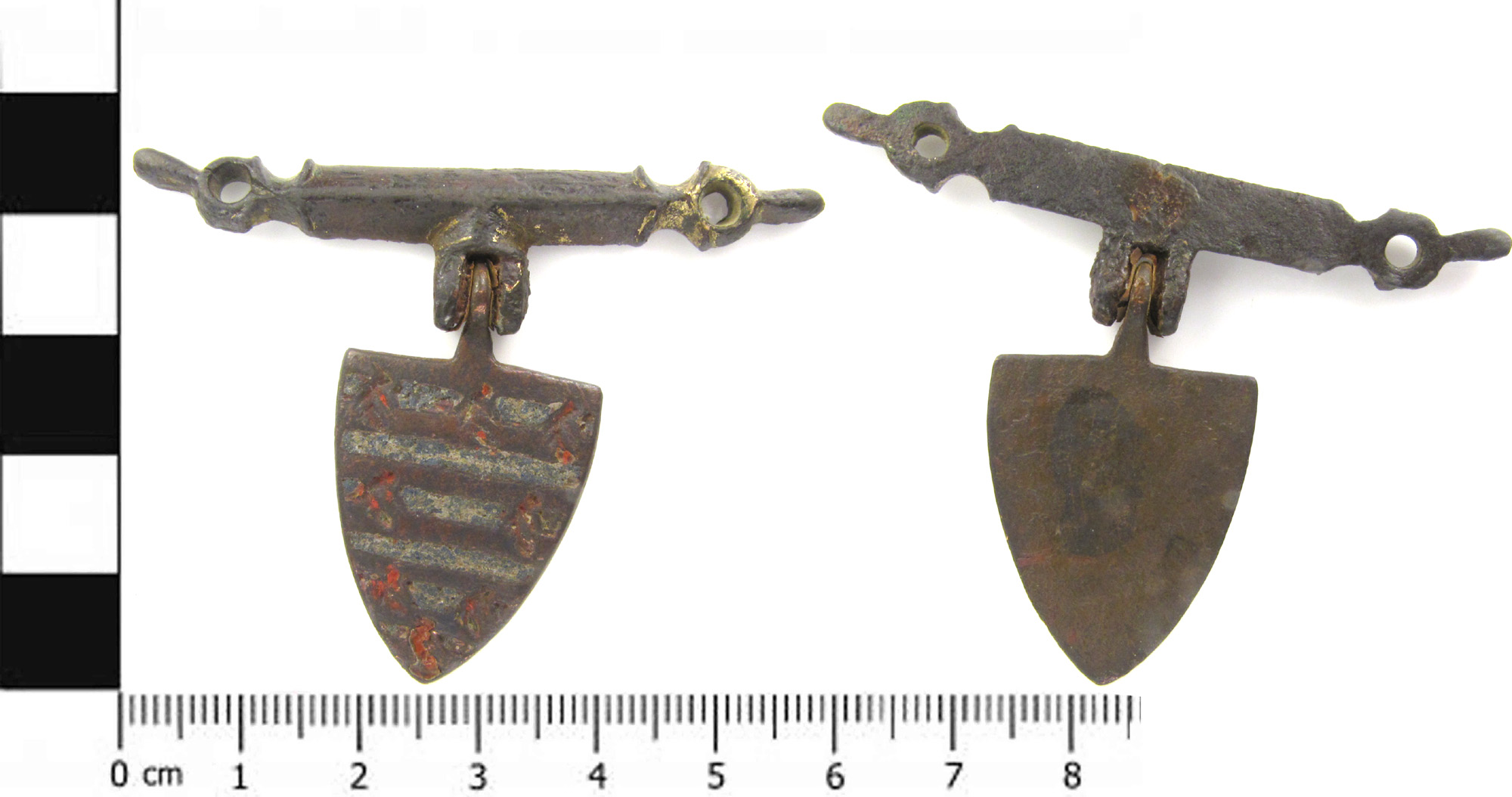

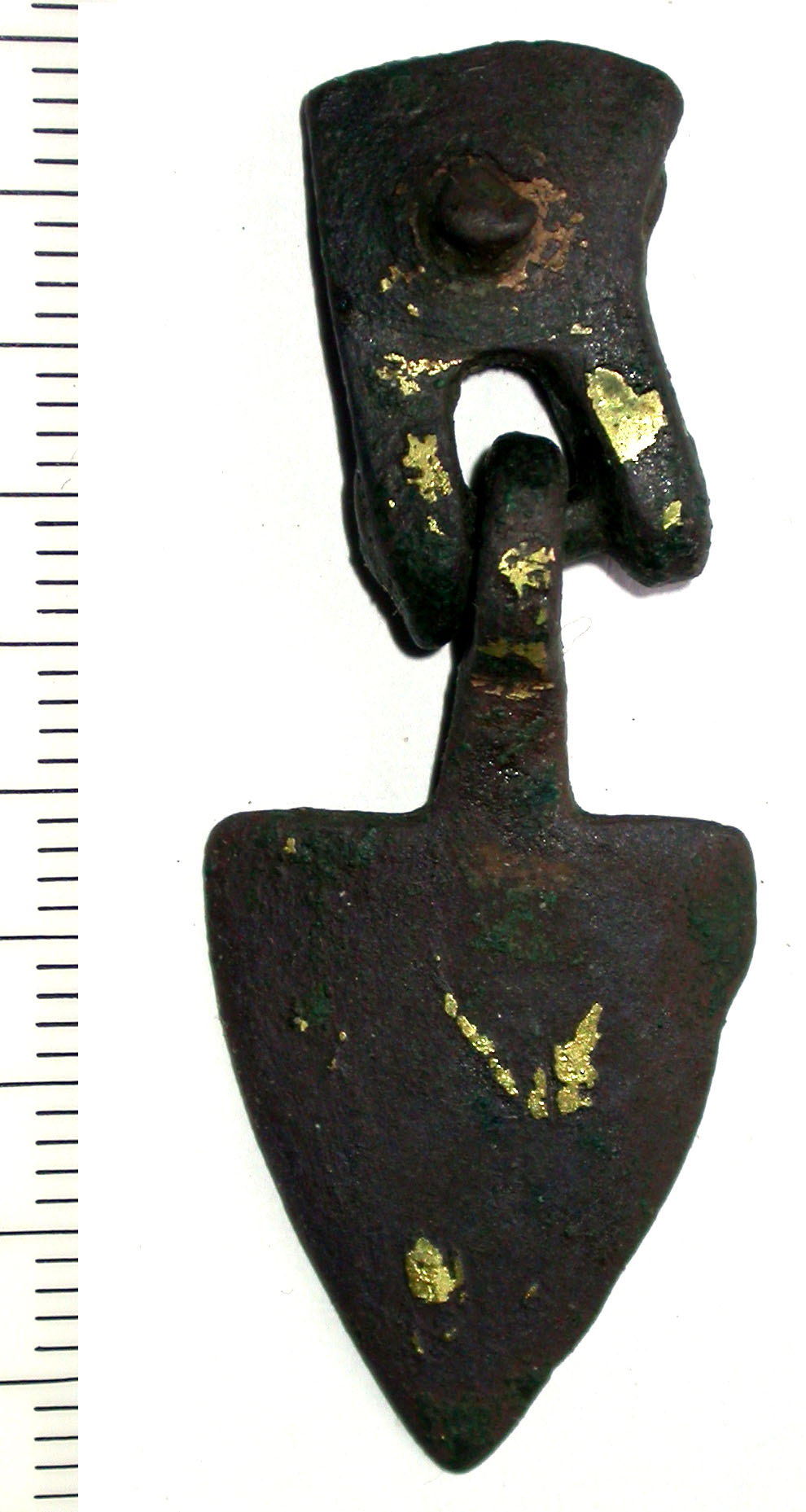
