= Irish Medical Journal =

- Discipline: Medicine
- Language: English
- Edited by: John F. A. Murphy

Publication details
- Former name: Journal of the Irish Medical Association
- History: 1867-present
- Publisher: Irish Medical Organisation (Ireland)
- Frequency: Monthly (combined issues for July/Aug. and Nov./Dec.)

Standard abbreviations
- ISO 4: Ir. Med. J.

Indexing
- CODEN: IMDJBD
- ISSN: 0332-3102
- LCCN: 79018505 sn 79018505
- OCLC no.: 00999721

Links
- Journal homepage; Online access; Online archive

The Irish Medical Journal is a peer-reviewed Irish medical publication founded in 1867. It is the official publication of the Irish Medical Organisation and is a continuation of the Journal of the Irish Medical Association.
