= Stokes (surname) =

Stokes is a surname, and may refer to:

== A ==
- Adrian Stokes (disambiguation)
  - Adrian Scott Stokes (1854–1935), English landscape painter
- Alan and Alex Stokes (born 1996), American internet celebrities
- Alan Stokes (born 1981), British professional surfer and model
- Alec Stokes (1919–2003), English scientist and contributor to discovery of DNA
- Andy Stokes, American football player
- Ann Bradford Stokes (1830–1903), African American nurse
- Anson Phelps Stokes (disambiguation)
  - Anson Phelps Stokes (1838–1913), a merchant, banker, publicist, and multimillionaire
  - Anson Phelps Stokes, (1874–1958), an educator and clergyman
  - Anson Phelps Stokes, (1905–1986), a clergyman
- Anthony Stokes, an Irish footballer
- Antony Stokes (born 1965), British diplomat
- Arthur Stokes (disambiguation)
  - Arthur Stokes (footballer), (1868–1960) English footballer

== B ==
- Barry Stokes (disambiguation)
  - Barry Stokes (born 1973), American football offensive lineman
  - Barry Stokes, British actor
- Ben Stokes (born 1991), former English cricketer
- Bobby Stokes (1951–1995), English footballer
- Brian Stokes (born 1979), American baseball pitcher

== C ==
- Cameron Stokes, Australian footballer
- Carl B. Stokes (1927–1996), mayor of Cleveland, Ohio and first African American mayor of a major U.S. city
- Charles Stokes (disambiguation)
  - Charles Stokes (trader) (1852–1895), Irish missionary turned trader who lived much of his life in Africa
- Chase Stokes, American actor
- Chris Stokes (disambiguation)
  - Chris Stokes (record producer), American record producer
- Claud Stokes (1884–1918), British military aviator
- Colin Stokes (born 1987), American cellist
- Corey Stokes, American basketball player

== D ==
- David Stokes (disambiguation)
  - David Stokes (soccer) (born 1982), American soccer player
  - David Stokes (English footballer), English footballer
  - David Stokes (Guatemalan footballer) (1946–2025), Guatemalan footballer
- Demi Stokes (born 1991), association footballer
- Dennis Stokes (1911–1998), English cricketer
- Derek Stokes, British footballer
- Donald Stokes (disambiguation)
- Doris Stokes (1920–1987), British spiritualist
- Doug Stokes, British academic

== E ==
- Ed Stokes, American basketball player
- Edith Minturn Stokes (1867–1937), American philanthropist, artistic muse and socialite during the Gilded Age.
- Edward Stokes (disambiguation)
  - Edward C. Stokes (1860–1942), the 32nd governor of New Jersey
  - Edward L. Stokes (1880–1964), US Congressman from Pennsylvania
- Elizabeth Joan Stokes (1912–2010), English bacteriologist
- Eric Stokes (disambiguation), multiple people
- Evelyn Stokes, New Zealand geographer

== F ==
- Francis Stokes
  - Francis Marion Stokes (1883–1975), American architect
  - Francis William Stokes (1832–1889), pastoralist and politician in South Australia
- Frank Stokes (disambiguation)
  - Frank Stokes (1888–1955), American blues musician
  - Frank Wilbert Stokes (1858–1955), American artist
- Fred Stokes, American football player
- Frederick Stokes (disambiguation)
  - Frederick Wilfrid Scott Stokes (1860–1927), inventor of the Stokes Mortar

== G ==
- George Stokes (disambiguation)
  - George Gabriel Stokes (1819–1903), Irish mathematician and physicist
  - George Thomas Stokes (1843–1898), Irish ecclesiastical historian
- Gerard Stokes (1955–2020), New Zealand rugby league footballer
- Graham Stokes (disambiguation)
- Greg Stokes (born 1963), American basketball player

== H ==
- Henry Stokes (1841–1926), Irish civil servant
- Henry Scott Stokes (1938–2022), British journalist
- Henry Sewell Stokes (1808–1895), British poet
- Henry William Stokes (1871–1966), American farmer and politician

== I ==
- Isaac Newton Phelps Stokes (1867–1944), American architect

== J ==
- J. J. Stokes, American football player
- J. William Stokes (James William Stokes, 1853–1901), U.S. Representative from South Carolina
- Jack Stokes (disambiguation)
  - Jack Stokes (1923–2000), Canadian politician
- James Stokes
- James Stokes (disambiguation), multiple people
- Jason Stokes, American baseball player
- Jervis Stokes (1927–2016), Australian rules footballer
- John Stokes (disambiguation)
  - John Stokes, mayor of Bristol in 1364, 1366, and 1379
  - John Stokes, Vice-Chancellor of the University of Cambridge 1565–1566
  - John Fisher Stokes (1912–2010), English physician
  - John S. Stokes (1871–1923), Chief Master-at-Arms in the United States Navy and recipient of the Medal of Honor in the Philippine–American War
  - John William Stokes (1910 – c. 1995), Australian administrator
  - John Stokes (1915–1990), Principal of Queen's College, Hong Kong, buried in Wolvercote Cemetery
  - John Heydon Stokes (1917–2003), British Conservative MP 1970–1992
  - Jonathan Stokes (c. 1755 – 1831), English physician and botanist
  - John Edward "Jack" Stokes (1923–2000), Canadian politician, Speaker of the Legislative Assembly of Ontario
  - John Stokes (born 1940), Irish musician
  - John Stokes, a British comics artist best known for Fishboy
- Juanita Stokes, American rapper
- Julie Stokes (born 1970), Louisiana politician

== K ==
- Keith Stokes, American football player
- Kerry Stokes, Australian businessman
- Kiah Stokes, Turkish-American basketball player

== L ==
- Leslie Stokes, BBC radio producer and director
- Loren Stokes, American basketball player
- Lori Stokes, American television journalist
- Louis Stokes, American politician
- Lydia B. Stokes, American philanthropist

== M ==
- Mack B. Stokes, American retired bishop
- Margaret Stokes, Irish antiquarian, artist and author
- Marianne Stokes, born Marianne Preindlsberger (1855–1927), Austrian painter
- Marion Stokes (1929–2012), American archivist, news producer and civil rights activist
- Martin Stokes, British academic
- Mathew Stokes, Australian footballer
- Maura Stokes, American statistician and novelist
- Maurice Stokes (1933–1970), American basketball player
- Missouri H. Stokes (1838–1910), American social reformer, writer
- Michael Stokes (disambiguation), multiple people
- Mitchell Stokes, English cricketer
- Montfort Stokes (1762–1842), American senator and governor of North Carolina

== N ==
- Niall Stokes, Irish editor of the Hot Press magazine
- Nick Stokes, fictional character in the CSI: Crime Scene Investigation TV series

== O ==
- Olivia Stokes (disambiguation)

== P ==
- Patrick Stokes (disambiguation), multiple people
- Pringle Stokes, British Navy officer who commanded HMS Beagle

== R ==
- Rachel Montgomery Stokes (1776–1862), American landowner
- Richard Stokes (disambiguation)
- Ricky Stokes, American men's college basketball coach
- Robert Stokes (disambiguation)
- Rose Pastor Stokes (1879–1933), Russian-born American Socialist Party leader and feminist
- Rufus Stokes (1922–1986), American inventor
- Ruth Stokes (1890–1968), American mathematician

== S ==
- Satyananda Stokes (1882–1946), American-born Indian activist
- Scotty Stokes, American politician
- Sewell Stokes (1902–1979), English writer
- Stan Stokes, American painter
- Steph Stokes, fictional character on the TV show Emmerdale
- Suzanne Stokes, American glamour model and actress

== T ==
- Thomas Lunsford Stokes (1898–1958), American journalist
- Tim Stokes, American football player
- Tobin Stokes, Canadian composer
- Tony Stokes, English footballer
- Trey Stokes, American filmmaker and puppeteer
- Tyran Stokes (born 2007), American basketball player

== W ==
- Walter Stokes (1898–1996), American sport shooter
- Walter W. Stokes (1880–1960), New York state senator
- Whitley Stokes (1830–1909), Irish lawyer and Celtic scholar
- William Stokes (disambiguation), several people
  - William Brickly Stokes (1814–1897), American Civil War soldier and politician
- Willie Stokes (disambiguation), several people
- Winford Stokes (1951–1990), American serial killer

== V ==
- Vidya Stokes, Indian politician

== Y ==
- Yvonne Stokes, Australian mathematician

== See also ==
- Governor Stokes (disambiguation)
- Senator Stokes (disambiguation)
- Stokes (disambiguation)
