= John Stokes =

John Stokes may refer to:

== Politicians ==
- John Stokes (MP for Derby), member of parliament (MP) Derby
- John Stokes (fl.1547), MP for Westbury
- John Stokes (Conservative politician) (1917–2003), British Conservative MP 1970–1992
- Jack Stokes (politician) (John Edward Stokes, 1923–2000), Canadian politician, speaker of the Legislative Assembly of Ontario
- John Stokes (North Carolina judge) (1756–1790), North Carolina attorney, politician, and judge
- John N. Stokes Sr. (died 1905), blacksmith, Baptist minister, sheriff, and politician in Tallahassee, Florida
- J. Ed Stokes (1888–1964), member of the Florida House of Representatives
- John Stoke (MP) (fl. 1363–1381), also known as John Stokes, English politician

== Others ==
- John William Stokes (1910–1995), Australian administrator
- John Stokes (1915–1990), principal of Queen's College, Hong Kong, buried in Wolvercote Cemetery
- John Stokes (born 1936), Irish musician with The Bachelors
- John Stokes (comics), British comic artist who drew stories including Fishboy, Marney and The Invisibles
- John Stokes (cinematographer) (born 1961), Australian cinematographer, see Hurricane Smith
- John Stokes (Medal of Honor) (1871–1923), American Medal of Honor recipient
- John Stokes (archdeacon of York) (died 1568), president of Queens' College, Cambridge
- John Stokes (Irish mathematician) (1720–1781), Irish mathematician
- John Lort Stokes (1811–1885), officer in the Royal Navy
- Jack Stokes (director) (1920–2013), animation director who worked on the 1968 Beatles film Yellow Submarine
- John Stokes (canon of Windsor) (died 1503), canon of Windsor and warden of All Souls College, Oxford
- John Stokes (trade unionist) (c. 1865–1935), leader of the London Labour Party and London Trades Council
- John Stokes (mountaineer) (1945–2016), British Army soldier and mountaineer
- John Arthur Stokes, figure in the civil rights movement
- John F. Stokes (1899–1963), American law enforcement officer
- John Fisher Stokes, physician and surgeon
- John Stokes (archdeacon of Armagh) (1801–1885)
- John Stokes (British Army officer), involved with running the Suez Canal Company
- John Stokes (bishop) (14th–15th century), see Bishop of Kilmore

== See also ==
- Jonathan Stokes (1755–1831), English physician and botanist
- Jonathan W. Stokes, U.S. filmmaker
- John Stoke (disambiguation)
