= Stokes =

Stokes may refer to:

== People ==
- Stokes (surname), a surname (including a list of people with the name)
- Governor Stokes (disambiguation)
- Senator Stokes (disambiguation)

== Science ==
- Stokes (unit), a measure of viscosity
- Stokes boundary layer
- Stokes drift
- Stokes equation (disambiguation)
- Stokes flow
- Stokes' law
- Stokes' law of sound attenuation
- Stokes line
- Stokes number
- Stokes parameters
- Stokes radius
- Stokes relations
- Stokes shift
- Stokes stream function
- Stokes' theorem
- Stokes wave
- Campbell–Stokes recorder
- Navier–Stokes equations

== Places ==
- Stokes Bay (disambiguation)
- Stokes Township (disambiguation)

=== Australia ===
- Stokes, Queensland, a locality in the Shire of Carpentaria, Queensland
- Stokes County, Queensland
- Stokes National Park, in the Goldfields-Esperance region of Western Australia

=== Canada ===
- Stokes Mountain, a mountain in Nunavut
- Stokes Range, a mountain range in Nunavut

=== New Zealand ===
- Stokes Valley, a suburb of Lower Hutt
  - Stokes State Forest, a state park in Sussex County

=== United States ===
- Stokes, North Carolina
- Stokes County, North Carolina
- Stokes State Forest, Sussex County, New Jersey

=== In space ===
- Stokes (lunar crater), Moon
- Stokes (Martian crater), Mars

== Groups, companies, organizations ==
- Stokes Valley RFC, a rugby football club in Stokes Valley, New Zealand
- Frederick A. Stokes Company, a publisher owned by Frederick A. Stokes
- Stoke's, beers made by McCashin's Brewery, Nelson, New Zealand

== Other uses ==
- USS Stokes (AKA-68), a US Navy cargo ship
- Stokes mortar, a weapon

== See also ==
- Stokes House (disambiguation)
- Stoke (disambiguation)
