= Stokes Township, Minnesota =

Stokes Township, Minnesota could refer to the following places:

- Stokes Township, Itasca County, Minnesota
- Stokes Township, Roseau County, Minnesota

== See also ==
- Stokes Township (disambiguation)
