= Whitley Stokes =

Whitley Stokes may refer to:

- Whitley Stokes (Celtic scholar) 1830–1909), Irish lawyer and Celtic scholar, grandson of the physician
- Whitley Stokes (physician) (1763–1845), Irish physician and polymath
