= Commissions of the Danube River =

International river management bodies

The Commissions of the Danube River were authorized by the Treaty of Paris (1856) after the close of the Crimean War. One of these international commissions, the most successful, was the European Commission of the Danube, or, in French, Commission Européenne du Danube, the CED, which had authority over the three mouths of the river — the Chilia in the north, the Sulina in the middle, and the St. George in the south and which was originally designed to last for only two years. Instead, it lasted eighty-two years. A separate commission, the International Danube Commission, or IDC, was authorized to control commerce and improvements upriver beyond the Danube Delta and was supposed to be permanent, but it was not formally organized until after 1918.

== International stature ==
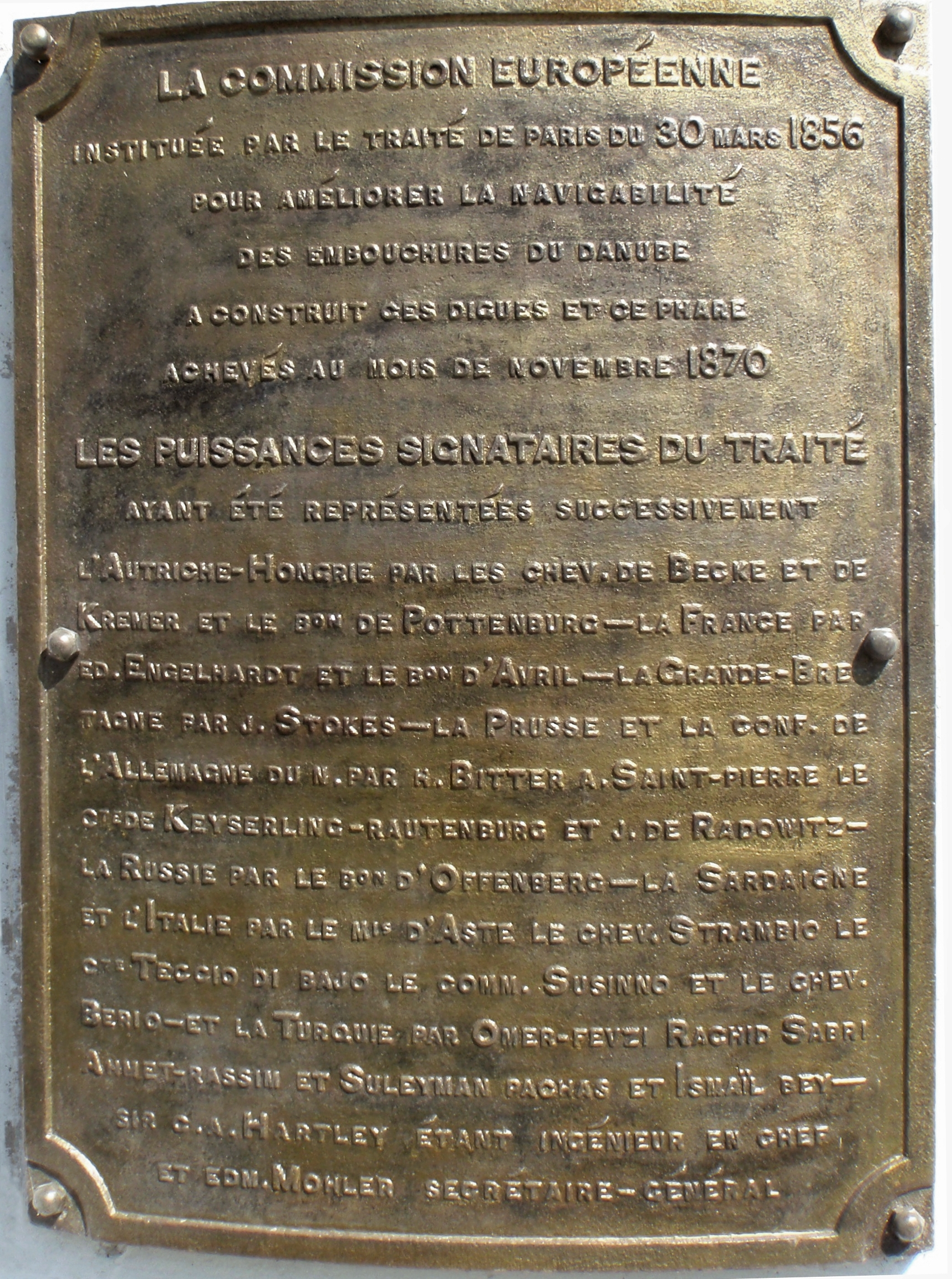
Commemorative plaque at a lighthouse in Sulina, Tulcea county, Romania, built by the European Commission along with river dykes and completed in November 1870

The European Commission of the Danube was the first — and for a long time the only — international body to have serious police and juridical powers over private vessels and individual people, and it was seen in 1930, for example, by history professor Glen A. Blackburn of the United States as a "unique" organization.

Without territorial possessions, it is nevertheless a distinct international entity, possessing sovereignty over the broad waters of the Danube. . . . These entirely discretionary functions need the sanction of no group of nations, and there is no appeal from the edicts of the Commission.

The lower section of the Danube, he continued, was "more than an internationalized river" because the CED wielded independent administrative powers. He concluded that the commission:

falls short of being a bona fide member of the family of nations because its existence is largely de facto and not de jure. . . . It is safe to predict that the need for protecting the integrity of the commission will some day lift it out of the twilight of statehood and accord it full membership in the League of Nations.

To the contrary, Joseph L. Kunz, a professor of international law at the University of Toledo in Ohio, wrote in 1945 that international river commissions were organized on the collegiate principle, composed of "persons appointed by the contracting states, representing them and having to act in conformity with the instructions of their states." They were, he concluded, objects, not subjects, of international law.

Stanford University history professor Edward Krehbiel suggested in 1918 that other "international administrative agents" like the Danube Commission would eventually be created to handle specific problems. Their activities would "develop a whole body of rules which will in effect be the foundation of the super-state itself." The commission, he said:

offers an organ through which nations can approach one another on the basis of common or united action, instead of as rivals, as is the case in an ambassadorial conference.

In regard to the CED, he noted that the tariffs were to be settled by a majority vote of the commissioners and that "Majority rule results in making law for the minority, and . . . it therefore represents a truly profound abasement of national sovereignty."

The establishments of the CED were guaranteed to be neutral (promulgated in 1865) and free of the restraints of the territorial authorities. It owned and operated a hospital for seamen of all countries, and it flew a flag ("composed of five parallel strips . . . arranged in the following order of colour: — red, white, blue, white, and red, the blue strip having a height double that of each of the other strips, and bearing in white the letters 'C.E.D.' ")

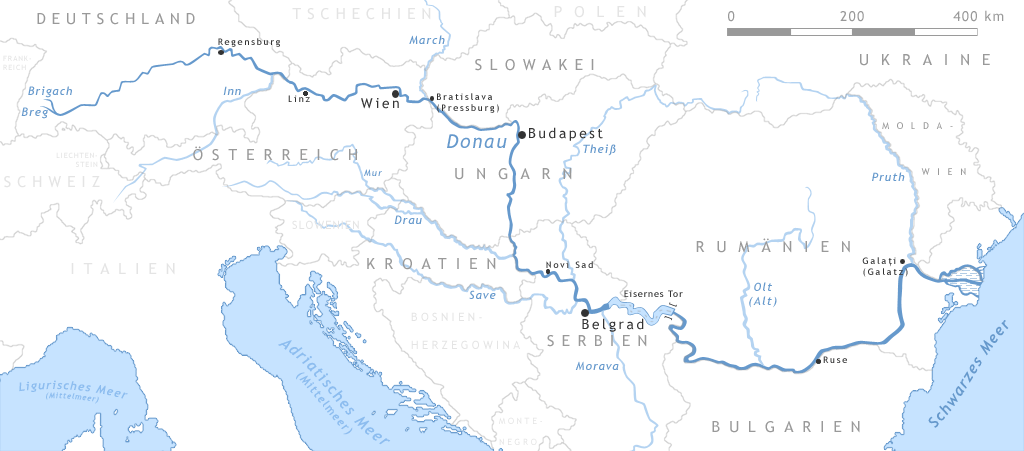
Modern map of the Danube

Joanne Yao argues that the Danube Commission sought to connect Europe to the east, and more specifically Russia. By increasing commerce, the Danube would promote industrialization in Eastern Europe, and with it civilization. These ideals were problematized by traders coming in the opposite direction, which opened Europe to "uncivilized" outsiders.

== Organizing ==
The CED began its work by fixing the seat of the commission in the port of Galatz and ordering temporary improvements of the Sulina branch. Under the chairmanship of Sir John Stokes, Crimean War veteran of the British Royal Engineers, the commission hastened to get the job done within the two years originally allotted by the treaty. It was under a mandate to:

designate and to cause to be executed the Works necessary below Isatcha, to clear the mouths of the Danube, as well as the neighbouring parts of the Sea, from the sands and other impediments which obstruct them, in order to put that part of the River and the said parts of the Sea in the best possible state for Navigation.... It is understood that the European Commission shall have completed its task . . . within the period of two years.

At the end of the two years, the powers that signed the treaty were to "pronounce the dissolution of the European Commission", and the so-called "permanent", upstream, IDC was then to extend its supervision to the Lower Danube. The latter commission was supposed to consist of Austria-Hungary, Bavaria, the Sublime Porte (Turkey), Württemberg and the two Danubian principalities (Moldavia and Wallachia). The IDC did draw up an Upper Danubian Navigation Act in November 1857, but it was not accepted multilaterally because of opposition of all the powers except Austria. It was, however, applied to parts of the river by conventions between Austria, Bavaria, and Württemberg. The river-bordering states, Krehbiel stressed in his 1918 article, "were eager to get control of the river into their own hands", but the non-riparian states were "loath to lose control." As a result, the CED was constantly strengthened, and the IDC never came into power, but "was presently abandoned."

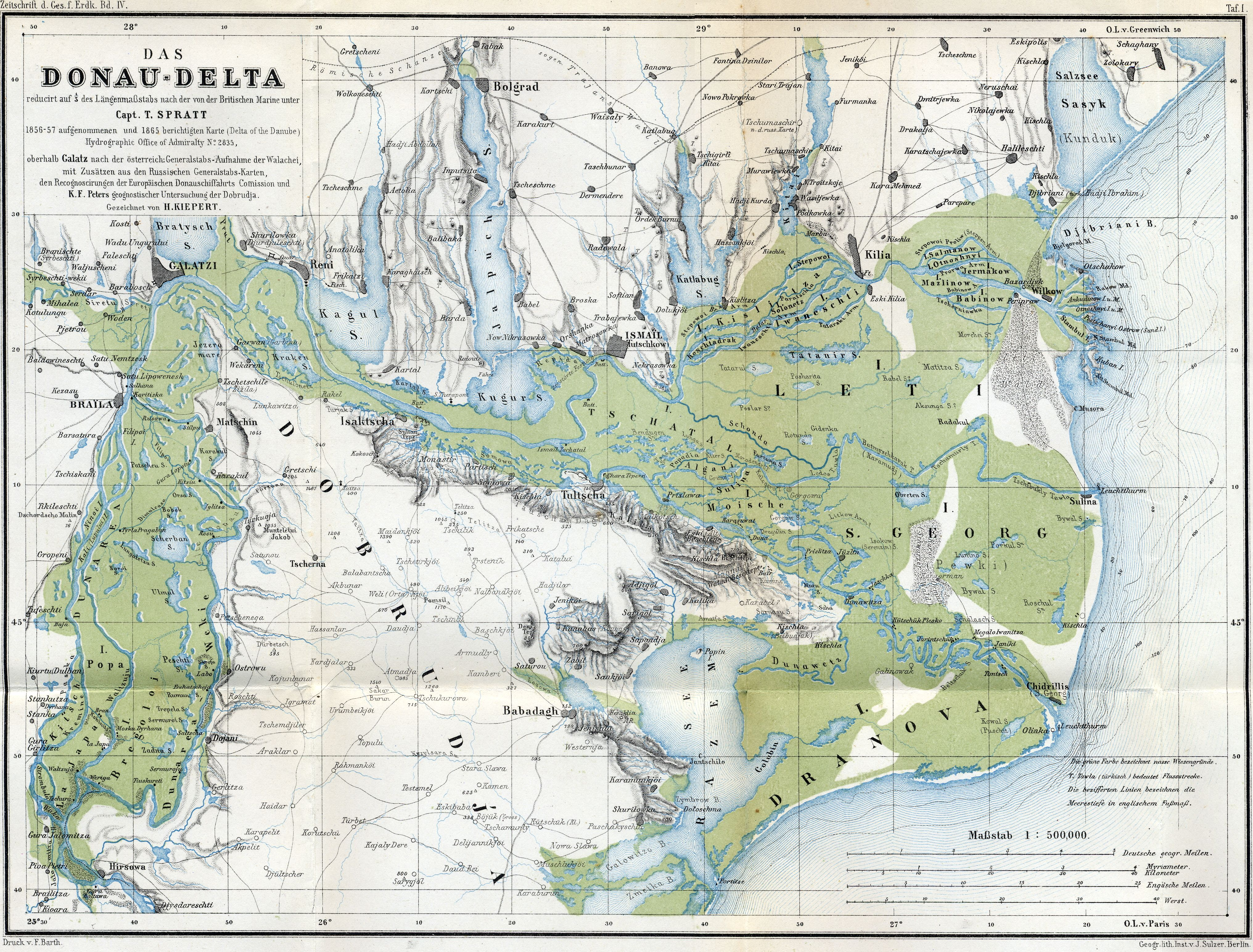
Mouths of the Danube as shown on an 1867 map

The CED gradually extended its power until it became an international entity glimmering in what Blackburn called "the twilight of statehood." It expanded its functions until it was ranked "the most successful" such agency until the League of Nations. At the start, though, it had no funds, "it had no basis for an opinion as to the best way to attack the river problem; it found river traffic paralyzed." At the end of the two years, Sir Charles Hartley, war comrade of Stokes, had been appointed chief engineer (a post he was to hold for forty-nine years) but large-draft vessels were unable to sail unimpeded up the meandering river. These meager results led the powers to extend the life of the commission for another two years, over the objection of Austria.

== Finance ==
Funds were borrowed from Turkey to pay for improvements, but they came irregularly. Sometimes the CED had to contract short-term, high-rate loans. By 1860, though, traffic had increased enough so the commission could fix a tariff and get a good amount of money. There was no opposition from the vessels, thanks to a provision in the Treaty of Paris that each of the powers had "the right to station, at all times, Two Light Vessels at the Mouths of the Danube." What resulted was the establishment of the CED as "an international financial agent with considerable independence . . . the novel prerogative was that it could go into the money market and contract loans."

In 1866, the commission found itself in financial trouble because of the just-ended Austro-Prussian War. But it secured money by issuing bonds, offering the river tolls as security. "To be sure, the rate of 10 per cent was high, but the significant fact is that the joint agent of the nations was developing a real identity and personality. Its venturesomeness was rewarded with complete solvency.

== Public Act of 1865 ==
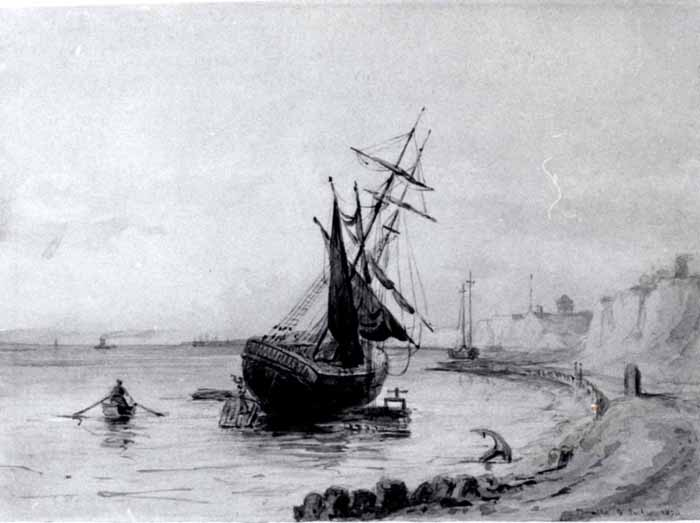
View of the river at Braila in 1870; a ship in drydock

On November 2, 1865, a public act signed by Austria, Britain, France, Italy, Prussia, Russia, and Turkey placed the CED, its officers, works and establishments "under the protection of international law" (Article I). Two annexes were appended — one on navigation regulations and the other on a tariff of "navigation dues to be levied at the mouth of the Danube." The new tariff, principally the work of John Stokes, established a Danubian rule or Danube rule of measurement.

The unique provision of the 1865 act was that either of the two annexes could be changed by a majority vote of the commission but the changes would be automatically binding on the member nations, without need for additional consent. Duties of the officers were spelled out, neutrality of the buildings, records, and funds was ordered, and certain portions of Turkish territory were reserved for exclusive use of the CED. Its life was extended for another five years, but Russia protested that this "should be the outside limit not to be exceeded in any case."

== London Conference of 1871 ==
In 1871 at a conference in London, Russia agreed with Austria-Hungary, Britain, Germany, Italy, and Turkey to extend the commission's term for another twelve years, which coincided with the redemption period of a large loan floated in 1865. The conference also:

1. Rejected Britain's suggestion to extend the commission's jurisdiction farther up the river.
2. Agreed to a "reassembling of the Riverain Commission" — but at no set time.
3. Gave Austria the authority to set up a toll-collecting agency at the dangerous Iron Gates section to pay for improvements there.
4. Extended the neutrality spelled out in the Treaty of 1865 to the staff of the CED, as well as the buildings and works.

== Treaty of Berlin of 1878 ==
In 1878, Romania, which had been an autonomous principality within the Ottoman Empire since 1861, was admitted to an expanded CED as a free country as a result of the Treaty of Berlin (1878). It replaced Turkey as the sovereign power on the delta and was given a seat on the CED. Turkey remained a member of the body.

Russia was the winner of the Russo-Turkish War, and she took over an old strip of Bessarabia detached from her in 1856. This placed Russia again on the banks of the Danube. The other Danubian arrangements were:

1. The jurisdiction of the CED was extended from Isatcha to Galatz.
2. The powers agreed that regulations would be formulated for the upriver stretch from Galatz to the Iron Gates by a "mixed" European commission, "assisted by Delegates of the Riverain States, and placed in harmony with those which have been or may be issued for the portion of the river below Galatz." In the end, a new scheme was adopted for the IDC — Austria, Romania, Serbia, and Bulgaria would each have a representative on the IDC, and each of the members of the other commission, the CED, would serve alternating terms on the IDC for six months at a time. Austria would be chair, but with no tie-breaking vote.

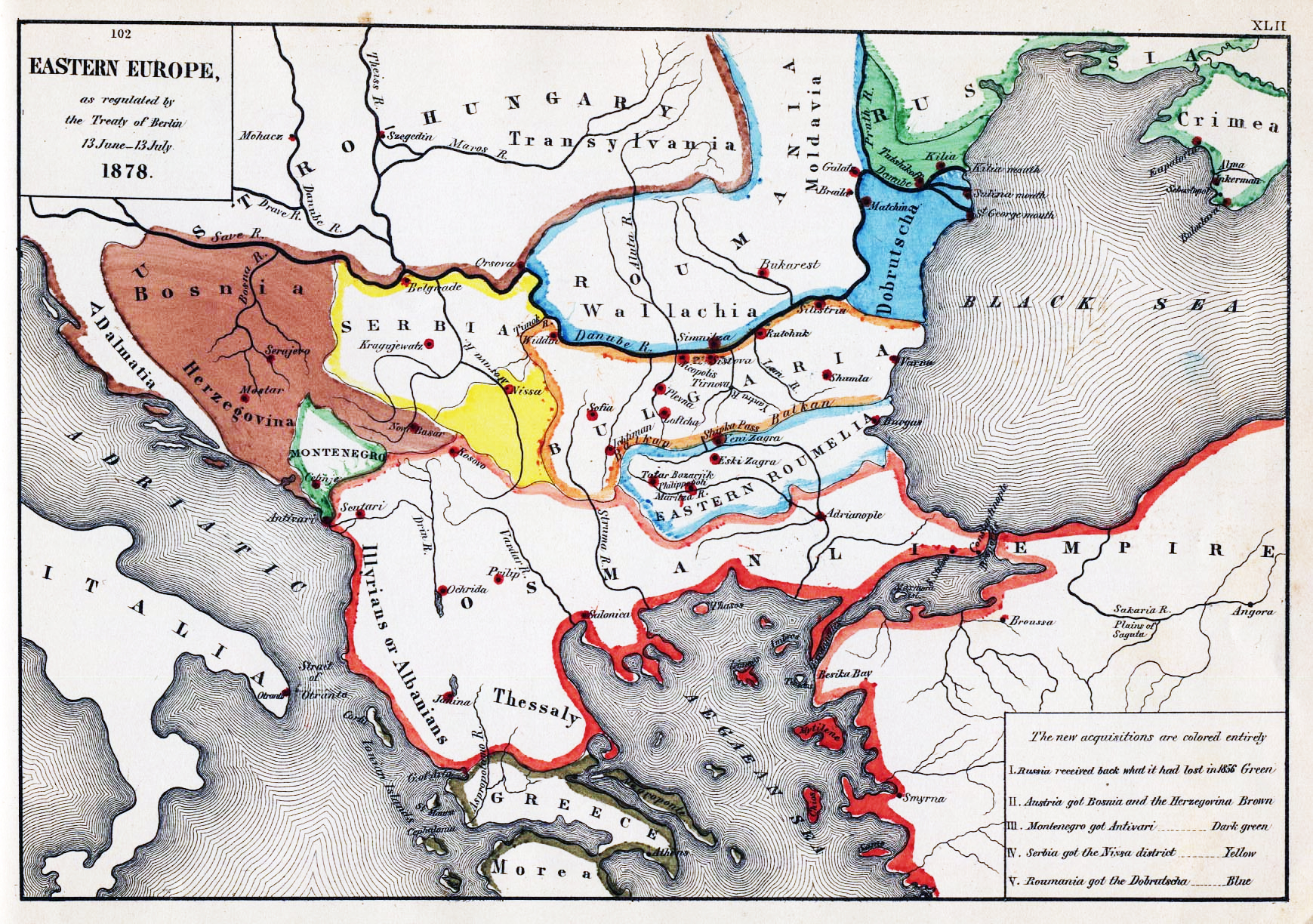
Southeastern Europe after the Congress of Berlin

== Additional Public Act of 1881 ==
In 1881, the interested countries gathered at Galatz to promulgate another treaty, or, as it was termed, a public act, that spelled out details of the CED's relations with Romania, which was striving for more authority. It was then that Russia withdrew her territory from the EDC's jurisdiction — the left bank of the Kilia, over which the CED had so far not exercised its right of control. Russia's action was a last-minute affair, done through a reservation to the treaty.

== Treaty of London of 1883 ==
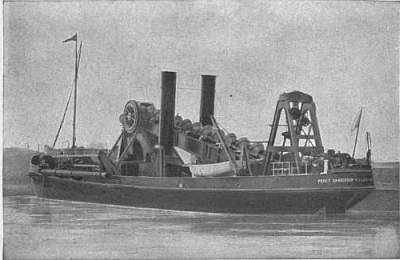
Percy Sanderson, British-built dredger of the Danube Commission in 1911

In 1883, Austria, Britain, France, Germany, Italy, Russia, and Turkey were represented at another conference, this time in London. A majority decided to admit Romania and Serbia in a consultative capacity only and that Bulgaria could be represented only through Turkey, the nominal suzerain. Serbia accepted, but Romania and Bulgaria protested, taking no part in the conference.

After a month of discussion, the delegates decided to:

1. Extend the jurisdiction of the CED from Galatz some twenty miles upstream to Ibraila [nowadays known as Brăila].
2. Authorize the establishment of the reorganized "mixed" commission (the IDC), with the hope that Romania and Bulgaria would agree.
3. Prolong the term of the CED for twenty-one years, after which it would continue for three-year periods, unless changes were proposed by one of the major powers.
4. Accede to Russia's request regarding the Kilia — that is, allow that country and Romania joint control over the branch, provided the CED reviewed any plans for improvement.

Detailed and liberal rules drawn up in this convention for the Danube between Ibraila upstream to the Iron Gate were never applied. Romania did not agree, "and the stretch of the Danube was administered by each riparian state, with due regard, however, to the principle of free navigation."

As conditions in the delta improved, shipping increased and more funds were received by the CED. Conditions improved: There were 111 shipwrecks of seagoing vessels between 1861 and 1881, but only five wrecks between 1909 and 1929

== First World War ==
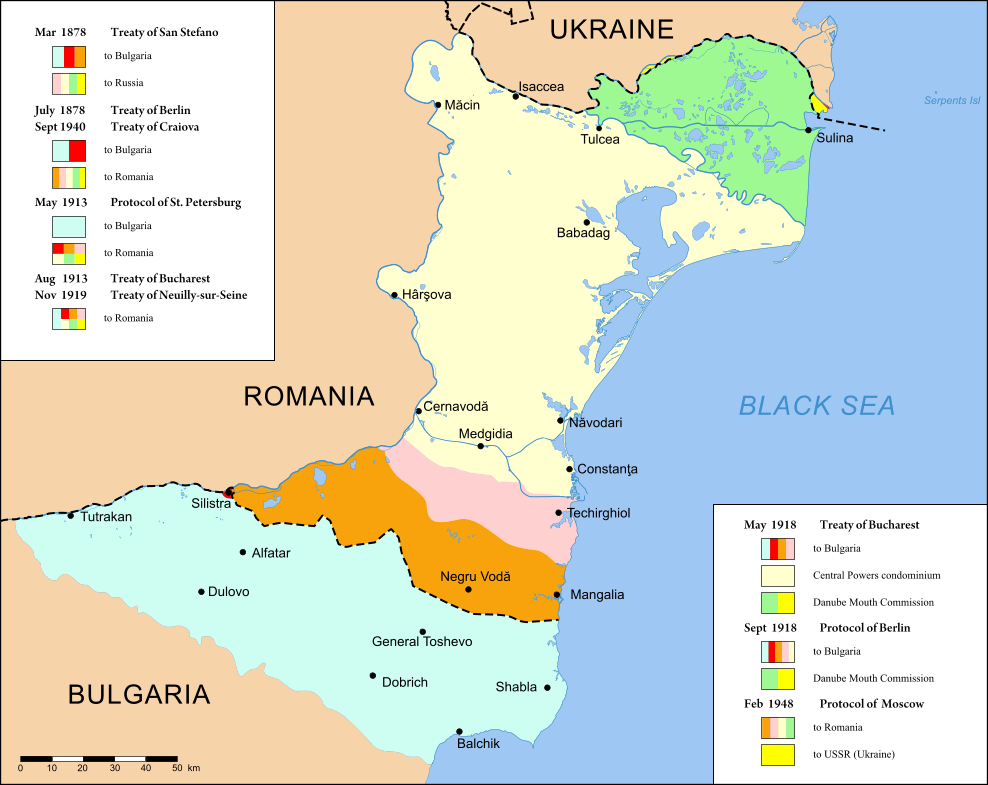
Map showing the Danube Commission during World war I after the Treaty of Bucharest and treaty of Berlin in green and yellow

The European Commission of the Danube, the CED, continued functioning during at least the first two years of the war, and delegates from the Allies and the Central Powers continued to meet together. After Romania attacked Austria-Hungary in 1916, the Central Powers (Germany, Austria-Hungary, Bulgaria, and Turkey) kept the commission in operation for a short time — but without the British and the French. Indeed, the Germans attempted to legalize a commission that would have perpetually excluded the Allied powers. on May 7, 1918, they concluded a separate peace with the Romanians, changing the EDC into a Commission of the Mouth of the Danube; its competence was maintained, but membership was restricted to Danubian or Black Sea countries; above Braila, control was to be "in the hands of the countries bordering the river", that is, Romania, Bulgaria, Serbia, Austria-Hungary, and Germany. Germany, Austria-Hungary, Bulgaria, Turkey, and Romania obtained the right to keep warships on the river; this led, as a reaction, to the internationalization of the river between Ulm and the Black Sea after the war. The same stipulations were included in the peace treaty between Germany and Russia in 1918.

These treaties were negated upon Allied victory. In November 1918 the victors established a Commandement de la Navigation du Danube, with Sir Ernest Troubridge as commander. The Allies' Supreme Committee decided on May 22, 1919, that "despite the existing uncertainty concerning the frontiers and the ownership of the floating material, normal conditions of traffic on the Danube should be established as soon as possible", and an Inter-Allied Danube Commission was formed under Troubridge. Later in the year, non-enemy states were admitted on an equal footing with the great powers; the group met with some success in reopening the river, despite the difficulties.

Peace treaties imposed by the Allies set up new regulations for the river: The old European Commission resumed its power over the mouths of the river, but its membership was "temporarily" limited to Britain, France, Italy, and Romania (excluding, then, Russia and Turkey). In addition, an International Commission was thenceforth to regulate traffic on the Upper Danube from Ulm to Braila. A general conference was planned for the future.

== Reorganizing ==
The conference convened in Paris in September 1920 to draw up a definitive statute for the river. Represented were Austria, Belgium, Bulgaria, Czechoslovakia, France, Germany, Great Britain, Greece, Hungary, Italy, Romania, and Yugoslavia, Absent from a full-dress Danubian conference for the first time were Russia, then in the first years of rule by the Bolsheviks, and Turkey. It took six months, but on July 23, 1921, the basic convention was signed. It followed to a large extent the temporary framework built just after the war. The European Commission of the Danube was re-established, and all the old treaties and regulations were confirmed.

The International Danube Commission (upriver) was finally given a permanent status, made a subject of international law like the EDC, and provided with regulations that gave it life. It, however, had no law courts of its own; it was obliged to surrender transgressors to the territorial authorities for trial and punishment. Members included all the riparian states, as well as Great Britain, France, Italy, and Romania.

Otto Popper of Bratislava, secretary of the IDC in 1920–29, said this about the statute when viewing it twenty years later:

Unfortunately this fundamental document was drafted during a period when much of the original spirit of [President Woodrow] Wilson's Fourteen Points was beginning to fade. As it stands the Statute is a somewhat unsatisfactory compromise between broad conceptions and narrow-mindedness. Its text gave rise to varying interpretations[,] and some of its important stipulations were therefore not applied, as had been hoped, in the best interests of the river and of its navigation.

John C. Campbell, Eastern European specialist with the U.S. State Department, wrote in 1949 that just as the Paris conference in 1856, had striven to block "Russian domination" in Southeastern Europe after the Crimean War, so the 1921 convention "stood for an effort to block the resurgence of German or Russian power."

== Reconstruction ==
The European Commission, again ensconced in its quarters at Galatz, found things very bad indeed at the mouths of the Danube after the war. Silt had choked the channel again, and it seemed as though attempts to improve the situation was continually going awry.

Economic affairs along the entire river were so bad that the League of Nations instituted in 1922 an inquiry by a special committee, headed by an American, Walker D. Hines (Wilson's wartime chief of railroads). His report was issued in August 1925, stating that the river fleet carried 25 percent more tonnage than before the war, but traffic was only 56 percent of normal. This reduction was largely due to an economic depression but also by the breakup of Austria-Hungary's large duty-free area. Hines scored the "petty attitudes" of the multitude of free governments and complained of the frontier formalities and the exclusion of non-nationals from international trade. Despite the existence of the EDC and the IDC, the situation had "changed but little since the end of the war."

This report led the Commercial and Financial Chronicle of New York City to suggest, in particular, the reduction of "dues which it [the EDC] has imposed." British interests since 1918 had turned the Danube into a virtual European Thames. Before the war, reported Clair Price of the New York Times,

the Danube was in the hands of riverain [river-bordering] groups, but since then Furness, Withy and Co., large United Kingdom shipholders, have obtained a virtual monopoly. . . . It operates a steamer service from British ports to the Levant [Eastern Mediterranean], the Black Sea and to Sulina, Galatz and Braila, where British tonnage has long been preponderant.

The company had obtained this monopoly by refinancing the war-stricken prewar firms, most of which were owned by Austrian or Hungarian interests (the losers in the war). A holding company, the Danube Navigation Co., was organized, and astute financial maneuvering gave to Furness, Withy "the practical control of the traffic of the navigable length of the Danube."

== Romania's struggle for control ==
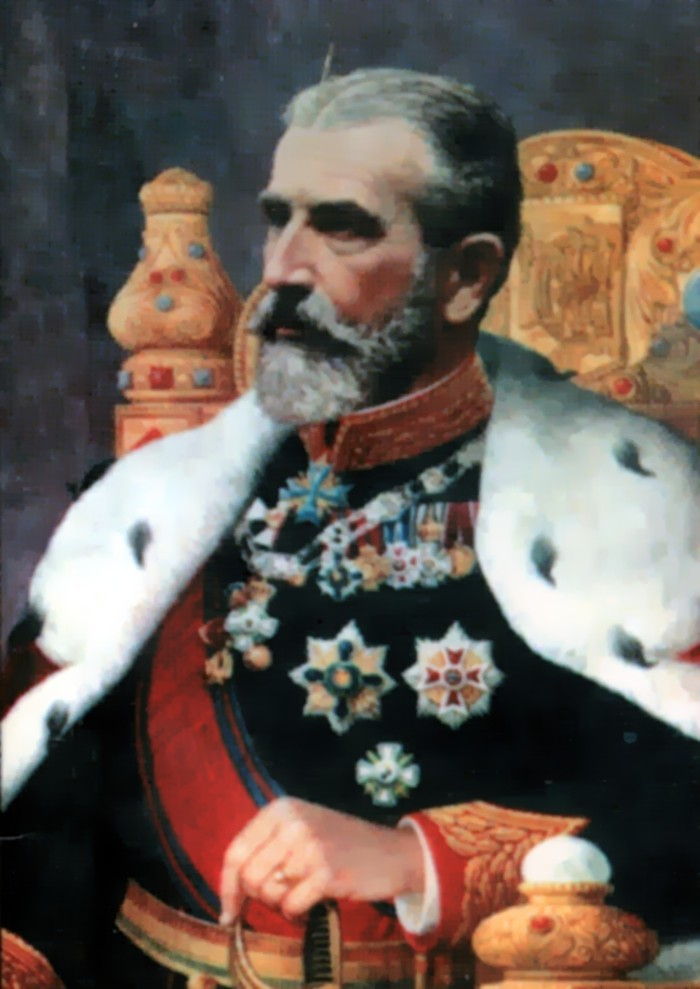
Carol I of Romania

Meanwhile, Romania desired the outright abolition of the CED, having made the suggestion for the first time in 1881, when King Carol said he would insist on the mouths being "exclusively controlled by Romanian officials." This statement led to a break with Austria-Hungary, and Carol was forced late in the year to dispatch a message of " 'deep regret' for the offense that had been given to Austria."

The country renewed its demands in 1919 at the Paris Peace Conference and in 1921 at the Danube Conference. On both instances, it was overruled. Romania changed tactics, but not motives, at the Conference of Lausanne in 1923, when affairs of the Middle East were discussed. On this occasion, Romania suggested that the powers of the CED should be expanded; it would also be given control over the Bosporus and the Dardanelles.

Of course the acceptance of this proposal would have meant the end of effective control of the Danube, for the Commission, far from the mouths of the Danube and charged with new tasks, would have hardly been able to fulfill its primary tasks, and the actual control of the Lower Danube would have devolved upon Rumania.

wrote Joseph D. Somogyi in 1948.

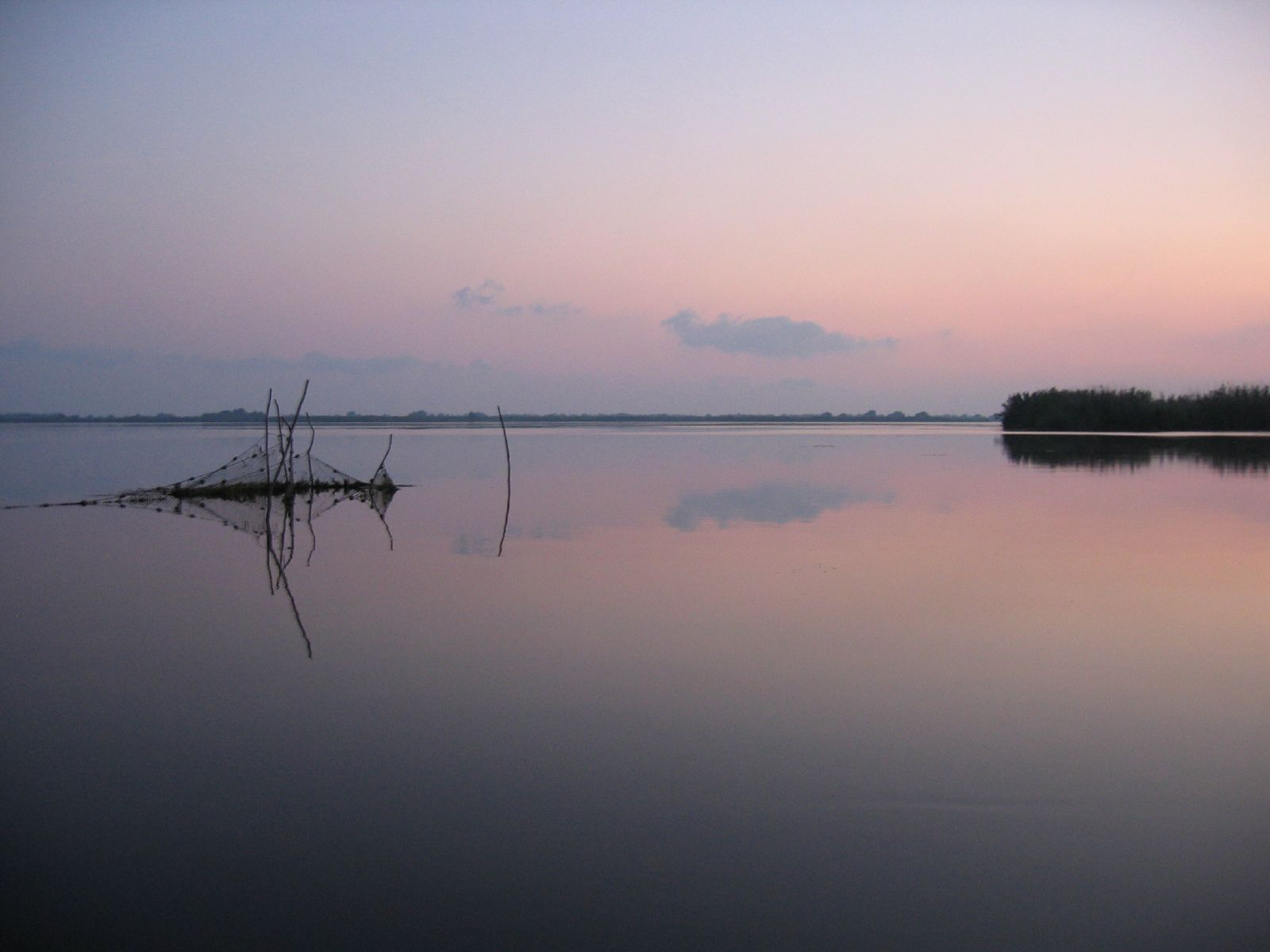
A 2004 photo of the Sulina Channel of the Danube River, leading to the Black Sea

In 1924, Romania suggested that the activities of the commission be limited; that country would be charged with trial and punishment of shipping violators, similar to the method used by the newer, upriver International Danube Commission. This suggestion also was rejected by the other powers. Balked internationally, the Romanian government began an internal propaganda campaign in 1926 to nationalize the Sulina channel, even without the concurrence of the other nations. Spokesmen claimed the CED had failed to keep the channel clear, resulting in a situation where only empty boats could cross it; the commission replied that the silt had piled up during the war when Romania had full control.

Meanwhile, Romania resorted to a lawsuit to assert its jurisdiction over an upriver stretch. It noted that the jurisdiction of the CED had been extended up the river from Galatz to Ibraila by the Treaty of London of 1883, in the framing and signing of which Romania had not participated. In 1921 two vessels collided in the disputed sector, and the CED's inspector assumed police and jurisdictional powers over Romania's protest. The case was taken to the League of Nations, which in 1926 sent the matter to the Permanent Court of International Justice at the request of Britain, France, Italy, and Romania. The latter country lost on all counts. The court decided the CED's powers "extend over the whole of the maritime Danube."

Romania finally achieved effective control of the Lower Danube in May 1939, when the Sinaia Agreement (concluded on 18 August 1938) entered into force.

== End of the prewar commissions ==
In 1938, a committee of experts inspected the Sulina and found it was almost impassable by that time. In August of that same year, the regime of the two commissions was swept away by rise of German power on the river. A series of treaties put control in the hands of the Germans, who maintained it until the Nazi retreat in 1944 and ultimate defeat in 1945. In 1948, a Danube river conference was held, and a new treaty was adopted, putting governance of the river under commissions composed only of the riparian powers, ending more than four decades of Western European presence in the control of the important waterway.

== See also ==
A series of articles on this subject in chronological order

- Internationalization of the Danube River, for events from earliest times to the Treaty of Paris in 1856
- Nazi rule over the Danube River, for events during World War II
- Danube River Conference of 1948
- Danube Commission, for events since 1948
- International Commission for the Protection of the Danube River, for the organization established in 1998 and charged with environmental and ecological activities
