= Adrian Stokes (physician) =

Irish physician (1887–1927)

- Born: 9 February 1887; Lausanne, Switzerland
- Died: 19 September 1927 (aged 40); Lagos, Nigeria
- Resting place: Ikoyi Cemetery
- Citizenship: British
- Education: Trinity College Dublin
- Known for: Discovery of yellow fever virus Discovery of vector of leptospirosis
- Scientific career
- Fields: Microbiology, pathology
- Workplaces: Royal Army Medical Corps; Trinity College Dublin; University of London (Guy's Hospital)

Captain Adrian Stokes, DSO OBE FRCSI MRCP (9 February 1887 – 19 September 1927) was an Irish physician and microbiologist and British Army soldier who worked as professor of bacteriology at Trinity College Dublin, and later as Sir Willian Dunn Professor of Pathology in the University of London at Guy's Hospital. He served in the Royal Army Medical Corps during World War I and was member of the Yellow Fever Commission in West Africa.

Stokes is most well known for his discovery of the virus (now named Orthoflavivirus flava) that caused yellow fever, the disease with which he died. He also discovered a bacterium Spirochaeta icterohaemorrhagiae (now called Leptospira interrogans), which causes epidemic jaundice (and other symptoms now collectively called leptospirosis), in rats which directly implied rodent control as the most important preventive measure. He developed nasal cannula used for giving oxygen through the nose.

== Early life and education ==
Stokes was born at Lausanne, Switzerland, to Henry John Stokes (1842 – 1920) and Mary Anne Macdougal (1843 – 1924). He was the youngest of eight children, among three brothers and five sisters. His father was an Indian Civil Service officer, the profession followed by his elder brother, Henry. His uncle (father's brother) Whitley Stokes was a noted Celtic scholar, and aunt Margaret Stokes, an antiquarian and writer, and his grandfather William Stokes and great grandfather Whitley Stokes both served as Regius Professor of Physic at Trinity College Dublin.

Stokes attended the St Stephen's Green School in Dublin for elementary education. In 1904, he won the John Robertson medal for an English essay. He entered Trinity College in 1905 studying history in the first year and then turning to medicine from the second year. During his senior class in 1909, he published his first scientific paper titled "Abnormal Position of the Heart and Great Blood-Vessels associated with Transposition of the Viscera" in the Journal of Anatomy as a single author. He was secretary of the Dublin University Biological Association, which helped in maintain connections with the association and associated scientists throughout his career. In 1910, he graduated with degrees in Bachelor of Medicine, Bachelor of Surgery (MB BCh), obtaining first-class honours and winning the Bank's prize. He obtained Doctor of Medicine (MD) the next year.

== Career ==
Stokes was appointed as a demonstrator of anatomy at Trinity College in 1911. In 1912, he was inducted to the Royal College of Surgeons in Ireland as a fellow. In the same year he was selected for overseas research fellowship of Trinity College but gave to his nearest candidate who he thought was more in need. Instead, he went to St Mary's Hospital, London to train on bacteriology. In 1913, he was again selected for research fellowship with which he went to the Rockefeller Institute in New York, US, and worked there for eight months. He returned home to become assistant to Alexander Charles O'Sullivan (1858–1924), professor of pathology at Trinity College, and part-time assistant physician at the Royal City of Dublin Hospital.

As the World War I broke out in 1914, Stokes volunteered to serve in the army and was appointed Lieutenant in the Royal Army Medical Corps on 11 August 1914. Posted in France, he took with him his motorcycle using it as a mobile clinic for wounded soldiers in the battle field. Later, he used a friend's caravan for better equipment with which he served in the army till his demobilisation. He was promoted to Captain with which he was discharged in 1919. Before his official discharge, he was appointed professor of bacteriology and preventative medicine at Trinity College in 1919, the position created for him. He was simultaneously assigned as assistant physician to the Royal City of Dublin Hospital and Adelaide Hospital.

In 1920, the Rockefeller Foundation appointed him as member of an international research programme, the Yellow Fever Commission in West Africa. Returning from Africa in 1922, he became Sir William Dunn Professor of Pathology at the University of London and was attached to Guy's Hospital. In 1927, he joined the next Rockefeller Yellow Fever Commission.

== Contributions ==
=== World War I and infection epidemics ===
On the day, 4 August 1914, Britain declared war against Germany, Stokes volunteered in the British Army. After a week of training and designation as Lieutenant in the Royal Army Medical Corps on 11 August 1914, he went to France "bringing along his own motorcycle—which he had had the wisdom to bring with him on proceeding to France," as Colonel Stevenson Lyle Cummins later reminisced. His motorcycle and later a friend's caravan were named No. 1 Mobile Bacteriological Laboratory. From 1 July 1915, he was stationed at the British-Canadian field hospital in Remy, northern France, but moved about in several places in Belgium during his service.

From late 1914, there was an outbreak of a type of enteric fever among the Belgians in Flanders, where British soldiers were advancing and occupying most of the region. As the disease spread to Bristish soldiers, Stokes was charged with the investigation. He discovered that the disease could be easily curbed by hygienic habits. In March 1916, he reported his findings in The Lancet identifying the disease as a type of typhoid. His meticulous research, written in a personal letter to Cummins, was published in the British Medical Journal a year later.

One critical medical practice was the use of gas mask for oxygen given to the terminally wounded soldiers. Many soldiers died of an infection called gas gangrene when they were given oxygen life support. In 1916, Stokes was able to identify and isolate the causative bacterium, later called Clostridium. He also discovered that the bacterium developed in the gas masks due to ineffective flow of air. Developed by John Scott Haldane, the gas mask used at the time was tighly fitted on the face, and the use after a while promoted bacterial growth. In August 1916, Stokes developed a simpler oxygen delivery tubes that can be loosely inserted in the nose, now called nasal cannula, which became universally used in all medical oxygen delivery.

In the spring of 1916, an epidemic jaundice broke out among the British and French soldiers. Which they called the "trench disease" became a serious concern as hundreds of soldiers were affected, The medical officers could not identify the source and nature of the disease, as they reported in the British Medical Journal and The Lancet:

[From] the mass of obscure cases of fever one type has been isolated in which the clinical symptoms, the course, and to a certain extent the pathology, have been established, We are, however, still ignorant both of the nature of the infection and of the way in which it is introduced into the human system.

Stokes took care of a soldier with the fatal disease, and from the autopsy samples, identified the causative agent as a spirochaete bacterium, Spirochaeta icterohaemorrhagiae. The disease was first described by physician Adolf Weil in 1886 in Germany, and was therefore known in medicine as Weil's disease. The bacterium was discovered and named by Japanese physicians Ryokichi Inada and Yutaka Ido with their colleagues from the First Medical Clinic of the Imperial University at Kyushu, Fukuoka, in 1915. Stokes was aware of the scientific history and the disease prevalence in various parts of the world which helped him in the correct identification of the disease and the pathogen. The bacterium was later renamed Leptospira interrogans, and with it the disease, leptospirosis.

With his senior medical officer, Captain John A. Ryle, Stokes reported his findings in the British Medical Journal and the BMJ Military Health in September 1916, with additional notes in The Lancet in January 1917.

However, the source of infection was still a mystery. In 1914, Inada and Ido had shown that the infection could be induced in guinea pigs by inoculating with an infected person's blood. Based on this information, Stokes suspected that rodents might be the carriers of the bacterium. In 1917, he found rats from the war trenches having the bacterium in their blood. He noted: "The rat dissecting was not all a bouquet of flowers, for the weather had become very hot and many of the corpses were far from fresh." In the 1917 The Lancet report, Stokes appended his findings as an "after-note", stating:

Of rats taken from the right part of Segment in the chart in the paper, proved infective to guinea-pigs. Of rats from the left end of Segment one communicated the disease. The kidney of the rat was crushed and emulsified, and injected intra-peritoneally into the guinea-pig. The disease in the infected animal was typical, and we have found the typical S. icterohaemorrhagica in the organs of the guinea-pig.

The discovery of field rats as the disease carrier led to eradication of rats and the disease within a year. For his works, Stokes was honoured by King Albert I with Knight of the Belgian Order of the Crown in 1918.

=== Yellow Fever Commission ===
The yellow fever, or haemorrhagic fever, is one of the deadliest infections in humans. Severe outbreaks in North and South America in the 19th century prompted the US government to organise the United States Army Yellow Fever Commission. With discoveries of the mode of transmission, by mosquitos (scientific name Stegomyia fasciata, later renamed Aedes egypti), and the causative agent in 1901, yellow fever became the first disease known to be caused by a virus. Mosquito control programmes led to suppression of the outbreaks within two years in Brazil. Inspired by these achievements, the Rockefeller Foundation organised several Yellow Fever Commissions in South America and Mexico in the 1920s. However, the nature of the virus was still unknown.

In 1913 and 1914, there was an outbreak of yellow fever in Nigeria. In 1920, the Rockefeller Foundation invited Stokes to help in its West Africa Yellow Fever Commission. The commission investigated several regions but found the disease as rare occurrence, not a single case was seen. The only suspected case Stokes noticed was a man in Lagos, who ran away into the jungle afraid of medical examinations.

In 1925, reports of epidemic fever came from Nigeria. To investigate the disease, the Rockefeller Foundation through its International Health Board sent another commission. Led by Henry Beeuwkes of the Johns Hopkins School of Medicine, the commission team arrived in Lagos in June 1925. Working for 20 months, the commission made little progress and remained indecisive to the nature of the disease. It was not clear from their reports whether it was yellow fever or other diseases. They found that the infection was transmitted by a mosquito, but a species different from that in South America.

Adding to the confusion, one of the members, Hideyo Noguchi of the Rockefeller Institute, who specialised in leptopsirosis, insisted that it was a leptospiral infection. Noguchi's claim was based on an evidence he had discovered. In 1918, as part of the Yellow Fever Commission in Ecuador, he identified a bacterium which he called Leptospira icteroides from individuals with yellow fever. He demonstrated that infected blood sample inoculated in guinea pigs produced the disease. It was announced as "the discovery of the aetiological agent of yellow fever."

However, it was later realised that leptospirosis and yellow fever were prevalent together in Ecuador, that Noguchi's discovery could be a case of Weil's disease. The commission was far from achieving its specific task: "to attempt the isolation of the organism which causes the disease." The researchers used rhesus macaques from India, Brazilian marmosets, and chimpanzees to experiment on leptospiral infection, but in vain. To help resolve the issues, Beeuwkes invited Stokes to join the commission in April 1927. Stoke then applied for a six-month leave from Guy's Hospital, set out in May and started working in Lagos from Juney 1927. His enthusiasm and expertise was admired by other physicians, as N. Paul Hudson, described, "It was apparent that his interest in bringing all possible evidence against the relation of leptospire [sic] to yellow fever approached missionary zeal in its intensity."

On 30 June 1927, Stokes obtained blood samples from a 28-year-old man named Asibi and a 30-year-old woman named Felice, both of whom died of the disease a day before. The blood sample was injected into rhesus monkeys, guinea pigs and marmosets. The guinea pigs and marmosets remained healthy but the monkey (designated 253-A) developed the disease and died. Johannes H. Bauer performed experimental transmission on monkeys using mosquitos experiments; while Stokes and Hudson took turn examining the dead monkeys. Stokes used found out that Asibi's blood sample was extremely deadly, instantly killing all experimental monkeys and was not suitable for further experimentations; while Felice's sample was less virulent and was used in most of the experiments. By early August, he was able to demonstrate that the disease could be transmitted in monkeys by injecting infected blood samples or biting of infected mosquitos. After repeated experiments, he was able to conclude that it was not a case of leptospirosis since no bacteria were present in any of the human blood or mosquito or monkey blood. To him, an invisible (using microscope) agent must be a virus.

In his last letter dated 26 August, he reported a near conclusion to his investigation as a "very nearly certain" discovery of the virus that caused yellow fever. He ended the account as:

I have again ventured in cutting mosquitos, and it is in furiating to know that one has the virus under one's eye and cannot see it. I am cutting them in series—a normal one fed five days and two fed twenty-six and forty-two days. You get them all parallel and cut them from before backwards in series and then gaze in rapt admiration at nothing at all to see. They have lovely eyes though and lots of other nice tilings to distract you.

==== Infection and death ====
On 15 September 1927, Stokes had severe fever and was taken to the European Hospital. He developed symptoms of yellow fever indicating an accidental infection during the autopsies of infected and dead monkeys. Knowing he contracted the disease, he requested Beeuwkes to allow human experimentation. Earlier, Stokes had requested medical authorities for including volunteers for human experimentations, but the U.S. Army Board objected to it due to the hazardous nature of the infection. Stokes' blood samples were injected into monkeys, and he was also allowed to be bitten by mosquitos. The mosquitos were then let to feed on healthy monkeys. All the infected monkeys died, an ultimate proof of Koch's postulates.

On 18 August, Hudson and E.J. Scannell visited Stokes. Scannell had been an associate of Noguchi in the expedition to South America and staunch advocate, as Hudson put it, "Noguchi's protagonist", on the leptospiral origin of the infection in Africa. Stokes calmly asked Scannell to examine his symptoms and then with a string of questions, ending with, "Are you ready now to agree, to admit that yellow fever is caused by a virus and not by leptospira?" Scannell firmly answered, "I believe you fellows are right."

Stokes died before he saw the results of his last experiment. He was interred at the Ikogi cemetery in Lagos, Nigeria, on 20 August. He had no family of his own. The New York Times described him as "another martyr of science." The British Medical Journal in its obituary remarked him:

All who came into contact with him agree that no man did more to improve the lot of the sick and wounded than this young Irish officer, who was only 27 at the outbreak of war. He was directly responsible for the saving of countless lives.

==== Posthumous conclusion and outcome ====
Bauer and Hudson compiled Stokes's data, repeated the experiment to make definitive conclusion, and submitted a preliminary report in the Journal of the American Medical Association (published on 28 January 1928) and the detailed report to the American Journal of Tropical Medicine and Hygiene on 25 January 1928, and the publication in March was the announcement of the discovery of yellow fever virus. Bauer and Hudson wrote a preface note fully crediting Stokes as the lead scientist and senior author:

The experiments reported here were either completed or under way at the time of Dr. Stokes' death. Some of them were repeated later and the previous results confirmed. The work was carried out jointly by the authors, and questions concerning the publication of the results were often discussed. This report was not written until after the death of the senior author, but we believe that the conclusions derived from the data are in harmony with his opinions.

It was Bauer, with whom Stokes has several disagreement on the experiment, who insisted that Stokes be the lead author, saying, "It's the least we can do; he paid for it." He and Hudson were able to make conclusions that the disease was yellow fever as they identified the virus and its effects, and used Stokes as the human experimentation, stating:

- The disease could be transmitted from infected rhesus monkey to a healthy one.
- It was easily transmitted between monkeys and humans by injection of infected blood or biting with infected mosquitos, specifically Aedes aegypti.
- When in the circulating blood of monkeys, but not in mosquitos, the virus passed through Berkefeld filters of V and N grades, and also through Seitz asbestos filters, but it was not filterable through Berkefeld W filters – an evidence that the pathogen was a virus.

Stokes' experiment also indicated the possibility of developing a vaccine. In his last letter, he had analogically mentioned:

We are a bit full of ourselves as we have the fish hooked all right, right down in the belly, and unless we are careless and break the tackle it will only be a question of time. The time may be years, but it must come. He rose to a grey monkey in May and we hooked him fair early in July, and now we can transfer it by blood or mosquitos at will and can protect the animals by convalescent serum and so on.

Bauer and Hudson described the results of the main experiment: "Convalescent serum from a severe case of yellow fever in doses of 0.1 cc., protects monkeys against infection with this virus, while 2 cc. of normal human serum fails to give any protection."

The yellow fever virus was independently experimented in Brazil during 1929-1930 using different monkeys and mosquitos. In 1932, Max Theiler and Eugen Haagen at the Rockefeller Institute were able to culture the Asibi's blood sample (then known as Asibi virus). After continuous culture for five years, they developed a vaccine which Theiler named 17D. For the development of vaccine, Theiler received the Nobel Prize in Physiology or Medicine in 1951, the first and only Nobel Prize related to virus vaccine.

== Awards and honours ==
- Stokes was elected fellow of the Royal College of Surgeons in Ireland in 1912.
- He was awarded Distinguished Service Order (DSO) in 1918.
- He was made Knight of the Belgian Order of the Crown in 1918.
- He was awarded Order of the British Empire (OBE) in 1919.
- He was elected member of the Royal College of Physicians in London in 1924.
