= William Stokes =

William Stokes may refer to:

== Politicians ==
- William Stokes (MP), member of parliament for Leominster (UK Parliament constituency) in 1421
- William B. Stokes (1814–1897), American soldier and politician
- J. William Stokes (1853–1901), U.S. representative from South Carolina
- William R. Stokes, American politician and mayor of Augusta, Maine

== Doctors ==
- William Stokes (physician) (1804–1878), Irish physician
- Sir William Stokes (surgeon) (1839–1900), his son
- William Royal Stokes (1870–1930), American physician and bacteriologist

== Others ==
- William Axton Stokes (1814–1877), Philadelphia attorney and major in the American Civil War
- William Earl Dodge Stokes (1852–1926), American property developer
- William Stokes (Victoria cricketer) (1857–1929), Australian cricketer
- William Stokes (Western Australia cricketer) (1886–1954), Australian cricketer
- William Lee Stokes (1915-1994, known as the "Father of Utah geology"), American geologist and paleontologist
- William H. Stokes (born 1957), American bishop
- William James Stokes, musician better known by stage name Sir The Baptist

== See also ==
- Willie Stokes (disambiguation)
