= David Stokes =

David Stokes may refer to:

- David Stokes (soccer) (born 1982), American soccer player
- David Stokes (Guatemalan footballer) (1946–2025)
- David Stokes (English footballer) (1880–?)
- David Stokes (priest) (died 1669), Canon of Windsor
- Norm Stokes (David Norman Stokes, 1909–2004), New Zealand cricketer
