= Camp Thomas =

American Civil War training camp

Coordinates: 40.067°N 83.0323°W

Camp Thomas was a United States Regular Army training facility located in North Columbus, Ohio (now Columbus), during the American Civil War. It was primarily used to organize and train new infantry regiments for service in the Western Theater.

== Establishment ==
With the outbreak of the Civil War and the bombardment of Fort Sumter in South Carolina, President Abraham Lincoln called for 100,000 volunteers to put down the growing rebellion. Colonel Henry B. Carrington had been commissioned to raise troops for the expanded United States Army in Ohio, Indiana, and Pennsylvania. In July 1861, he established a training camp on the Solomon Beers farm along the Delaware Road, four miles north of the city of Columbus. He named the new facility "Camp Thomas" in honor of Colonel Lorenzo Thomas, the Adjutant General of the U.S. Army. Camp Thomas augmented the nearby Camp Chase, a similar military camp established for the state's regiments raised for the volunteer Union Army. The camp was located on property owned by Soloman Beers, on the east side of High Street, south of Hudson

Temporary structures were erected for the new camp's headquarters, as well as the guard room and hospital. Streets were lined out and tents erected as shelters for the incoming new recruits, who began arriving in mid-August. Among the prominent officers at Camp Thomas during the war was Captain William J. Fetterman, who arrived five days after Carrington opened the camp. He would later be killed and his troops massacred by Sioux Indians. Major William Axton Stokes, later a leading Philadelphia attorney, for a period commanded Camp Thomas.

== 18th U.S. Infantry ==
For most of the war, Camp Thomas served as the headquarters for the 18th U.S. Infantry, with the roster of the First Battalion being filled by Colonel Carrington and his recruiters in early September. Later in the month, Carrington organized the Second Battalion of six additional companies. In October, General-in-Chief Winfield Scott arrived in Columbus to tour the camp and review the new regiment. The 18th Infantry drilled at the camp for several weeks before moving to the front lines in Kentucky. A similar camp was authorized by Scott at Perryville, Maryland, to train regiments for duty in the Eastern Theater.

On 3 November 1861, a battalion of the 16th U.S. Infantry under Major Sidney Coolidge arrived at Camp Thomas after its home base, Camp Slemmer in Chicago, Illinois, was closed. Additional recruits arrived and, by the end of the month, two additional companies had been raised to join the four from Illinois.

The camp remained active throughout the war as headquarters for the 18th U.S. Infantry, and served as a training base for fresh recruits needed to refill the ranks after significant combat losses at battles such as Stones River. (The 16th U.S. Infantry moved its base to Fort Ontario in New York.) For most of the war, Camp Thomas was under the jurisdiction of Brig. Gen. John S. Mason. A few volunteer regiments and artillery batteries, such as the 22nd Ohio Battery, also trained at Camp Thomas for various periods.

Frequent attempts were made to convince the Army to erect more permanent structures than tents and the three canvas-roofed timber buildings, but these were denied. Columbus officials hoped that brick or stone buildings would prove more lasting (and keep the base open after the war); they also wanted a military cemetery established for the dead of the 18th U.S. Infantry. Nothing came of the plans.

Following the Civil War, the camp was decommissioned. By order of the Secretary of War, Camp Thomas was discontinued as a recruiting depot for the Regular Army early in October 1866. Buildings erected for the camp were sold, with some converted to houses in the vicinity of the camp. By 1900 most traces of the camp were essentially gone. The final known (and documented) wooden structure from the camp (that had been used as a barber shop well into the late 20th Century) was razed in the early 1990s.
