= Sinaia Agreement =

1938 treaty between Romania, France and the United Kingdom

- Signed: 18 August 1938
- Location: Sinaia, Romania
- Effective: 13 May 1939
- Signatories: France; United Kingdom; Romania
- Depositary: Romanian Government
- Languages: English, French, Romanian

The Sinaia Agreement was concluded on 18 August 1938 between Romania, France and the United Kingdom. It entered into force on 13 May 1939.

The agreement provided for most of the powers of the European Danube Commission, including the control of the Danube maritime navigation from Brăila to the Black Sea, to be transferred to the Romanian state. All of the ships of the Commission became the Romanian state's property.

On 16 May 1939, three days after the treaty went into effect and ended the Commission's authority over the Lower Danube, the Commission's flag was hauled down at Sulina and the Romanian flag was hoisted in its place. On 25 May, the Romanian flag was hoisted aboard a vessel of the Commission, marking the end of a system which had lasted for 82 years, since 1856. The Commission continued to nominally exist, but only as a counselor.
