= John Stokes (Irish mathematician) =

Irish mathematician (1720–1781)

John Stokes (1720 – 2 November 1781) was a Dublin-born academic who served (1762–1764) as the first Erasmus Smith's Professor of Mathematics at Trinity College Dublin (TCD). He was the son of engineer Gabriel Stokes (1682–1768), who in 1746 became deputy surveyor general of Ireland, and Elizabeth King (1689–1751). John's brother Gabriel (1731–1806) was also a mathematician at TCD.

John Stokes received a BA (1740) and MA (1743) from TCD, became a fellow there in 1746, and then obtained a BD (1752) and DD (1755). During 1760–1762, he was Donegall Lecturer of Mathematics, and after his term as Erasmus Smith's Professor of Mathematics, he was appointed Regius Professor of Greek in 1764. In 1777, he became Rector of Rahy and Clondahorky, Donegal.

John was a member of the prominent Anglo-Irish Stokes family, whose notable members include Sir George Stokes, 1st baronet (great grandson), Whitley Stokes (physician) (nephew), William Stokes (physician) (grand nephew), Sir William Stokes (great grand nephew), Whitley Stokes (Celtic scholar) (great grand nephew), Margaret Stokes (great grand niece), Sir Henry Edward Stokes (great grand nephew), Sir Gabriel Stokes (great great grand nephew), and Charles Stokes (trader) (great great grand nephew). Australian chemist and Foundation Professor of Chemistry at the University of New England, Robin Stokes, is a distant relative.
