= Senator Stokes (disambiguation) =

Montfort Stokes (1762–1842) was a U.S. Senator from North Carolina from 1816 to 1823. Senator Stokes may also refer to:

- Connie Stokes (born 1953), Georgia State Senate
- Edward C. Stokes (1860–1942), New Jersey State Senate
- John Stokes (North Carolina judge) (1756–1790), North Carolina State Senate
- Walter W. Stokes (1880–1960), New York State Senate
- William B. Stokes (1814–1897), Tennessee State Senate

== See also ==
- Stokes (surname)
- Stokes (disambiguation)
