= Stokes Township =

Stokes Township may refer to:

- Stokes Township, Itasca County, Minnesota
- Stokes Township, Roseau County, Minnesota
- Stokes Township, Logan County, Ohio
- Stokes Township, Madison County, Ohio

== See also ==
- Stokes (disambiguation)
