= Robert Stokes =

Robert Stokes may refer to:

- Robert Stokes (animator) (1908–1980), American animator
- Robert Stokes (politician) (1809–1880), member of the New Zealand Legislative Council
- Robert Stokes (MP), member of parliament for Huntingdonshire
- Robert Stokes Sr., Baltimore City Council member
- Rob Stokes (born 1975), Australian politician
- Bob Stokes (meteorologist) (born 1958), American meteorologist
- Bob Stokes (American football) (1931–2019), American football and basketball player and coach
- Bobby Stokes (1951–1995), English footballer
- Robin Stokes (Robert Harold Stokes, 1918–2016), Australian chemist
