= Arthur Stokes =

Arthur Stokes may refer to:

- Arthur Stokes (footballer)
- Arthur Stokes (cyclist)
- Art Stokes, American baseball player
