= Adrian Stokes =

Adrian Stokes may refer to:

- Adrian Stokes (courtier) (1519–1586), English MP for Leicestershire
- Adrian Scott Stokes (1854–1935), British painter
- Adrian Stokes (critic) (1902–1972), British art critic
- Adrian V. Stokes (1945–2020), Internet pioneer
- Adrian Stokes (physician) (1887–1927), Irish physician and microbiologist
