= Richard Stokes =

Richard or Dick Stokes may refer to:

- Richard Stokes (politician), British soldier and politician
- Richard Stokes (producer), British television producer
- Richard Stokes (priest), English Anglican priest
- Dick Stokes (hurler), Irish hurler
- Dick Stokes (footballer), Australian rules footballer

== See also ==
- Ricky Stokes, American athletics administrator and college basketball coach
