= Dick Stokes (footballer) =

Australian rules footballer

Personal information
- Full name: Richard Bernard Stokes
- Born: 21 September 1890; Geelong, Victoria
- Died: 8 December 1960 (aged 70); Geelong, Victoria
- Original team: Chilwell

Playing career^{1}
| Years | Club | Games (Goals) |
| 1915, 1917 | Geelong | 12 (1) |
- ^{1} Playing statistics correct to the end of 1917.

Richard Bernard Stokes (21 September 1890 – 8 December 1960) was an Australian rules footballer who played with Geelong in the Victorian Football League (VFL).

== Family ==
The son of Michael Patrick Stokes (1856–1928), and Bridget Agnes Stokes (1855–1940), née Daffey, Richard Bernard Stokes was born at Waurn Ponds, Geelong on 21 September 1890.

He married Catherine Winifred Ryan (1890–1936) in 1917.

== Football ==
Along with Cliff Rankin, Stokes was recruited from the Chilwell Football Club, in the local Geelong and District Football Association (GDFA) in 1915. He and Vin Maguire played their first senior game for Geelong against Richmond, at the Corio Oval, on 15 May 1915.

He played in 9 senior matches in 1915. Geelong did not compete in the VFL in 1916, due to wartime considerations. Along with South Melbourne, Geelong re-entered the VFL competition in 1917. Stokes played in three more senior games, his last against Fitzroy, at Brunswick Street, on 23 June 1917.
