= Frank Lusk Babbott =

American jute merchant, art collector, patron, and philanthropist

- Born: Frank Lusk Babbott; August 14, 1854; Waterville, New York, US
- Died: December 7, 1933 (aged 79); New York City, US
- Occupations: Jute merchant, art collector, patron, and philanthropist
- Known for: Babbott Field and Babbott Avenue, both in Waterville, New York, named in his honor

Frank Lusk Babbott (August 14, 1854 – December 7, 1933) was an American jute merchant, art collector, patron, and philanthropist.

== Early life ==
Babbott was born in Waterville, New York on August 14, 1854, the son of Miller Babbott and Mary Elizabeth Crandall.

He was a childhood friend of George Eastman, founder of Eastman Kodak.

== Education ==
He was educated at Amherst College, graduating in the class of 1878. He then studied at Columbia University, graduating with an LLB in 1880.

== Career ==
Babbott was Director of Chelsea Jute Mills from 1883 to 1901. He was a member of the Brooklyn Board of Education, and president of the Brooklyn Free Kindergarten Society.

He was a trustee of various organisations:

- Packer Collegiate Institute, Brooklyn, president Board of Trustees, 1911–1933
- Vassar College (1915–1922)
- YWCA of Brooklyn
- Brooklyn Academy of Music
- Brooklyn Public Library
- Brooklyn Institute of Arts and Sciences, now Brooklyn Museum

He was vice-president of the New York Board of Education, 1902–1904.

Babbott died on December 7, 1933, at his home at 149 Lincoln Place, Brooklyn.

== Personal life ==
Babbott's family home was 153 Lincoln Place, Brooklyn, New York. They also owned an estate at Glen Cove, Long Island, advertised for sale in 2008 at $4.2 million.

Babbott married Lydia Richardson Pratt (1857–1904), daughter of Standard Oil magnate Charles Pratt on February 18, 1886.

They had four children:

- Mary Babbott, who married Dr William Sargeant Ladd
- Frank Lusk Babbott Jr (1891–1970) (Amherst 1913)
- Lydia Pratt Babbott, who married Dr. S. Emlen Stokes
- Helen L Babbott, who married Mr. Ian McDonald

== Honours ==
- Chevalier of the Legion of Honour
- Commanders of the Order of the Dannebrog

== Legacy ==
A public park (Babbott Field) and a street (Babbott Avenue), both in Waterville, New York, were named in his honor. The Babbott Room in the Octagon at Amherst College was named in memory of him.

He left a bequest of over $540,000 to Vassar College to establish the Lydia Richardson Babbott Endowment.

The Frank L. Babbott Chair of Literature & The Arts at Packer Collegiate Institute is named in his honor, established by his family in 1977.
