= Jack Stokes =

Jack Stokes may refer to:

- Jack Stokes (politician) (1923–2000), Canadian politician
- Jack Stokes (director) (1920–2013), animation director

== See also ==
- John Stokes (disambiguation)
