= John Stoke =

John Stoke may refer to:

- John Stoke (doctor) (1928–2000), New Zealand physician
- John Stoke (MP) (died 1383), English politician, Mayor of Bristol
- John Stoke (died 1370), vicar commemorated at St. Mary's Church, Hadlow
- John Stoke (died 1451), Abbot of St Albans
- John Stoke, 1446 MP for Wallingford, see Wallingford

== See also ==
- John Stokes (disambiguation)
