= Edward Stokes =

Edward Stokes may refer to:

- Edward C. Stokes (1860–1942), 32nd Governor of New Jersey, USA
- Edward L. Stokes (1880–1964), U.S. Representative from Pennsylvania
- Edward Stiles Stokes (1841–1901), business partner and murderer of financier James Fisk
- Ed Stokes (Edward Kobie Stokes, born 1971), American basketball player

== See also ==
- J. Ed Stokes (1888–1964), American politician
