= Bob Stokes (American football) =

American football player, coach, and administrator (1931–2019)

Biographical details
- Born: June 8, 1931; Frazeysburg, Ohio, U.S.
- Died: July 5, 2019 (aged 88); Ashland, Ohio, U.S.

Playing career

Football
- 1949–1952: Muskingum
- 1953: Chicago Cardinals

Basketball
- 1949–1953: Muskingum

Coaching career (HC unless noted)

Football
- 1955–1957: Muskingum (assistant)
- 1958–1964: Ashland (assistant)
- 1965–1966: Muskingum (assistant)
- 1967–1969: Muskingum

Basketball
- 1958–1965: Ashland
- 1965–1967: Muskingum

Administrative career (AD unless noted)
- 1970–1975: Ashland

Head coaching record
- Overall: 19–5–3 (football); 99–92 (basketball)

Robert S. Stokes (June 8, 1931 – July 5, 2019) was an American football player, coach of football and basketball, and college athletics administrator. He served as the head football coach at Muskingum College from 1967 to 1969, compiling a record of 19–5–3. Stokes was also the head basketball coach at Ashland University from 1958 to 1965 and Muskingum from 1965 to 1967, amassing a career college basketball coaching mark of 99–92.

== Head coaching record ==
=== Football ===
Year	Team	Overall	Conference	Standing	Bowl/playoffs
Muskingum Fighting Muskies (Ohio Athletic Conference) (1967–1969)
1967	Muskingum	8–1	5–1	T–2nd	
1968	Muskingum	6–2–1	5–2	T–4th	
1969	Muskingum	5–2–2	3–1–2	T–4th	
Muskingum:		19–5–3	13–4–2		
Total:		19–5–3			
