= Willie Stokes (disambiguation) =

Willie Stokes was a Chicago drug kingpin.

Willie Stokes may also refer to:

- Willie Stokes (caddie), golf caddie and 2006 Caddie Hall of Fame inductee
- Willie "the Wimp" Stokes Jr., Willie Stokes' murdered son immortalized in the Stevie Ray Vaughan song, "Willie the Wimp"
- Willie T. Stokes, fictional character played by Billy Bob Thornton in the move Bad Santa

== See also ==
- William Stokes (disambiguation)
