= Colin Stokes =

American cellist (born 1987)

Colin Stokes (born October 7, 1987) is an American-born cellist, pursuing an active performing career in the United States and Europe.

== Biography ==
Colin Stokes was born in Gettysburg, Pennsylvania, to parents Lisa Portmess and Harry Stokes. His mother is a professor of philosophy at Gettysburg College and his father is the president of Gaia, Inc.

At age 6 Colin began studying piano and one year later started lessons on the cello. He studied locally until age 11 when he started commuting to Baltimore, Maryland, to study with Troy Stuart, with whom he stayed until his graduation from Baltimore School for the Arts in 2006. While in high school, Colin was chosen to play with Yo-Yo Ma in Heitor Villa-Lobos' Bachianas Brasilieras No. 5 at the Meyerhoff Symphony Hall in Baltimore, Maryland, and the Strathmore Performing Arts Center outside of Washington, D.C. His performance was described during this concert as "beautifully executed, but more moving emotionally" particularly his performance of Villa-Lobos's Bachianas Brasileiras No. 5." Upon graduation from Baltimore School for the Arts, Colin was given the Joan G. and Joseph Klein, Jr. Prize for the Most Promising Performing Artist.

Colin studied with Steven Doane and Rosemary Elliott at the Eastman School of Music in Rochester, NY. He plays on a cello made by Carl Becker in 1933.

Colin has spent summers at Norfolk Chamber Music Festival, Sarasota Music Festival and the Heifetz Institute. He has been invited to perform on series such as Baltimore's 2nd Presbyterian Chamber Series, Norfolk's Master Artist Series and Heifetz’ Celebrity Artist Series. He has collaborated with some of the great artists of today including Ani Kavafian, Yo-Yo Ma, James Taylor and Yuri Temirkanov. Colin Stokes has premiered works by composers Joungbum Lee, Jen Bellor, Robert Pierzak, Matt Barber and Michael Myounghoon Lee. He has also worked closely with composers Ricardo Zohn-Muldoon, Mohammed Fairouz and John Williams on their own music. Stokes is also member of the electro-classical project SYMPHONIACS.
