= Frank Stokes =

Frank Stokes may refer to:

- Frank Stokes (musician) (1888–1955), American blues musician, songster, and blackface minstrel
- Frank Stokes (footballer) (1881–1945), English professional footballer
- Frank Stokes (rugby league) (born 1972), Australian rugby league player
- Frank Wilbert Stokes (1858–1955), American sketch artist and painter

== See also ==
- Francis Stokes, American screenwriter and film director
