= Lydia B. Stokes =

American philanthropist

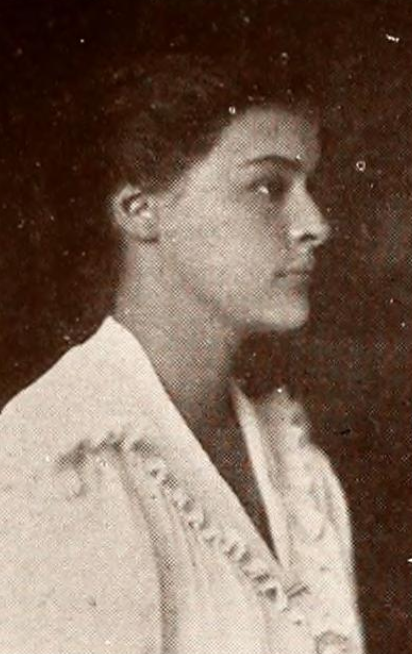
- Lydia Pratt Babbott (later Stokes), from the 1917 yearbook of Vassar College
- Born: Lydia Pratt Babbott; June 3, 1895; Glen Cove, New York, U.S.
- Died: July 14, 1988 (aged 93); Medford, New Jersey, U.S.
- Father: Frank Lusk Babbott
- Relatives: Charles Pratt (grandfather); Charles Millard Pratt (uncle)

Lydia Pratt Babbott Stokes (June 3, 1895 – July 14, 1988) was an American philanthropist based in Moorestown, New Jersey. The Lydia B. Stokes Foundation, which she founded in 1959, is a nonprofit organization supporting environmental, peace, and nutrition projects.

== Early life and education ==
Lydia Pratt Babbott was born in Glen Cove, New York, the daughter of Frank Lusk Babbott and Lydia Richardson Pratt Babbott. Her mother's family was prominent in the petroleum industry, including her maternal grandfather, Charles Pratt and her uncle, Charles Millard Pratt. Her family founded Pratt Institute. Her father was a businessman active in the arts and educational institutions.

Babbott attended Packer Collegiate Institute while her father was the president of the school, and graduated from Vassar College in 1917; her mother and both of her sisters also attended Vassar.

== Clubwork and philanthropy ==
Stokes was active in women's clubwork in Moorestown, New Jersey. She won awards in the Moorestown Women's Club flower shows, and was founder and president of the township's Visiting Nurse Association. She held the women's golf championship at Moorestown Field Club in the 1930s. In her late years she was involved in Church Women United and a delegate to the World Council of Churches.

In 1922, Stokes donated a residential annex, large enough to accommodate 100 guests, to the Brooklyn YWCA. She and her siblings created a student aid fund at Amherst College as a memorial to their mother in 1925. In 1959 she founded the Lydia B. Stokes Foundation, to support women's health, peace, and environmental conservation projects. Stokes was a major supporter of the Moorestown Friends School, providing scholarships and building funds; in 1986, she performed the ceremonial groundbreaking for a new hall at the school. She also donated a Philadelphia clinic to Planned Parenthood, a dormitory to Goddard College, a laboratory to Haverford College, and a small hospital to Mount Holly. "I guess you can't take it with you, so you might as well share it," she told an interviewer in 1986. "It's more fun to give it away now."

Stokes was named "Philanthropist of the Year" by the National Society of Fundraising Executives in 1986.

== Personal life ==
Babbott married Quaker pediatrician and New Jersey legislator Samuel Emlen Stokes in 1920. They had children Samuel, Lydia, Sarah, and Ann, born between 1922 and 1931; all four graduated from Moorestown Friends School. Her husband died in 1972. She sold their home in Moorestown, Broadacres Mansion, in 1979, and moved into a smaller residence after her husband's death. She died in 1988, at the age of 93, in Medford, New Jersey. The Lydia B. Stokes Foundation still exists as of 2025, funding community farms and food assistance programs.
