= William Axton Stokes =

American lawyer

Major William Axton Stokes
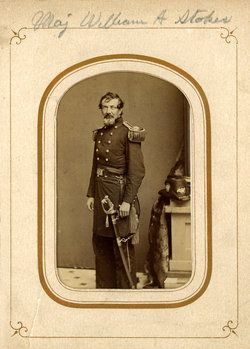
- Stokes in a Civil-War era photo
- Born: 1814; Philadelphia, Pennsylvania, US
- Died: May 3, 1877 (aged 62–63); Philadelphia, Pennsylvania, US
- Burial place: Saint John the Evangelist Church Cemetery, Philadelphia, Pennsylvania
- Military career
- Allegiance: United States; Union
- Branch: US Army; Union Army
- Rank: Major
- Unit: 18th U.S. Infantry
- Conflicts: American Civil War
- Other work: Attorney, Pennsylvania Railroad Company

William Axton Stokes (1814 – May 3, 1877) was an attorney born in Philadelphia, Pennsylvania, who lived for a time in Greensburg, Pennsylvania, where he served as legal counsel for the Pennsylvania Railroad Company. He went on to serve as an American Civil War major who contributed notes and references to an American edition of Mathew Hale's Historia placitorum coronae (History of the pleas of the crown) published by R. H. Small of Philadelphia in 1847. Between January 1863 and August 1864, he owned The Republican, one of the first local newspapers in Greensburg, Pennsylvania. He was elected as a member of the American Philosophical Society in 1872.

== Stokes Mansion and Meeting with Andrew Carnegie ==
In 1850, at the age of 36, Stokes was persuaded by his legal client, the Pennsylvania Railroad Company, to take a residence in the southwestern portion of Pennsylvania. He took up residence in Greensburg, Pennsylvania, in Westmoreland County in a hilltop dwelling that would be known as Stokes Mansion. It sat on the property of the Jennings Farm which would later be purchased by the Sisters of Charity where they would charter their new school, now known as Seton Hill University.

It was during his time in Greensburg that Stokes read an article written by a young telegraph operator by the name of Andrew Carnegie on the subject of people's attitudes toward Stokes' client, the Pennsylvania Railroad Company. Stokes invited Carnegie to visit and spend the night at his mansion. In his autobiography, Carnegie writes of Stokes:

I had never spent a night in a strange house in my life until Mr. Stokes of Greensburg, chief counsel of the Pennsylvania Railroad, invited me to his beautiful home in the country to pass a Sunday. It was an odd thing for Mr. Stokes to do, for I could little interest a brilliant and educated man like him. The reason for my receiving such an honor was a communication I had written for the "Pittsburgh Journal."

It was the "grandeur" of Stokes' private library, the first private library Andrew Carnegie had ever seen, that partially inspired the public libraries Carnegie established in later years. Carnegie writes:

The grandeur of Mr. Stokes's home impressed me, but the one feature of it that eclipsed all else was a marble mantel in his library. In the center of the arch, carved in the marble, was an open book with this inscription:

"He that cannot reason is a fool, He that will not a bigot, He that dare not a slave."

These noble words thrilled me. I said to myself, "Some day, some day, I'll have a library" (that was a look ahead) "and these words shall grace the mantel as here." And so they do in New York and Skibo to-day.

After the purchase of the property by the Sisters of Charity, the mansion was used as a Mother House for the sisters. The mansion was later turned into Saint Mary's School for boys. The building still stands today on Seton Hill University's campus, though it has undergone many changes and uses, and is known as St. Mary Hall.

== Civil War service ==
Stokes later served as a major in the U.S. Infantry during the American Civil War, including a period in 1861 commanding at the 18th U.S. Infantry Headquarters, Camp Thomas, Franklin County, Ohio.

His stirring speech, at the Union Convention of Westmoreland County, PA in 1861, was delivered in support of the united American Republic and in favor of the war to crush rebellion. He denied the rebel cause by systematically positing that the rebel states have no right of secession, no grounds for revolution, and no justifiable argument against Abraham Lincoln's election to the presidency.

== After the war ==
In 1874, Stokes was part of a committee appointed to report upon the operations of the Pennsylvania Railroad Company.

The Special Collections at Villanova University contains some of Stokes's personal papers as well as other donations of the Stokes family to the university. A small collection of Stokes documents can also be found in the Special Collections Department at the University of Delaware Library.

== Personal life ==
Stokes was married twice, once to Mary Scanlan and later to Nancy Williams. He died on May 3, 1877, in Philadelphia.

== Inspiration in later times ==
In 2018, James Bosco, assistant professor of hospitality and tourism at Seton Hill University which sits on the land formerly owned by Stokes, opened a tapas restaurant in Greensburg bearing the name Major Stokes.
