= Frederick Stokes =

Frederick Stokes may refer to:

- Frederick Stokes (rugby union) (1850–1929), first captain of the England national rugby union team
- Sir Wilfred Stokes (1860–1927), inventor and civil engineer
- Frederick A. Stokes (1857–1939), American publisher

== See also ==
- Fred Stokes (born 1964), American football player
