= John Arthur Stokes =

American educator (born 1931)

John Arthur Stokes (born 31 December 1931) is an American educator who was a prominent figure in the civil rights movement.

Born in Kingsville, Virginia, Stokes grew up in the Jim Crow South and attended Robert Russa Moton High School, a segregated school for black students. Recognizing the inequalities he and his classmates faced, Stokes staged a walk out and refused to return to class until the school was rebuilt. Stokes documented these efforts in his memoir, co-written with Lois Wolfe, Students on Strike. He attended Virginia State University and became an educator in Baltimore.

== Awards ==
J A Stokes received following awards.

Award Received	References
The Dr. Charles Hamilton Houston Award	
The A. Leon Higginbotham Award	
United States Department of Justice Award	
N.E.A. Award	
