= Michael Stokes =

Michael Stokes may refer to:

- Michael Stokes (record producer) (born 1955), American record producer
- Michael Stokes (academic) (1933–2012), British professor of Greek
- Michael Stokes (photographer) (born 1963), American photographer
- Michael Stokes, software developer of Shareaza
