= Charles Stokes =

Charles Stokes may refer to:

- Charles Stokes (artist) (1944–2008), American painter and sculptor
- Charles Stokes (collector) (c. 1784–1853), English stockbroker, amateur scientist, and art collector
- Charles M. Stokes (1902–1996), American politician, jurist, and lawyer
- Charles Stokes (trader) (1852–1895), Irish missionary turned trader
- Charles F. Stokes (1863–1931), inventor of the Stokes Litter

== See also ==
- Charles Stokes House, New Jersey
