= Governor Stokes =

Governor Stokes may refer to:

- Edward C. Stokes (1860–1942), 32nd Governor of New Jersey
- Gabriel Stokes (1849–1920), Acting Governor of Madras in 1906
- Luke Stokes (fl. 1630s–1650s), Governor of Nevis from 1634 to 1635 and from 1649 to in 1656
- Montfort Stokes (1762–1842), 25th Governor of North Carolina
