= Barry Stokes =

Barry Stokes may refer to:

- Barry Stokes (American football) (born 1973), American football offensive lineman
- Barry Stokes (actor), British actor
