= Alexander Charles O'Sullivan =

Dr. Alexander Charles O'Sullivan
- Born: 1858; County Cork, Ireland
- Died: 18 February 1924; Ailesbury Road, Dublin, Ireland
- Education: Trinity College Dublin
- Occupation: Professor
- Years active: 1895–
- Organisation(s): Trinity College Dublin, Royal Army Medical Corps
- Known for: Pathology
- Military career
- Allegiance: United Kingdom
- Branch: British Army
- Service years: 1915–
- Rank: Lieutenant colonel
- Unit: Royal Army Medical Corps

Dr. Alexander Charles O'Sullivan (1858–18 February 1924), B.A., M.B., B.Ch., B.A.O was Professor of Pathology in the Trinity College Dublin and Senior Fellow of Trinity College Dublin. He was born in County Cork and educated at Trinity College, later becoming a lecturer and then professor at that institution. During World War I he served in Malta with the Royal Army Medical Corps. He was capped once for the Ireland national rugby union team.

== Early life and education ==
Dr. Alex O'Sullivan was born in County Cork in May 1858, the son of the Rev. Denis Mitchell O'Sullivan, Rector of Macroom, and Lucia Maria née Swete, as the oldest of four children. He was educated at Tipperary Grammar School and went to Trinity College Dublin. Having studied classics in his first years he suddenly turned to mathematics, and obtained a scholarship in that subject in 1879. In 1881 he was first senior moderator in mathematics and also in ethics and logic.

The British Medical Journal noted that the first mathematical scholar in 1879 was Dr. Bernard, later a Provost of Trinity College, and the senior classical scholar was Professor J. B. Bury, the distinguished historian; Dr. Bernard obtained his Fellowship in 1884, Dr. Bury in 1885, and Dr. O'Sullivan in 1886.

Having taken his Fellowship, Dr. O'Sullivan, under the influence and advice of Professor Samuel Haughton, turned to the study of medicine, and took his M.B., B.Ch., B.A.O. degrees in 1894. He also took a special course of bacteriology in Vienna.

== Later life and career ==
Returning to Dublin in 1895, Dr. O'Sullivan was appointed lecturer in pathology in Trinity College. When the chair of pathology was founded he was again reappointed as lecturer, and a couple of years later he was confirmed in that position as professor. Dr. O'Sullivan may be regarded as the father of the modern school of Dublin physicians.

Dr. O'Sullivan held examinerships in the Universities of Glasgow, Edinburgh, Manchester, and Belfast, and was a member of the Royal Irish Academy, for which he wrote many papers. During the last three years of his life he held the position of registrar of the medical school (dean of the medical faculty). He came into contact with two generations of medical students, and helped to shape the policy of the college. In 1903 he was vice-president of the Pathology Section at the meeting of the British Medical Association at Swansea.

== War record ==
In the autumn of 1915 Dr. O'Sullivan volunteered for service and went out as a major in the Royal Army Medical Corps to Malta, where his work in malaria and dysentery obtained widespread recognition. He was soon promoted to the rank of lieutenant colonel and became Director of Laboratories, Malta. At the close of World War I he was placed in charge of the Central Military Laboratory for Ireland.

== Death ==
Dr. O'Sullivan died on 18 February 1924 at his residence, Ailesbury Road, Dublin, after an illness of only a few days. The cause of his death was blood poisoning contracted on 13 February, whilst performing a post-mortem examination. He left a widow and four children.

== Character ==
In his youth he was an accomplished athlete, and he rowed in the college eights and fours. He was a keen yachtsman and golfer, and loved a game of billiards. The British Medical Journal's obituary described Dr. O'Sullivan as "a man of the most lovable character: with simplicity he combined manly courage, as had frequently been displayed in his mountaineering adventures."

Dr. O'Sullivan was a fine classical scholar, and always kept in close touch with the progress of modern mathematics; many men holding chairs in that subject to-day would acknowledge him to be their master. His interest in the development of mathematical research did not interfere with his devotion to philosophy and the classics, and he probably had few equals in his knowledge of cellular pathology. He was an inspiring teacher; his laboratory was a rallying point for medical students and newly qualified physicians in search of advice and guidance.
