= Patrick Stokes =

Patrick or Paddy Stokes may refer to:

- Patrick Stokes (businessman) (born 1942), American businessman
- Paddy Stokes (politician) (1884–1945), Australian politician
- Patrick Stokes (philosopher), Australian philosopher
- Paddy Stokes (footballer), English professional footballer
- Paddy Stokes (rugby union), Irish international rugby union player
