= Olivia Stokes =

Olivia Stokes may refer to:

- Olivia P. Stokes, American religious educator, Baptist minister, author, administrator, and civil rights activist
- Olivia Egleston Phelps Stokes, American writer and benefactor
- Olivia Stokes Hatch, née Stokes, American philanthropist, clubwoman, and travel writer
