= Gabriel Stokes =

Irish-born British colonial administrator (1849–1920)

Sir Gabriel Stokes KCSI
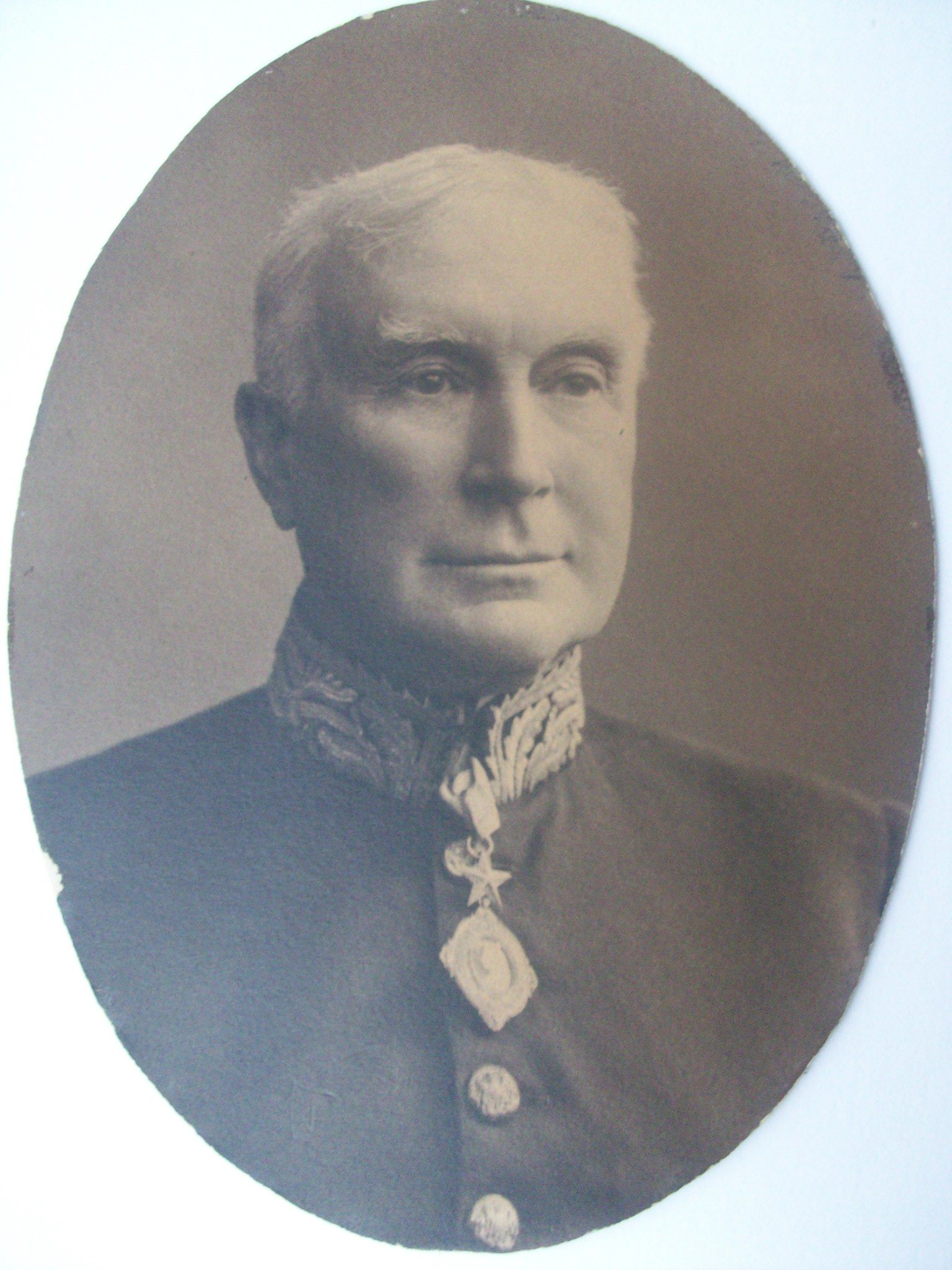

Governor of Madras (acting)
- In office 15 February 1906 – 28 March 1906
- Governor-General: Gilbert Elliot-Murray-Kynynmound, 4th Earl of Minto,
- Preceded by: Oliver Russell, 2nd Baron Ampthill
- Succeeded by: Arthur Lawley, 6th Baron Wenlock

Personal details
- Born: 7 July 1849 Ballyard, Tralee, County Kerry, Ireland
- Died: 22 October 1920 (aged 71) 72 Morehampton Road, Dublin, Ireland
- Spouse(s): Rebecca Horsfall (m. 1885; died 1886) May Florence Fuller (m. 1889; died 1897)
- Relations: Henry Stokes (brother)

Sir Gabriel Stokes KCSI (7 July 1849 – 22 October 1920) was an Irish civil servant and colonial administrator of the Indian Civil Service. He acted as the Governor of Madras between February–March 1906.

== Family ==
Gabriel Stokes was born on 7 July 1849 at Ballyard, Tralee, County Kerry, Ireland and was educated at Kilkenny College, Armagh and Trinity College, Dublin. The son of Henry Stokes, the county surveyor of Kerry, Stokes was born into a prominent family of academics which had been associated for Trinity College, Dublin for several generations. His grandfather was Whitley Stokes, a Regius Professor of Physic at Trinity College, Dublin, his great-grandfather Gabriel Stokes (1732–1806), a professor of mathematics at Trinity and his great-great-grandfather, also Gabriel Stokes, a Deputy Surveyor General of Ireland. His older brother Henry Stokes was also a prominent member of the Indian civil service. His great-granduncle was the mathematician John Stokes.

== Indian civil service ==
Stokes cleared the Indian civil service examinations and qualified for the civil service in 1871. In India, he served as a member of the executive council of the Governor of Madras from 1896 to 1906 and from 1906 to 1907.

== Governor of Madras ==
Gabriel Stokes acted as the Governor of Madras from 15 February 1906 to 28 March 1906. During his tenure, the Asian Petroleum Company began its work in Madras.

== Death ==
He died at his home, 72 Morehampton Road in Dublin, on 22 October 1920.

== Honours ==
He was appointed a Companion of the Order of the Star of India (CSI) in the 1903 Durbar Honours, and in the 1909 New Year Honours, Stokes was made a Knight Commander of the same order (KCSI) for his services to the Crown.

Government offices
| Preceded by Oliver Russell, 2nd Baron Ampthill | Governor of Madras; 15 February 1906 – 28 March 1906 | Succeeded by Arthur Lawley, 6th Baron Wenlock |
