= Donald Stokes =

Donald Stokes may refer to:

- Donald Stokes, Baron Stokes (1914–2008)), English industrialist
- Donald E. Stokes (1927–1997), American political scientist
