= Chris Stokes =

Chris Stokes may refer to:

- Chris Stokes (footballer) (born 1991), English footballer
- Chris Stokes (bobsledder) (born 1963), Jamaican bobsledder
- Chris Stokes (filmmaker) (born 1969), American record producer, manager, and film director
