= John N. Stokes Sr. =

Sheriff and politician from Florida

Rev. John N. Stokes Sr.
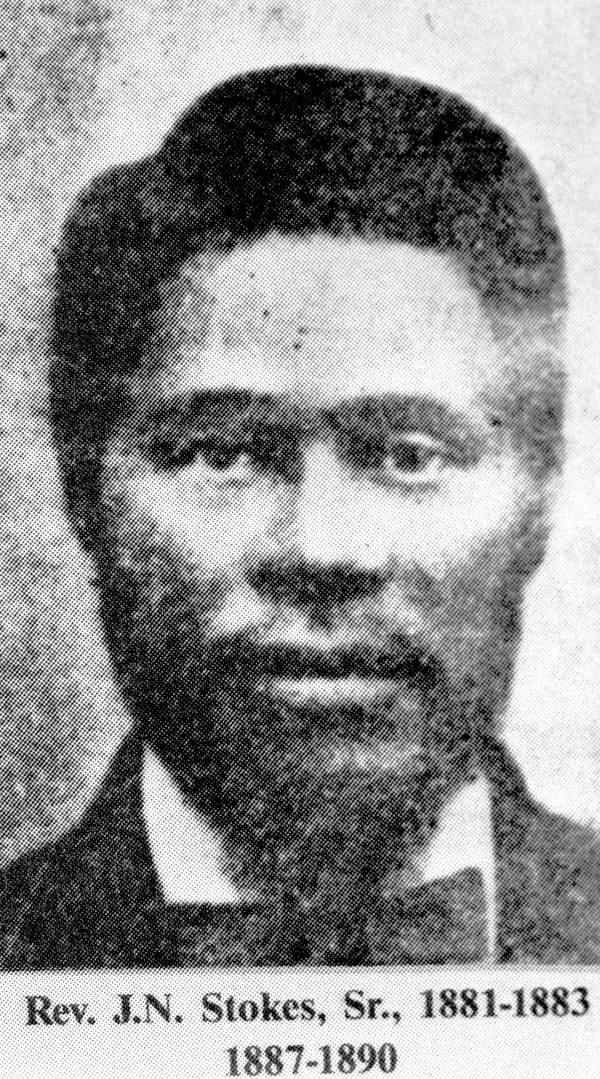
- Rev. John N. Stokes Sr.

Personal details
- Died: 1905
- Occupation: blacksmith, Baptist minister, sheriff, politician, and city councilor

John N. Stokes Sr. (died 1905) was a blacksmith, Baptist minister, sheriff, and politician in Tallahassee, Florida. He chaired the Leon County Republican Party, served in the Florida House of Representatives, was sheriff of Leon County, Florida, and served on the Tallahassee City Council. Later in life, he edited and published a Baptist newspaper in Live Oak, Florida.

== Political career ==
Stokes chaired the Leon County Republican Party in 1872. In 1873, he was nominated in the Florida Senate to be sheriff but the proposal was voted down. He served in the Florida House of Representatives in 1874. He served on the Committee on Enrolled Bills. In 1876, he was a candidate for state senator.

He succeeded fellow African American Phillip DeCoursey as sheriff after the latter's death. He served as Sheriff of Leon County from 1875 to 1877. It was more than 100 years before Leon County had another Black sheriff, Walt McNeil.

Stokes served two terms on Tallahassee's City Council from 1877 to 1889 and from 1881 to 1883. A photo of Stokes is in the Florida Archives. His home was reportedly attacked by a crowd that proceeded to "brick bat" his home but he faced them off.

== Later life ==
In the early 1890s, Stokes edited and published the Florida Baptist Herald in Live Oak, Florida.

Stokes died in 1905.

== See also ==
- African American officeholders from the end of the Civil War until before 1900
