= Elizabeth Joan Stokes =

English bacteriologist

Elizabeth Joan Stokes FRCP
- Born: Elizabeth Joan Rooke; 6 May 1912; Hampstead, London
- Died: 28 January 2010 (aged 97)
- Education: University College Hospital
- Known for: Stokes method
- Spouse: John Fisher Stokes (m. 1940)
- Relatives: Robert Pearce (grandfather)
- Scientific career
- Fields: Clinical medicine; bacteriology
- Workplaces: University College Hospital

Elizabeth Joan Stokes (née Rooke; 6 May 1912 – 28 January 2010) was an English bacteriologist. She spent the majority of her career as a clinical bacteriologist at University College Hospital in London.

== Biography ==
Elizabeth Joan Stokes was born on 6 May 1912 in Hampstead, London, to Thomas Rooke, an engineer, and Elizabeth Frances Pearce, whose father was the Liberal MP Robert Pearce. She attended University College Hospital Medical School (now a part of UCL Medical School) and graduated with an MBBS in 1937. She worked at UCH as a house physician, house surgeon and casualty officer before becoming a medical registrar under Thomas Lewis in 1940. When UCH was evacuated to Cardiff in 1941, Stokes decided to make a career change from clinical medicine to pathology. She began training as a pathologist at the London Public Health Laboratory in Watford, where she worked with Arnold Ashley Miles. She was promoted to the role of public health bacteriologist in 1944 and returned to UCH as a clinical bacteriologist in 1946. She was the first person to hold that position at UCH, and remained there until her retirement in 1977.

Stokes is credited as a pioneer in turning bacteriology into a clinical subspecialty of medicine, rather than a strictly scientific branch of pathology. She developed a standardised method for testing antibiotic sensitivity, which was named the Stokes method and was the standard test until the 1980s. Her textbook, titled Clinical Bacteriology and later Clinical Microbiology, was first published in 1955 and continued until its seventh edition in 1993. Stokes was elected Fellow of the Royal College of Physicians (FRCP) in 1958. She was a founding fellow of the Royal College of Pathologists in 1963, and later served on its council. She served as president of the Royal Society of Medicine's pathology division in 1967–68, and in 1971 she became a fellow of University College London. She retired in 1977 and died on 28 January 2010, at the age of 97.

In 1940 in Chelsea, London, she married the physician John Fisher Stokes, who was elected FRCP in 1947. The marriage lasted 69 years. They were the first husband and wife who were both elected FRCP. They had a son, a daughter, and five grandchildren.
