= Vin Maguire =

Australian rules footballer

Personal information
- Full name: Vincent James Maguire
- Born: 31 July 1892; Geelong, Victoria
- Died: 8 June 1929 (aged 36); Geelong West, Victoria
- Original team: Brighton

Playing career^{1}
Years	Club	Games (Goals)
1915, 1917–19	Geelong	43 (8)
- ^{1} Playing statistics correct to the end of 1919.

Vincent James Maguire (31 July 1892 – 8 June 1929) was an Australian rules footballer who played with Geelong in the Victorian Football League (VFL).
