= James Stokes =

James Stokes may refer to:

- James Stokes (VC) (1915–1945), British Army soldier and recipient of the Victoria Cross
- James Stokes (rugby union) (born 1991), English rugby union player
- James Boulter Stokes (1804–1881), American businessman
- James Graham Phelps Stokes (1872–1960), American socialist, railroad president, political activist, and philanthropist
- J. William Stokes (1853–1901), U.S. representative from South Carolina
- James Hughes Stokes (c. 1814 or 1815 – 1890), Union Army officer during the American Civil War
- Chase Stokes (James Alexander Chase Stokes, born 1992), American actor and director
