= Stokes Bay (disambiguation) =

Stokes Bay (or Stokes' Bay) may refer to:

== Bays ==
- Stokes Bay, a bay in Hampshire, England, UK
- Stokes Bay (South Australia), a bay on the north coast of Kangaroo Island, Australia
- Stokes Bay (Ontario), a bay on Bruce Peninsula, Canada

== Places ==
- Stokes Bay, South Australia, a locality on the north coast of Kangaroo Island, Australia
- Stokes Bay, Ontario (community), a community on the Bruce Peninsula, Canada

== See also ==
- Stokes Bay line, a former short railway branch line in Hampshire, England
  - Stokes Bay railway station, a station on the line
- Stokes Bay Lines, 19th century fortifications of Portsmouth Harbour, Hampshire, England
- Stokes Valley, New Zealand
