= Whitley Stokes (physician) =

Irish doctor and polymath

Whitely Stokes
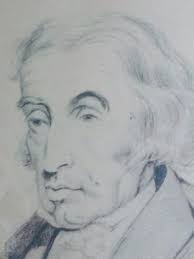
- Born: 1763
- Died: 1845 (aged 81–82)
- Education: Trinity College Dublin
- Occupations: Physician, mathematician
- Notable work: Observations on Contagion (1818), Observations on the population and resources of Ireland (1821).
- Movement: Society of United Irishmen

Whitley Stokes (1763–1845) was an Irish physician and polymath. A one-time United Irishman, in 1798 he was sanctioned by Trinity College Dublin for his alleged republicanism. In 1821, he published a rebuttal of Robert Malthus's thesis that, as spurs to population growth, in Ireland attempts to improve the general welfare are self-defeating. The country's problem, Stokes argued, was not her "numbers" but her indifferent government.

== Medical and academic career ==
Stokes was born in Waterford, son of Gabriel Stokes (1732–1806), DD, chancellor of the cathedral, and master of Waterford endowed school, where the young Stokes had his primary education. At age 16 he was admitted to Trinity College Dublin (TCD) (Scholar 1781, BA 1783, MA 1789, MB & MD 1793) and completing studies medicine at the University of Edinburgh.

His first venture as a medical practitioner was in public health. He studied not only his patients' ailments but also their environments, noting that in the slums of Dublin certain families rented a small room for a few guineas a year, sub-letting to others who paid them sixpence-halfpenny per week to lay down a bed of straw in a corner.

Having been admitted as a licentiate of the College of Physicians in 1795 without examination, in 1798 he was appointed Regius Professor of Medicine at TCD (a position he held until 1811), and was elected a Fellow of the College in 1800. At the same time, "with the assurance of a polymath", from 1807 he was Donegall Lecturer in Mathematics and offered a course in natural history. He left TCD to hold the chair of medicine at Royal College of Surgeons in Ireland (RCSI) 1819-1828. Returning to TCD he became Regius Professor of Physic (1830-1840). In 1814 he funded an English-Irish dictionary.

His principal medical works of Whitley Stokes are "On an eruptive disease of children", published in the Dublin Medical and Physical Essays (1808), and Observations on Contagion (1818). From 1818 to 1826 he was on the staff of the Meath Hospital where his services were available to the sick poor, and he worked through two typhus epidemics.

== Suspect United Irishman ==
In November 1791, Stokes was elected to the Society of the United Irishmen of Dublin, one of eighteen persons nominated in their absence. With Thomas Russell and Wolfe Tone, he was critical of William Drennan's membership Test. Its call for "a brotherhood of affection [...] and a union of power among Irishmen of every religious persuasion" to secure “an impartial and adequate representation of the Irish nation in parliament", was too rhetorical.

A month in advance of the first of the United Irish risings in May 1798, at TCD Stokes was brought before the Lord Chancellor of Ireland, Lord Clare. He admitted to having collected and given evidence to the liberal Lord Moira on the atrocities and tortures visited upon country people by Crown forces as they sought to break up and disarm the United Irish organisation; but denied himself having had any part in the movement as it prepared for insurrection. Clare found him "a most improper person to be entrusted in any degree with the government or direction of the college". He was suspended as a tutor, and barred from election to senior fellowship, for three years.

Stokes allowed his membership of the United Irishmen to lapse, but when in January 1793 the Society appointed a committee to draw up a scheme of parliamentary reform, he had submitted a plan. It broadened the franchise but fell short of the principle of universal male suffrage that the Society ultimately approved.

In July 1792, he had accompanied Tone on a visit to Belfast where Tone introduced him to his fellow physician-polymath Dr James MacDonnell. Like McDonnell, Stokes befriended, and maintained a correspondence, with Thomas Russell without embracing the United Irishman‘s radical democratic and insurrectionary politics. Stokes treated Russell when he became seriously ill during his imprisonment in Newgate in 1797.

In an independent Ireland, Wolfe Tone had imagined Stokes as "the head of a system of national education".

== Disputes the Malthusian "trap" ==
Acknowledging the assistance of, among others, James MacDonnell and John Templeton of Belfast, in 1821 Stokes published Observations on the population and resources of Ireland. Stokes was returning to the theme of an earlier work, Projects for re-establishing the internal peace and tranquillity of Ireland (1799) in which he had argued that if in Ireland the "value" [i.e. the productivity] of labour could be increased, the country might sustain many times its present population. In the new work, he questioned the "trap" or "spectre" of population growth proposed by Robert Malthus: the argument that as common people use "abundance" to enlarge families rather than to increase their comforts, "all attempts ... to ameliorate the condition of the poor are fruitless and mistaken".

Already, as a medical man, he had deplored what he depicted as the Malthusian view of hospitals, workhouses and quarantines as vain attempts to "delay the thinning of the people, which is necessary to the happiness of mankind". He urged the government to ignore the new fixation with numbers and make health a priority.

Insisting upon the advantages mankind derives from "improved industry, improved conveyance, improvements in morals, government and religion", in Observations Stokes faulted Malthus's calculations. He denied that there was a "law of nature" that procreation must outrun the means of subsistence. Ireland was not, as English opinion so widely held, overpopulated thanks to the prolific potato. Rather than fret about “our numbers", Stokes argued for the division of large holdings, the encouragement and assistance of manufacture, and investment in inland navigation and roads. Once the Irish begin to feel "whole clothes" on their backs, "effort for profit will be made."

In An Inquiry Concerning the Population of Nations containing a Refutation of Mr. Malthus's Essay on Population (1818), George Ensor had developed a similar broadside against Malthusian political economy, arguing that poverty was sustained not by a reckless propensity to propagate, but rather by the state's indulgence of the heedless concentration of private wealth. It is not clear whether Stokes was familiar with the work.

== Personal life ==
In 1796 Stokes married Mary Ann Picknall. They had five sons and five daughters. He was the father the physician William Stokes (1804–78) who succeeded him as Regius Professor of Physic at TCD, and through William the grandfather of Whitley Stokes, the Celtic Scholar (1830–1909), and the Irish antiquarian Margaret Stokes (1832–1900), and through William–Henry the great grandfather of Adrian Stokes, the physician who discovered the virus (now named Orthoflavivirus flava) that caused yellow fever.

Whitley Stokes died 13 April 1845 at 16 Harcourt St., Dublin, aged 82.

== Publications ==
- 1795: A reply to Mr Paine's Age of Reason addressed to the Students of Trinity College, Dublin
- 1799: Projects for re-establishing the internal peace and tranquillity of Ireland. Dublin, For James Moore.
- 1808: Observations on the necessity of publishing the Scriptures in the Irish language
- 1808: "On an Eruptive Disease of Children" Stokes W., US National Library of Medicine National Institutes of Health: Med Phys J. 1808 Apr;19(110):344-350.
- 1818: Observations on contagion. Dublin, For Hodges and McArthur
- 1821: Observations on the population and resources of Ireland, Dublin, Joshua Porter
