= Arthur Stokes (footballer) =

English footballer

Personal information
- Full name: Arthur William Stokes
- Date of birth: 16 May 1868
- Place of birth: Bloxwich, England
- Date of death: 1960 (aged 91–92)
- Position: Full back

Senior career*
Years	Team	Apps	(Gls)
1888	Wednesbury Old Athletic		
1889–1892	Walsall Town Swifts		
1891–1893	Aston Villa	13	(0)
1893–1894	Burton Swifts	7	(1)
1894	Loughborough		
1894–1895	Walsall Town Swifts	2	(0)
- * Club domestic league appearances and goals

Arthur William Stokes (16 May 1868 – 1960) was an English professional footballer who played in the Football League for Aston Villa, Burton Swifts and Walsall Town Swifts.
