= Henry Stokes =

Irish civil servant (1841–1926)

Sir Henry Stokes KCSI
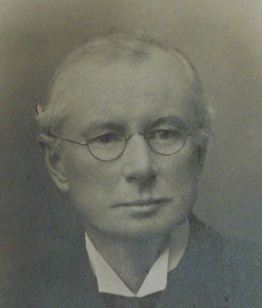
- Portrait photograph of Sir Henry Edward Stokes
- Born: 23 July 1841
- Died: 20 October 1926 (aged 85)
- Occupation: civil servant
- Known for: member of the Madras Legislative Council (1888–1893)
- Relatives: Gabriel Stokes (brother)
- Awards: Companion of the Order of the Star of India, Knight Commander of the Order of the Star of India

Sir Henry Edward Stokes KCSI (23 July 1841 – 20 October 1926) was an Irish civil servant of the Indian Civil Service who served as a member of the Madras Legislative Council from 1888 to 1893.

== Early life and education ==
Stokes was born on 23 July 1841 to Henry Stokes, the county surveyor of Kerry. A member of a notable family of academics associated with Trinity College, Dublin, Stokes was a grandson of Whitley Stokes (Regius Professor of Physic at Trinity College, Dublin), the great-grandson of Gabriel Stokes (Professor of Mathematics at Trinity College, Dublin) and a great-great-grandson of Gabriel Stokes (the Deputy Surveyor General of Ireland). Other family connections included John Stokes (Regius Professor of Greek at Trinity College, Dublin), William Stokes (Regius Professor of Physic at Trinity College, Dublin), Whitley Stokes and distantly, Sir George Stokes, 1st baronet. He was educated at Kilkenny College, Trinity College, Dublin and entered the Madras Civil Service in 1858.

== Career ==
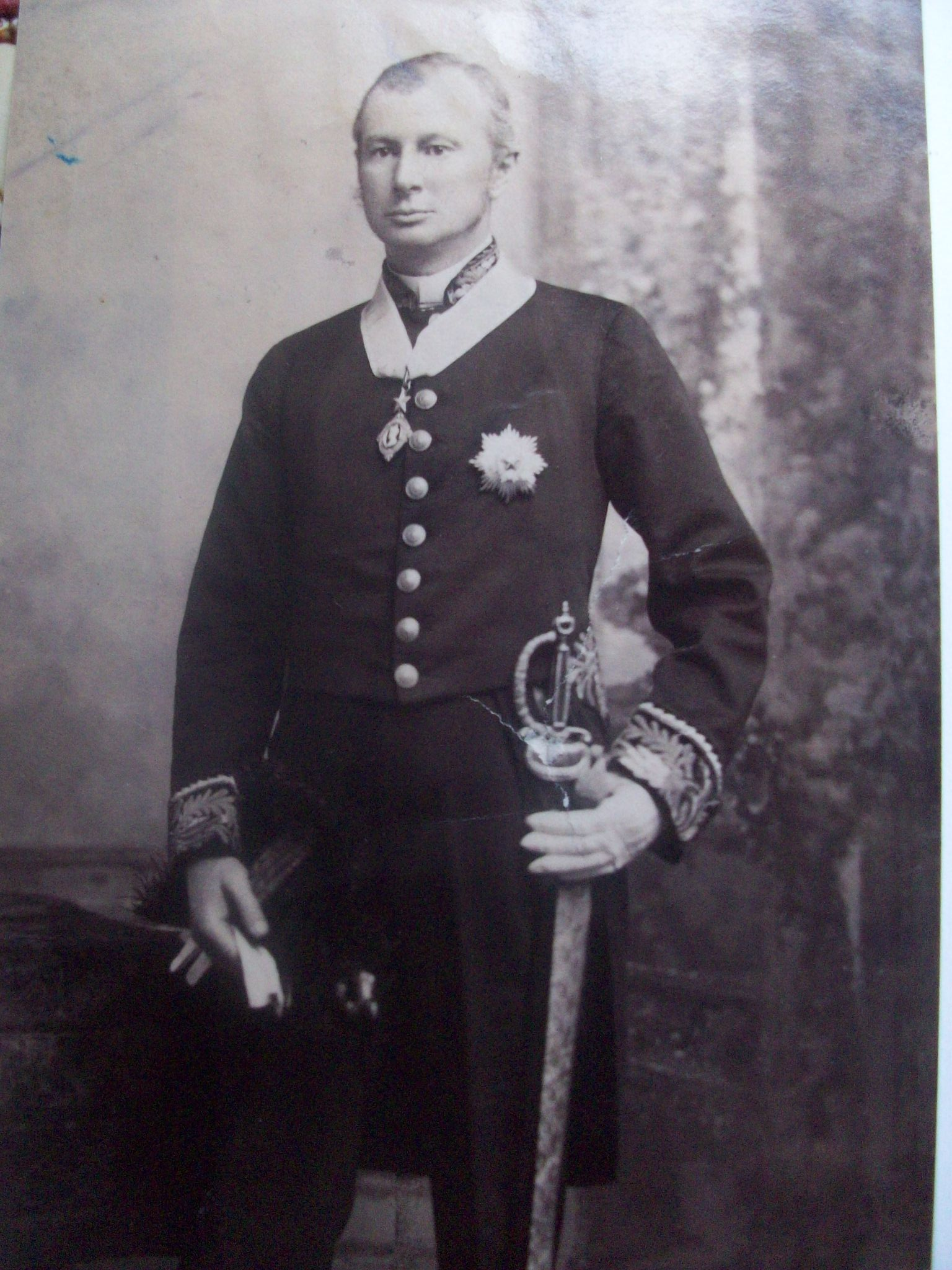
Sir Henry Edward Stokes in the uniform of the Indian Civil Service

Stokes served as Chief Secretary to the Madras government from 1883 to 1888. In 1888, he was nominated to the Madras Legislative Council and served in the council from 1888 to 1893. A younger brother, (Sir) Gabriel Stokes, and a son, (Sir) Hopetoun Gabriel Stokes, followed him in the public service in India.

== Honours ==
Stokes was appointed a Companion of the Order of the Star of India in 1889, being advanced to Knight Commander of the Order of the Star of India in 1892.
