= David Stokes (English footballer) =

English footballer

Personal information
- Full name: David Stokes
- Date of birth: 1880
- Place of birth: Kingswinford, England
- Position: Outside right

Senior career*
Years	Team	Apps	(Gls)
1896-1897	Kingswinford Albion		
1897–1898	Wordsley Olympic		
1898–1899	Halesowen		
1899–1900	Brierley Hill Alliance		
1900–1901	Aston Villa	0	(0)
1901	Brierley Hill Alliance		
1901–1920	Bolton Wanderers	387	(43)
1920	Brierley Hill Alliance		
1920–1921	Wolverhampton Wanderers	7	(0)

International career
	Football League XI	4	
- * Club domestic league appearances and goals

David Stokes was an English professional footballer who made over 380 appearances in the Football League for Bolton Wanderers as an outside forward. He represented the Football League XI.

== Personal life ==
Stokes was the uncle of footballer Ray Westwood

== Career statistics ==
Appearances and goals by club, season and competition
Club	Season	League			FA Cup		Total	
Club	Season	Division	Apps	Goals	Apps	Goals	Apps	Goals
Bolton Wanderers	1901–02	First Division	12	2	0	0	12	2
Bolton Wanderers	1902–03	First Division	16	3	0	0	16	3
Bolton Wanderers	1903–04	Second Division	2	0	0	0	2	0
Bolton Wanderers	1905–06	First Division	38	6	0	0	38	6
Bolton Wanderers	1906–07	First Division	33	5	0	0	33	5
Bolton Wanderers	1907–08	First Division	38	1	0	0	38	1
Bolton Wanderers	1909–10	First Division	23	1	0	0	23	1
Bolton Wanderers	1911–12	First Division	36	3	0	0	36	3
Bolton Wanderers	1912–13	First Division	18	0	0	0	18	0
Bolton Wanderers	1913–14	First Division	7	1	0	0	7	1
Bolton Wanderers	1914–15	First Division	21	3	7	0	28	3
Bolton Wanderers	1919–20	First Division	11	1	0	0	11	1
Bolton Wanderers	Total		255	26	7	0	262	26
Wolverhampton Wanderers	1920–21	Second Division	7	0	0	0	7	0
Career total			262	26	7	0	269	26

== Honours ==
Bolton Wanderers

- Football League Second Division: 1908–09
- Football League Second Division promotion: 1904–05, 1910–11
