= John Fisher Stokes =

British physician

- Born: 9 September 1912; Bexhill, Sussex, England
- Died: 11 May 2010 (aged 97)
- Known for: Physician and surgeon
- Sports career
- Sport: squash
Medal record
British Amateur Championships
Silver medal – second place	1937/1938	singles

John Fisher Stokes FRCP FRCPE (19 September 1912 – 11 May 2010) was a physician and surgeon, who earned a footnote in the history of the Royal College of Physicians by becoming part of the first married couple who were both elected FRCP.

== Biography ==
After education at Haileybury School, John Fisher Stokes matriculated at Gonville and Caius College, Cambridge, where he graduated in 1937 MB MChir (Cantab.) after medical study at University College Hospital Medical School. In 1937 he qualified MRCS, LRCP from University College Hospital (UCH), where he was a house physician and house surgeon. At UCH he successively became a resident medical officer and a medical registrar. In 1939 he qualified MRCP. Stokes joined in 1942 the RAMC, served as a physician in Burma Campaign, was mentioned in dispatches, and attained the rank of lieutenant colonel. He was a consultant physician at UCH from 1946 until he retired in 1977. In 1947 he graduated MD and was elected FRCP. In 1975 he was elected FRCPE.

He was a censor at the RCP (from 1963 to 1964), and then became academic vice-president (1968 to 1969), and gave his time and commitment to the MRCP examination. ... He was concerned to standardise the MRCP and was a main driver behind the introduction of multiple choice questions into the examination.

Stokes gave the Bradshaw Lecture in 1973 and the Harveian Oration in 1981. For many years he was a trustee of the Leeds Castle Foundation, a private charitable trust.

... he reached the finals of the British Amateur Squash Championships in 1937, played international squash in 1938 and he loved real tennis. He played the piano brilliantly, to a standard which enabled him to perform publicly, giving a concert to a packed audience in the library at UCH with a university orchestra. He completed The Times crossword daily well into his nineties. His Harley Street rooms were decorated by competent and attractive watercolours he had painted whilst in the RAMC in Burma.

In 1940 he married the microbiologist Joan Stokes née Rooke, who was elected FRCP in 1947. They were married for 69 years and John died a few months after Joan died. They were survived by a son, a daughter, five grandchildren, and three great-grandchildren. For a number of years, John and Joan Stokes lived next door to, and were friends of, the actor Alastair Sim and his wife, Naomi.

== Selected publications ==
- Stokes, J. F. (1942). "Pancreatic Deficiency". Proceedings of the Royal Society of Medicine. 35 (8): 544. doi:10.1177/003591574203500816. PMC 1998287.
- Stokes, J. F.; Owen, J. R.; Holmes, E. G. (1945). "Neurological Complications of Infective Hepatitis". British Medical Journal. 2 (4427): 642–644. doi:10.1136/bmj.2.4427.642. PMC 2060256. PMID 20786387.
- Ransome, G. A.; Stokes, J. F. (1945). "Saline, Sulphaguanidine, and the Amoeba". British Medical Journal. 2 (4412): 133. doi:10.1136/bmj.2.4412.133-a. PMC 2059465.
- Ransome, G. A.; Van Someren, R. K.; Stokes, J. F. (1946). "Conus Medullaris Syndrome in Spinal Contusion". British Medical Journal. 2 (4463): 87–88. doi:10.1136/bmj.2.4463.87. PMC 2053973. PMID 20786818.
- Stokes, J. F.; Gray, I. R.; Stokes, E. J. (1951). "Actinomyces Muris Endocarditis Treated with Chloramphenicol". British Heart Journal. 13 (2): 247–251. doi:10.1136/hrt.13.2.247. PMC 479414. PMID 14821208.
- Wolff, H. H.; Stokes, J. F.; Schlesinger, B. E. (1952). "Vascular Abnormalities Associated with Pseudoxanthoma Elasticum". Archives of Disease in Childhood. 27 (131): 82–88. doi:10.1136/adc.27.131.82. PMC 1988459. PMID 14904120.
- Johnson, A. G.; Stokes, J. F. (1964). "Fibrosarcoma of the Heart Diagnosed During Life". British Medical Journal. 1 (5381): 480–481. doi:10.1136/bmj.1.5381.480. PMC 1813640. PMID 14085978.
- Stokes, J. F.; Turnberg, L. A.; Hawksley, J. C. (1964). "Hyperplasia of Brunner's glands". Gut. 5 (5): 459–462. doi:10.1136/gut.5.5.459. PMC 1552146. PMID 14218263.
- Stokes, J. F. (1973). "Personal View". British Medical Journal. 2 (5864): 480. doi:10.1136/bmj.2.5864.480. PMC 1589432.
- Stokes, J. F. (1973). "Diagnostic Approaches in Liver Disease: The Bradshaw Lecture 1973". Journal of the Royal College of Physicians of London. 8 (1): 5–16. PMC 5366585. PMID 4583704.
- Stokes, J. F. (1973). "Statistics and the M.R.C.P". British Medical Journal. 4 (5889): 421. doi:10.1136/bmj.4.5889.421. PMC 1587837.
- Fleming, P. R.; Manderson, W. G.; Matthews, M. B.; Sanderson, P. H.; Stokes, J. F. (1974). "Evolution of an Examination: M.R.C.P. (U.K.)". British Medical Journal. 2 (5910): 99–107. doi:10.1136/bmj.2.5910.99. PMC 1610728. PMID 4596404.
- Stokes, J. F. (1974). "Chairman's Introduction". Proceedings of the Royal Society of Medicine. 67 (6 Pt 2): 548. PMC 1645580. PMID 4604200.
- Stokes, J. F. (1979). "How to do it. Take a clinical examination". British Medical Journal. 1 (6156): 98–99. doi:10.1136/bmj.1.6156.98. PMC 1598160. PMID 761009.
- Stokes, J. F. (1979). "How to take a clinical examination". British Medical Journal. 1 (6161): 488. doi:10.1136/bmj.1.6161.488-a. PMC 1597770.
