= J. Ed Stokes =

American politician

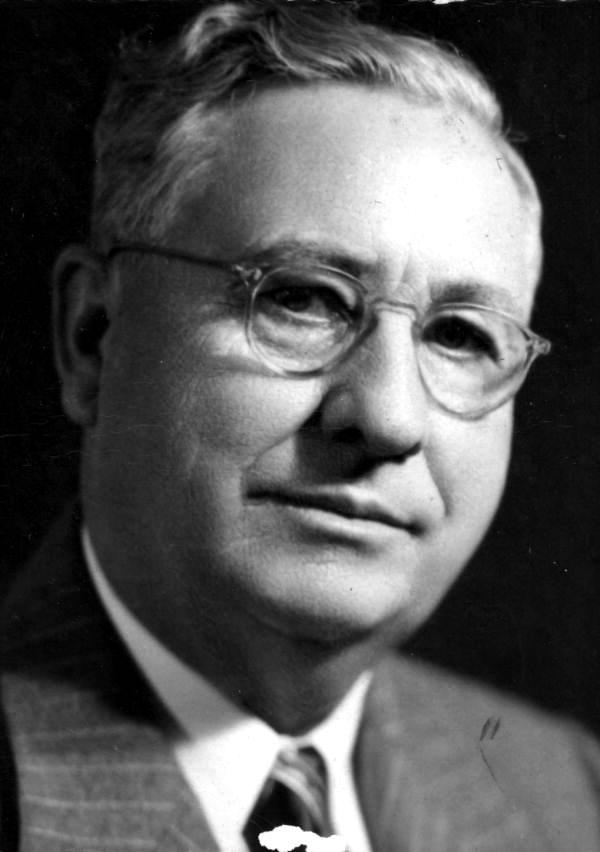

Member of the Florida House of Representatives from the Bay County district
- In office 1918–1925, 1929, 1947, 1953

Personal details
- Born: John Ed Stokes; May 7, 1888 Abbeville, Alabama
- Died: September 5, 1964 (aged 76) Panama City, Florida
- Party: Democratic
- Education: University of Florida
- Occupation: lawyer

John Ed Stokes (May 7, 1888 – September 5, 1964) was an American politician in the state of Florida.

Stokes was born in 1888 in Abbeville, Henry County, Alabama. He attended the University of Florida from 1915 to 1916, and was admitted to the Floridian bar upon his year of graduation. He settled in Panama City, Florida where he practiced law with the Stokes & Douglas firm. He was elected to the Florida House of Representatives in 1918, serving until 1925, again in 1929, 1947 and 1953. He was Bay County's prosecuting attorney from 1919 to 1925 and 1928 to 1929. He also owned Stokes Jewelry Company in Panama City. He died there in 1964.
