= John Stokes (British Army officer) =

British army officer

Lieutenant-General Sir John Stokes KCB
- Stokes ca. 1890
- Born: 25 June 1825; Cobham, Kent
- Died: 11 November 1902 (aged 77); Ewell, Surrey
- Military career
- Allegiance: United Kingdom
- Branch: British Army
- Service years: 1843–1887
- Rank: Lieutenant-General
- Unit: Royal Engineers
- Conflicts: Xhosa Wars 1845–47, 1850–52; Siege of Sevastopol (1854–1855)
- Awards: Knight Commander of the Bath

Lieutenant-General Sir John Stokes, KCB (17 June 1825 – 11 November 1902) was a British Army officer heavily involved in the success of the running of the Suez Canal Company.

== Career ==
Stokes was the second son of the Rev. John Stokes, Vicar of Cobham, Kent, where his son was born in 1825. Educated at Rochester Proprietary School and at the Royal Military Academy, he passed into the Royal Engineers in 1843. Two years later he left for South Africa, where he spent the first years of his career, taking part in the Xhosa Wars of 1845–47 and 1850–52 (later known as the seventh and eight Xhosa wars), for which he was mentioned in despatches. He was promoted to captain in 1854 and major in 1856. He led an Engineer corps during the Crimean War, and was present during the siege and fall of Sevastopol in 1855. The following year he was Her Majesty's Commissioner on the European Commission formed to open the mouth of the River Danube, and acted in that capacity for 15 years, during which time order was restored to the delta of the Danube, and the river at its mouth and for 100 miles inland was made navigable by larger ships. For his service he was made a Companion of the Order of the Bath (CB), civil division, in 1871, and the following year he was appointed to command the Royal Engineers in South Wales, and promoted to colonel.

In 1873 he was again sent abroad, this time to Constantinople as a British member on the International Commission on Tonnage and the Suez Canal Dues. After the opening of the Suez Canal in 1869, the company running the canal soon found itself in financial difficulties. Traffic was below expectations after the canal was finished in 1871, and its manager Ferdinand de Lesseps therefore tried to increase revenues by re-interpreting the definition of tonnage allowed. The ensuing commercial and diplomatic activities resulted in the International Commission of Constantinople, establishing a specific kind of net tonnage and settling the question of tariffs in its protocol of 18 December 1873. This was the origin of the Suez Canal Net Tonnage and the Suez Canal Special Tonnage Certificate, both of which are still in use today. Stokes had visited the canal to write up reports on its condition, and was considered instrumental in making the protocol be recognized in the ensuing years. He was knighted as a Knight Commander of the Order of the Bath (KCB), civil division, in 1877. In the following years he was a member of an international commission to decide harbour dues for Alexandria, and in 1880 a member of the Royal Commission on Ship's Tonnage Measurement.

During the early 1870s he was briefly in command of the School of Military Engineering at Chatham, and in 1881 he received a War Office appointment as Deputy Adjutant-General (DAG) for Royal Engineers at Army Headquarters – a post which he held for five years. Promoted to major-general in 1885, he retired from the Army in 1887 with the rank of lieutenant-general. In retirement, he retained his interest in the Suez Canal Company, of which he was a vice-president until his death.

He died at his residence, The Spring House, Ewell, Surrey on 11 October 1902.

== Family ==
Stokes married, in 1849, Henrietta Georgina de Villiers Maynard, daughter of Charles Maynard, of Grahamstown, Cape Colony. Lady Stokes died in 1893. They had eight children, among whom was Brigadier-General Alfred Stokes, CB, CMG, DSO (1860–1931) of the Royal Artillery.
