= Stokes Township, Itasca County, Minnesota =

Stokes Township, Minnesota
- Township
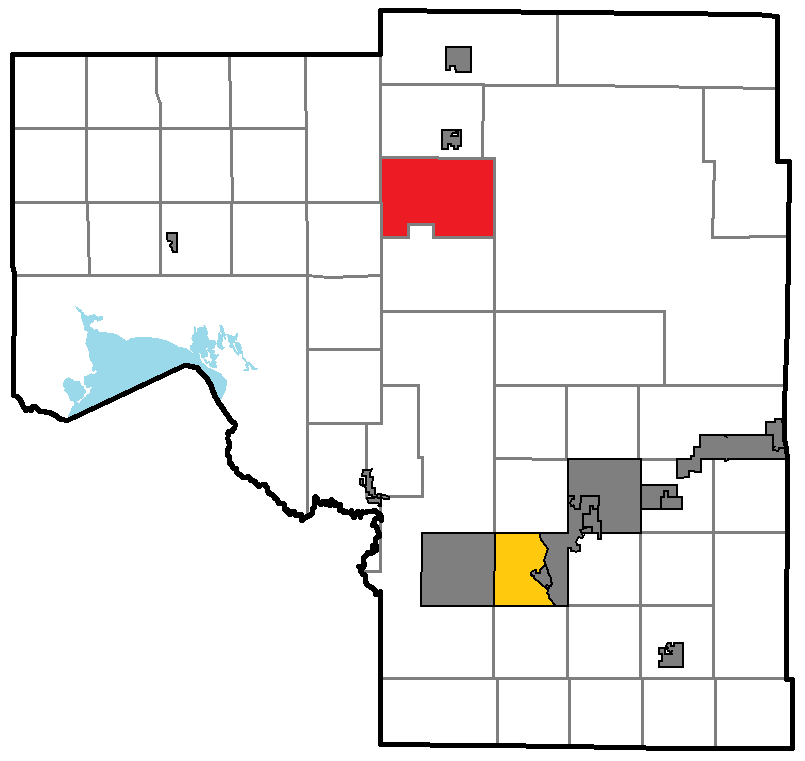
- Location of Stokes Township, within Itasca County, Minnesota
- Coordinates: 47°40′49″N 93°42′11″W
- Country: United States
- State: Minnesota
- County: Itasca

Area
  - Total: 57.3 sq mi (148.5 km^{2})
  - Land: 52.5 sq mi (136.1 km^{2})
  - Water: 4.8 sq mi (12.5 km^{2})
- Elevation: 1,309 ft (399 m)

Population (2020)
  - Total: 207
  - Density: 3.94/sq mi (1.52/km^{2})
- Time zone: UTC-6 (Central (CST))
  - Summer (DST): UTC-5 (CDT)
- ZIP code: 56628
- Area code: 218
- FIPS code: 27-62914
- GNIS feature ID: 0665715

Stokes Township is a township in Itasca County, Minnesota, United States. The population was 207 at the 2020 census.

== Geography ==
According to the United States Census Bureau, the township has a total area of 57.3 square miles (148.5 km^{2}), of which 52.5 square miles (136.1 km^{2}) is land and 4.8 square miles (12.5 km^{2}), or 8.39%, is water.

== Demographics ==
As of the census of 2000, there were 259 people, 103 households, and 77 families living in the township. The population density was 4.9 people per square mile (1.9/km^{2}). There were 273 housing units at an average density of 5.2/sq mi (2.0/km^{2}). The racial makeup of the township was 98.46% White, 0.39% African American, 0.39% Native American, and 0.77% from two or more races. Hispanic or Latino of any race were 0.39% of the population.

There were 103 households, out of which 27.2% had children under the age of 18 living with them, 68.9% were married couples living together, 4.9% had a female householder with no husband present, and 25.2% were non-families. 21.4% of all households were made up of individuals, and 8.7% had someone living alone who was 65 years of age or older. The average household size was 2.48 and the average family size was 2.84.

In the township the population was spread out, with 25.5% under the age of 18, 4.6% from 18 to 24, 22.0% from 25 to 44, 23.6% from 45 to 64, and 24.3% who were 65 years of age or older. The median age was 44 years. For every 100 females, there were 93.3 males. For every 100 females age 18 and over, there were 94.9 males.

The median income for a household in the township was $33,750, and the median income for a family was $42,813. Males had a median income of $26,875 versus $33,250 for females. The per capita income for the township was $18,444. About 5.2% of families and 11.0% of the population were below the poverty line, including 6.6% of those under the age of eighteen and 11.8% of those 65 or over.
