= List of presidents of the Royal College of Physicians of Ireland =

The president of the Royal College of Physicians of Ireland (RCPI) is the elected head of the Royal College of Physicians of Ireland.

== Presidents of the Royal College of Physicians of Ireland ==
- 1667–1669 John Stearne
- 1672–1674 Sir Abraham Yarner
- 1674-1675, 1695-1696, 1701-1702, 1707-1708 Ralph Howard
- 1675-1677 Charles Willoughby
- 1677-1681 Robert Waller
- 1681-1686, 1690-1693, 1696-1697, 1698-1699, 1706-1707 Sir Patrick Dun
- 1687-1690 (election not confirmed) John Crosby
- 1694-1695, 1697-1698, 1700-1701 John Madden
- 1699-1700 Duncan Cumings
- 1702-1703, 1709-1710, 1713-1714, 1720-1721 Sir Thomas Molyneux, 1st Baronet
- 1703-1704, 1710 Richard Steevens
- 1704-1705, 1708-1709, 1710-1711, 1719-1720, 1721-1722 William Smyth
- 1705-1706, 1711-1712 Robert Griffith
- 1712-1713, 1723-1724 Patrick Mitchell
- 1714-1715, 1722-1723, 1738-1739 James Grattan
- 1715-1716, 1724-1725 Richard Hoyle
- 1728-1729 Richard Helsham
- 1717-1718, 1726-1727 Samuel Jemmat
- 1718-1719, 1727-1728, 1739-1740 Bryan Robinson
- 1728-1729, 1740-1741 Henry Cope
- 1729-1730, 1741-1742 Francis LeHunte
- 1730-1731 Samuel Arnoldi
- 1731-1732 Thomas Madden
- 1732-1733 Alexander McNaughten
- 1733-1734, 1742-1743, 1759-1760 William Stephens
- 1734-1735 John Van Lewen
- 1735-1736, 1743-1744 John Hemsworth
- 1736-1737, 1744-1745 Thomas Kingsbury
- 1737-1738 Francis Foreside
- 1745-1746, 1761-1762 Patrick Hewetson
- 1746-1747 Edward Aston
- 1747-1748 Edward Smyth
- 1748-1749, 1760-1761 Robert Robinson
- 1749-1750 Sir Edward Barry, 1st Baronet
- 1750-1751 Thomas Lloyd
- 1751-1752 John Anderson
- 1752-1753, 1762-1763, 1770-1771, 1773-1774, 1778-1779 John Ferrall
- 1753-1754, 1763-1764 Ezekiel Nesbitt
- 1754-1755, 1764-1765, 1769-1770 Constantine Barbor
- 1755-1756 Anthony Relhan
- 1756-1757, 1765-1766 Richard Wood
- 1757-1758 Adam Humble
- 1758-1759, 1766-1767, 1771-1772, 1774-1775, 1779-1780, 1781-1782 Henry Quin
- 1767-1768, 1772-1773, 1775-1776 Sir Nathaniel Barry, 2nd Baronet
- 1768-1769, 1776-1777 Clement Archer
- 1777-1778, 1780-1781 Francis Hutcheson
- 1782-1783, 1789-1790, 1795-1796, 1801-1802, 1808-1809, 1813-1814 Edward Hill
- 1783-1784, 1790-1791, 1796-1797 Arthur Saunders
- 1784-1785, 1791-1792, 1797-1798, 1800, 1802-1803, 1809-1810, 1814-1815 William Harvey
- 1785-1786, 1792-1793, 1798-1799, 1803-1804, 1810-1811, 1815-1816 Francis Hopkins
- 1786-1787, 1793-1794, 1800-1801 Patrick Plunket
- 1787-1788, 1794-1795, 1799 (resigned) Edmund Cullen
- 1788-1789 Charles William Quin
- 1799–1800 Robert Perceval
- 1804-1805 Alexander Pelissier
- 1805-1806, 1806-1807, 1811-1812, 1816-1817 James Cleghorn
- 1807-1808 Daniel Mills
- 1812-1813, 1818-1819 Thomas Herbert Orpen
- 1817-1818 Anthony Gilholy
- 1819-1820, 1827-1828, 1831-1834 Hugh Ferguson
- 1820-1821 James Callanan
- 1821-1822 George Francis Todderick
- 1822-1823 Robert Bredin
- 1823-1824, 1829-1831 Samuel Litton
- 1824-1825 John O'Brien
- 1825-1826 James John Leahy
- 1826-1827 William Brooke
- 1828-1829 Charles Richard Alexander Lendrick
- 1834-1836 Jonathan Osborne
- 1836-1838 Charles Philips Croker
- 1838-1841 George Alexander Kennedy
- 1841-1843, 1845-1847, 1857-1859 Sir Henry Marsh, 1st Baronet
- 1843-1845 Robert James Graves
- 1847-1849 Robert Collins
- 1849-1851, 1866-1867 William Stokes
- 1851-1853 William Fetherston-Haugh Montgomery
- 1853-1855 Evory Kennedy
- 1855-1857 John Mollan
- 1859-1864 Sir Dominic Corrigan
- 1864-1866 Thomas Edward Beatty
- 1867-1869 Fleetwood Churchill
- 1869-1871 Sir John Thomas Banks
- 1871-1873 Alfred Hudson
- 1873-1875 James Foulis Duncan
- 1875-1878 Samuel Gordon
- 1878-1880 Henry Haswell Head
- 1880-1882 George Johnston
- 1882-1883 William Moore
- 1884-1886 Sir Francis Richard Cruise
- 1886-1888 James Little
- 1888-1890 Lombe Atthill
- 1890-1892 John Magee Finny
- 1892-1895 Walter George Smith
- 1895-1896 Thomas Wrigley Grimshaw
- 1896-1898 Sir George Frederick Duffey
- 1898-1900 Sir John William Moore
- 1900-1902 Sir Christopher Nixon
- 1902-1904 Sir Arthur Vernon Macan
- 1904-1906 Sir William Smyly
- 1906-1908 Sir Joseph Michael Redmond
- 1908-1910 Sir Andrew Horne
- 1910-1912 Sir John Hawtrey Benson
- 1912-1914 Charles Edward Fitzgerald
- 1914-1916 Ephraim MacDowel Cosgrave
- 1916-1919 Joseph O'Carroll
- 1919-1922 Sir James Craig
- 1922-1924 Michael Francis Cox
- 1924-1925 Sir William Thompson
- 1925-1927 Thomas Wilson
- 1927-1930 William Winter
- 1930-1933, 1934 Thomas Gillman Moorhead
- 1933-1934 Francis Purser
- 1934-1937 John Agar Matson
- 1937-1940 William Boxwell
- 1940-1943 Robert James Rowlette
- 1943-1946 William Geoffrey Harvey
- 1946-1949 Bethel Solomons
- 1949-1952 Leonard Abrahamson
- 1952-1955 Edward Freeman
- 1955-1958 Francis O'Donnell
- 1958-1960 Patrick O'Farrell
- 1960-1963 Robert Elsworth Steen
- 1963-1966 Robert Brian Pringle
- 1966-1969 Albert Thompson
- 1969-1972 David Mitchell
- 1972-1974 William J. E. Jessop
- 1974-1977 Bryan Alton
- 1977-1980 Alan Proctor Grant
- 1980-1983 Dermot Holland
- 1983-1986, 1989 John Kirker
- 1986-1988 Ivo Drury
- 1989-1991 Ciaran Barry
- 1991-1994 John Stephen Doyle
- 1994-1997 Stanley Roberts
- 1997-2000 Brian Keogh
- 2000-2003 Desmond Canavan
- 2003-2006 T J McKenna
- 2006-2007 John F. Murphy
- July 2007-2011 John Donohoe
- 2011-2014 John Crowe
- 2014-2017 Frank Murray
- 2017-2023 Mary Horgan
- 2023- Diarmuid O'Shea
