= Victoria Coffey =

Irish pediatrician (1911–1999)

- Born: 16 September 1911; Dublin, Ireland
- Died: 15 June 1999 (aged 87); Dublin, Ireland
- Education: Royal College of Surgeons in Ireland
- Known for: Sudden infant death syndrome

Victoria Coffey (16 September 1911 – 15 June 1999) was an Irish medical doctor and paediatrician. She was one of the first people to research sudden infant death syndrome (SIDS) and one of the first females to undertake significant research into congenital abnormalities. She also became the first female president of the Irish Paediatric Association, the paediatric section of the Royal Academy of Medicine in Ireland, the Royal College of Surgeons of Ireland (RCSI) Post-graduate Association, and the Irish American Pediatric Association. Coffey was also the first female recipient of the RCSI Distinguished Graduate medal.

== Early life and family ==
Victoria Philomena Dorothy Coffey was born on 16 September 1911 at 108 Brunswick Street (now Pearse Street) in Dublin, Ireland. She was the daughter of John Benvenutus Valentine Coffey, a landowner, weigh-master, cattle exporter and bookmaker and Ellie Gwendoline Coffey (née McCall, first cousin of poet and songwriter P.J. McCall), who owned The Royal Arms in Kilcullen. Her family homes included Larch Hill, Tibradden, and Venetian Hall, Howth Road (both in Dublin, and both Georgian mansions have since been demolished). Her early education was at the Cross and Passion College, Kildare. Her paternal grandfather William Coffey was Lord Mayor of Dublin from 1909 to 1910, an Alderman, High Sheriff and ex-officio Privy Councillor. During her childhood, Victoria—known to friends as "Vikki"— won numerous medals for her musical performances. She played the piano and cello, and trained as a singer under instruction from Vincent O'Brien.

Coffey had 10 siblings. Her younger sister Dr. Pauline (married names Keating and Mansell) also became a doctor, chief medical officer in the south of England, and won prestigious awards from the Meath Hospital and Royal College of Surgeons. Five of Coffey's siblings died as children—four in infancy. According to Coffey's grand-nephew Robert Coffey, "that was one of the main reasons she was so motivated to learn about the health of newborns and young children". He described her as "a no-nonsense person but with quite a wicked sense of humour". She helped raise for the Dominican mission (now the Dublin Christian Mission), with which her brother Cecil (Fr. Louis Coffey O.P., Provincial of the Dominican Order in Ireland and founder of the moving crib exhibition in Dublin, and the St. Martin de Porres magazine) was associated. She survived polio in 1955.

== Education and career ==
Coffey was known for her diligence and hard work. At the age of 25, she qualified for the RCSI, where she graduated with a licentiate degree and a degree in midwifery from the conjoint board of the RCSI. Seven years later, in 1943, she earned a DPH diploma in Children's Health at the RCSI.

She developed strong qualities of leadership, responsibility, and pugnacious personality by working with men such as Tom Lane, Henry Stokes and Oliver St. John Gogarty at Meath Hospital, the cradle of the Dublin School of Medicine, where she was a student and house officer. In the same year, she served as a clinical clerk at Coombe Hospital for Women. Shortly afterwards, she was appointed as a medical officer in St Kevin's Hospital due to her knowledge of obstetrics. At St. Kevin's Hospital, Coffey became interested in the neglected field of congenital birth defects and began a publishing career. She was motivated to learn about the health of babies and young children, and focused on paediatrics.

Coffey's first paper, which she wrote in 1953, is about syphilis in children. Her research mainly focused on children born with congenital and metabolic diseases, and was completed with the help of the Medical Research Council, Trinity College Dublin and Professor Jessop of Meath Hospital. She then began to research sudden infant death syndrome (SIDS), and was one of the first women to study it. Her numerous publications covered most aspects of congenital disorders. In 1954, Coffey gave a paper on this topic at the Royal Academy of Medicine in Ireland.

Coffey published her findings in the Irish Journal of Medical Science between 1955 and 1959. In recognition of her work in paediatrics, she was appointed lecturer in teratology at Trinity College Dublin in 1961, earning a Ph.D. from Trinity College in 1965 for a thesis on the incidence and aetiology of congenital defects in Ireland. She published internationally and maintained her research output for several years after her retirement. Coffey founded the Faculty of Paediatrics at the RCPI in 1981 and was the first female president of the Irish Paediatric Society.

== Later life and legacy ==
Coffey lived on Cowper Road in Rathmines, a suburb of Dublin, with her parents before their deaths, and remained there until her own death. She died at 87 on 15 June 1999 in St. James's Hospital, where she had worked most of her life. She is buried in Glasnevin Cemetery, Dublin.

On International Women's Day in 2018, Coffey was honoured for her outstanding contribution to medicine and was chosen to be part of "Women on Walls", an arts project hosted by RCSI in partnership with Accenture, with her portrait displayed in the RCSI's principal boardroom.
