= Adelaide Hospital (Dublin) =

- Health Service Executive
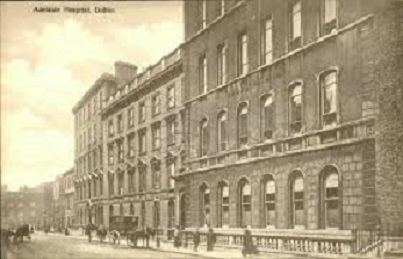
- Adelaide Hospital in Peter Street

- Shown in Dublin

Geography
- Location: Dublin, Ireland
- Coordinates: 53.3393°N 6.2682°W

Organisation
- Type: General hospital

History
- Founded: 1839
- Closed: 1998

Links
- Lists: Hospitals in the Republic of Ireland

The Adelaide Hospital (Irish: Ospidéal Adelaide) was a general and teaching hospital in No 22 to 28 Peter Street, Dublin, Ireland. It was absorbed into the Tallaght Hospital in June 1998.

== History ==
The hospital was originally named Adelaide Institution & Protestant Hospital. Its first premises was at 43 Bride Street and it continued there until 1846. It was then closed for a time and, after new funding was secured, re-opened in Peter Street in 1858, close to two existing schools of medicine. One of these, the Ledwich School, was incorporated into the hospital in 1894. The founder of the Sunbeam House, Lucinda Sullivan, served as the first lady superintendent of the hospital from 1872 to 1875.

Fetherstonhaugh House in Rathgar, designed by architect George P. Beater (1850-1928) in 1894, was built as a Convalescent Home for the Adelaide Hospital. In 1961 the Church of Ireland RCB purchased the home for its clerical training, and the Divinity Hostel, moved there in 1964.

The Adelaide hospital was a general teaching hospital for many years and in the forefront of medical advances. Its charter, which was one of the last royal charters granted in Ireland, dates from 1920.

When the Irish Hospitals' Sweepstake was set up in 1930 to finance hospitals, the Adelaide was the only hospital at the time not to accept money from the Hospitals Trust, as the governors disapproved of sweepstakes.

It was absorbed into the Tallaght Hospital in June 1998. The former hospital building in Peter Street has been converted into apartments and office suites known as Adelaide Chambers.

== Notable staff ==
Among the notable staff who have been associated with the Adelaide Hospital are:

- Dr William Alexander Gillespie (1912–2003), started his career as house officer in the hospital and returned as a consultant in 1977. He had an international reputation in the field of hospital infections.
- Minnie Pamela Hill, (1870– ), Matron 1911 – until her marriage in 1925. Hill trained at The London Hospital under Matron Eva Luckes from 1903 to 1905. She remained there as a Holiday Sister, Pupil Midwife, and Ward Sister until 1909. She was a member of the Irish Matrons Association.
- Dr James Little (1837–1916), physician to the hospital for a period of 46 years until shortly before his death. He served as President of the Royal College of Physicians of Ireland from 1886 to 1888 and Regius Professor of Physic (Dublin) from 1898 to 1916.
- Dr Richard Dancer Purefoy (1847–1919), was Obstetrical Surgeon in the hospital for 21 years. He became President of the Royal College of Surgeons in Ireland and one of the leading obstetricians and gynaecologists in Ireland.
- Dr Sir Henry Swanzy (1843–1913) was a distinguished eye specialist and ophthalmic surgeon to the hospital.
- Dr Ella Webb (1877–1946), appointed anaesthetist in 1918, was the first female member of the staff. She immediately established a dispensary for sick children in the hospital. She became an MD in 1925 and then worked with Kathleen Lynn in St. Ultan's hospital which Lynn had founded.

== Sources ==
- Fleetwood, John F (1983). The History of Medicine in Ireland. Dublin: Skellig Press. ISBN 978-0946241026.
- Mitchell, David (1990). The Adelaide Hospital, Dublin, 1838-1989. Dublin: the Blackwater Press. ISBN 0-905471-16-4.
