= List of knights bachelor appointed in 1903 =

Knight Bachelor is the oldest and lowest-ranking form of knighthood in the British honours system; it is the rank granted to a man who has been knighted by the monarch but not inducted as a member of one of the organised orders of chivalry. Women are not knighted; in practice, the equivalent award for a woman is appointment as Dame Commander of the Order of the British Empire (founded in 1917).

In 1903, 58 people were appointed Knights Bachelor.

== Knights bachelor appointed in 1903 ==
Source: William A. Shaw, The Knights of England, vol. 2 (London: Sherratt and Hughes, 1906), pp. 414–417.

Date	Name	Notes
1 January 1903	Montagu Cornish Turner	
1 January 1903	George Watt	
1 January 1903	William Ovens Clark	
1 January 1903	Lt-Col. James Lewis Walker	
17 April 1903	James Acworth Davies	Judge of the High Court of Judicatue, Fort St George
18 April 1903	Lt-Col. William Earnshaw Cooper, CIE	Commandant, Cawnpore Volunteer Rifles
20 April 1903	Hurkisondas Nurrotumdas	Sheriff of Bombay
12 May 1903	Col. Robert Cranston	Treasurer of the City of Edinburgh
12 May 1903	William John Menzies, WS	Agent of the Church of Scotland
12 May 1903	James Guthrie	President of the Royal Scottish Academy
14 May 1903	John Shearer	Convenor of the Parks and Galleries Committee of the Corporation of Glasgow
18 July 1903	Patrick Heron Watson, LLD, MD, FRSE	Hon. Surgeon to the King in Scotland
18 July 1903	Alfred Downing Fripp	Surgeon-in-Ordinary to the King
18 July 1903	Stephen MacKenzie, MD	
18 July 1903	Hiram Shaw Wilkinson	Chief Justice of the Supreme Court for China and Corea
18 July 1903	William Alfred Felder	Mayor of Hull
18 July 1903	Alfred Arnold	
18 July 1903	Henry Fleming Hibbert	
18 July 1903	Francis Charles Gore	Solicitor to the Board of Inland Revenue
18 July 1903	George Collard	Mayor of Canterbury
18 July 1903	Edwin Cooper Perry, MD, FRCP	Physician to Guy's Hospital
18 July 1903	Alexander Carmichael Bruce	Assistant Commissioner of Police of the Metropolis
18 July 1903	John Johnson Runtz	First Mayor of Stoke Newington
18 July 1903	William Godsell	
18 July 1903	George Thomas Lambert	Formerly Director of Greenwich Hospital
18 July 1903	Lewis Tonna Dibdin, DCL	Dean of the Arches
18 July 1903	Charles Samuel Bagot	Formerly a Legal Commissioner in Lunacy
18 July 1903	Charles Petrie	Formerly Lord Mayor of Liverpool
3 August 1903	The Hon. Charles Abercrombie Smith, MA	Formerly Controller and Auditor-General of the Colony of the Cape of Good Hope
4 August 1903	Charles Peter Layard	Chief Justice of Ceylon
5 August 1903	Charles John Dudgeon	Chairman of the Shanghai Branch of the China Association
26 August 1903	Eyre Coote	High Sheriff of County Dublin
26 August 1903	Robert Anderson	High Sheriff of Belfast
26 August 1903	Abraham Sutton	High Sheriff of Cork
26 August 1903	Thomas Brown	Chairman of Kingstown Urban District Council
26 August 1903	James Carroll	Chairman of Queenstown Urban District Council
26 August 1903	James O'Donohoe	Chairman of the Galway Urban District Council
26 August 1903	Lambert Hepenstal Ormsby, MD	President of the Royal College of Surgeons in Ireland
26 August 1903	Augustine FitzGerald Baker	President of the Incorporated Law Society of Ireland
9 November 1903	Alan Reeve Manby, MD	Surgeon-Apothecary to the King's Household at Sandringham and to the Prince of Wales
30 November 1903	Francis Bathurst Suttor	President of the Legislative Council of the State of New South Wales
1 December 1903	Edward Dundas Holroyd	Puisne Judge of the Supreme Court of the State of Victoria
18 December 1903	Thomas William Snagge	County Court Judge
18 December 1903	John George Craggs	
18 December 1903	Charles Holroyd	Keeper of the National Gallery of British Art, Tate Gallery
18 December 1903	August Manns	
18 December 1903	Henry Alexander Giffard, KC	Bailiff of Guernsey
18 December 1903	John Macdonell	Master of the Supreme Court
18 December 1903	Henry Katz Davson	
18 December 1903	Ernest Flower, MD	
18 December 1903	Professor Clement Le Neve Foster, DSc, FRS	Formerly one of HM Inspectors of Mines
18 December 1903	Nathaniel Nathan	
18 December 1903	Alfred James Reynolds	Sheriff of the City of London
18 December 1903	Robert Kennaway Douglas	of the British Museum
18 December 1903	Harry Simon Samuel, MP	
18 December 1903	Charles Scarisbrick, JP	
18 December 1903	William Henry Venables-Vernon	Bailiff of Jersey
18 December 1903	Arthur Vernon Macan, MB	President of the Royal College of Physicians of Ireland
