= Arthur Foot (disambiguation) =

Arthur Foot (1901–1968) was an English schoolmaster, educationalist and academic.

Arthur Foot or Foote may also refer to:

- Arthur Wynne Foot (1838–1900), Irish doctor, professor of medicine, and an entomologist
- Arthur Foote (1853–1937), American classical composer
- Arthur De Wint Foote (1849–1933), American civil engineer and entrepreneur
- Arthur E. Foote (1874–1946), American tennis player
