= Arthur Wynne (disambiguation) =

Arthur Wynne (1871–1945) was the British-born inventor of the modern crossword puzzle. Arthur Wynne may also refer to:

- Arthur Wynne (British Army officer) (1846–1936), British general
- Arthur Beavor Wynne (1837–1906), Anglo-Irish geologist

== See also ==
- Arthur Wynn (1910–2001), British civil servant, social researcher, and recruiter of Soviet spies for the KGB
- Arthur Wynne Foot (1838–1900), Irish doctor, professor of medicine, and entomologist
- John Arthur Wynne (1801–1865), Irish landowner and politician
