= Christopher Robinson (Irish judge) =

18th-century Irish judge and barrister

Christopher Robinson (1712–1787) was an Irish barrister and judge, who for many years was the senior ordinary judge of the Irish courts of common law. He is best remembered for giving the adventurer Francis Higgins the nickname "The Sham Squire", and for his impressive collection of legal textbooks, which forms the basis of the Library of the King's Inns.

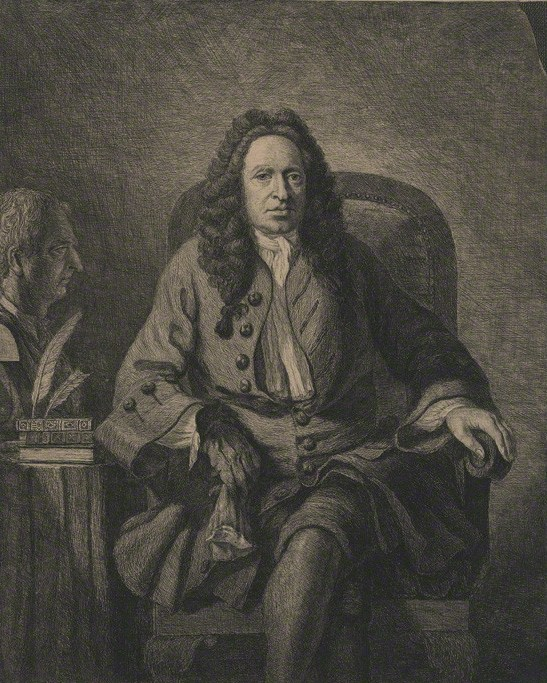
Bryan Robinson, 1750 engraving by Benjamin Wilson (painter)

== Early career ==
He was born in Dublin, eldest son of Bryan Robinson (1689–1754), Regius Professor of Physic at Trinity College Dublin and President of the Royal College of Physicians of Ireland, and his wife Mary. The Robinson family came originally from Clapham, North Yorkshire. He had two brothers, one of whom, Robert, became a doctor, and like his father was elected President of the Royal College of Physicians of Ireland. Christopher was tutored at home, and matriculated from the University of Dublin in 1729. He entered Lincoln's Inn in 1732, was called to the Bar in 1737, and took silk in 1745. He acted on occasion as an extra judge of assize. Though a man of strong opinions he seems to have had no interest in politics as such, and never sat in the Irish Parliament.

== Judge ==
He was appointed a judge of the Court of King's Bench (Ireland) in 1758 and served on the Court until his death almost thirty years later. His appointment was said to be a reward for writing pamphlets supporting the Government.

His most celebrated trial was that of the notorious confidence trickster Francis Higgins ("the Sham Squire") in 1767 for a serious assault on his mother-in-law, Mrs. Archer. It was Robinson at the trial who first used the sobriquet "Sham Squire", which stuck. Higgins served a prison sentence for the assault, but this was only a brief check to his remarkable career, which saw him becoming an attorney, a justice of the peace and an informer for the Dublin Castle administration.

Robinson was also seneschal of St. Patrick's Cathedral, Dublin.

== Family ==
He married Elizabeth Martin, daughter of the Reverend Hartstonge Martin of Cashel, County Tipperary and his wife Susan Wemyss, in 1758, and had one surviving son, also named Christopher, who became a clergyman, and served as rector of Granard, County Longford. The younger Christopher married Elizabeth Langrishe, daughter of the leading politician Sir Hercules Langrishe, 1st Baronet and his wife Hannah Myhill, and had several children, including Hercules, an Admiral, who was the father of Hercules Robinson, 1st Baron Rosmead , and Sir Bryan Robinson, who was a judge like his grandfather, based in Newfoundland.

== Character ==
His seniority on the Bench made him a public figure of some importance, but he was never popular. He had strong and sometimes controversial political opinions: in particular he opposed full independence for the Parliament of Ireland, which was a cause dear to the hearts of Henry Grattan and his Irish Patriot Party. It may be relevant that through the long reign of George II of Great Britain, he was the only future Irish judge who never sat in the Irish House of Commons. On account of his political opinions, he was savagely attacked by pamphleteers, notably by Robert Johnson, a future High Court judge, who eventually destroyed his own career by anonymous attacks on his judicial colleagues and other officials. Robinson himself was accused of writing vicious and scurrilous anonymous pamphlets, but Elrington Ball judges this to be unlikely. These attacks seriously damaged his reputation, and as late as the 1860s a biography of "The Sham Squire" repeated many unflattering stories about Robinson, which appear to have originated in his lifetime. His manner was acerbic (one pamphlet refers to his "sarcastic sneer"), and he was notoriously morose. On the other hand, Ball argues that his charges to Dublin grand juries show him to have been both intelligent and humane. As a judge, he was noted for strict adherence to the letter of the law. On a more human note, he was noted for his fear of thunderstorms, a fear which he said was best alleviated by good claret.

== Library ==
He amassed a large collection of legal textbooks; after his death his son, Christopher, having no use for them, put them up for sale. The Benchers of the King's Inns bought most of the collection, and this formed the basis of the King's Inns Library.

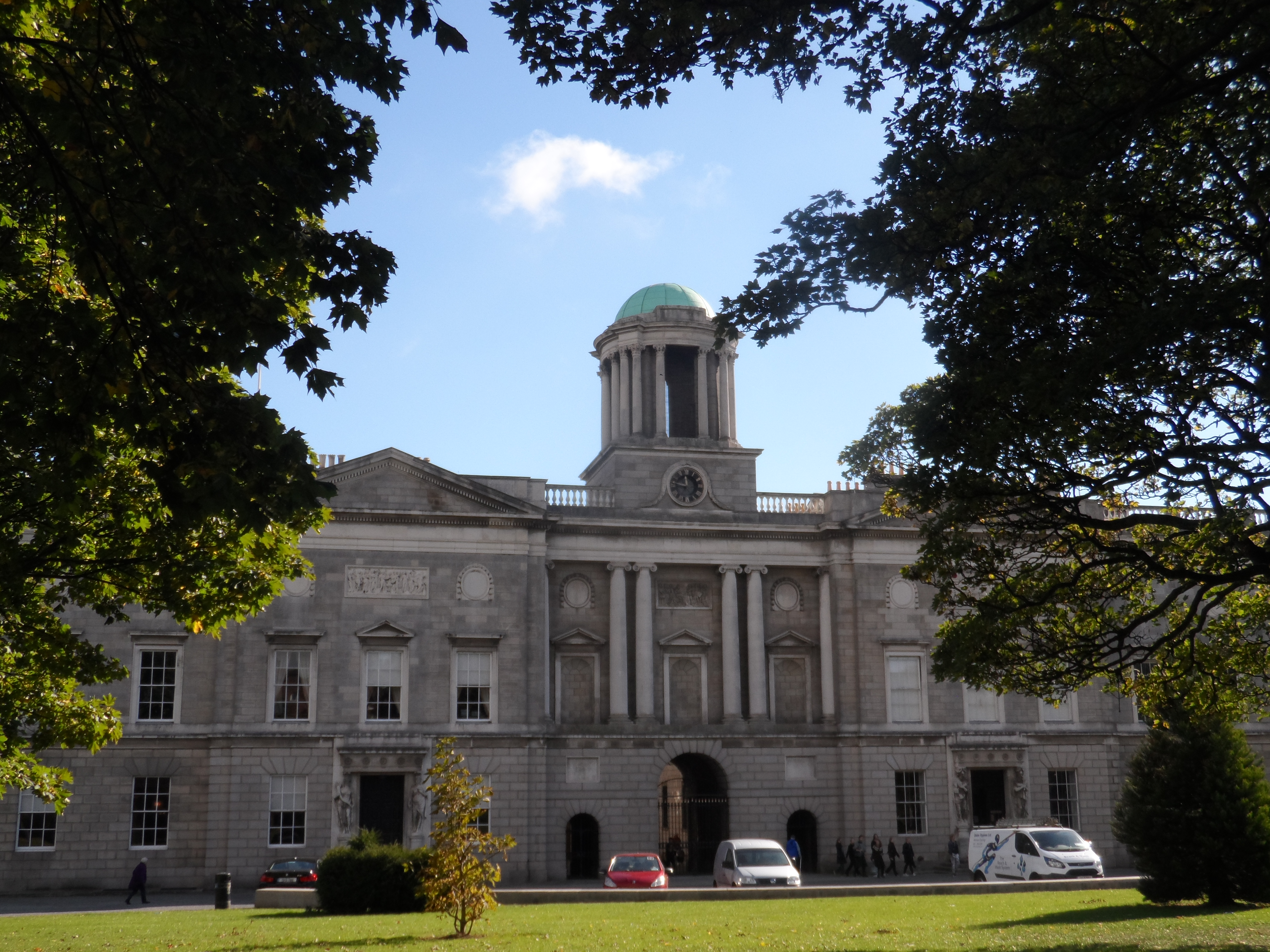
The Kings Inns- Robinson's collection of textbooks, which the Benchers bought in 1788, formed the basis of the Inns library
