= Dublin Molecular Medicine Centre =

Irish charity

Dublin Molecular Medicine Centre (DMMC) was a charity set up in 2002, to create critical mass in molecular medicine research in Dublin, Ireland. Funding was provided by the Higher Education Authority.

== Resources ==
The academic resources supporting the teaching hospitals include:

- UCD Conway Institute of Biomolecular & Biomedical Research which is organised into 3 interactive multi-disciplinary centres : synthesis and chemical biology; integrative biology and molecular medicine.
- RCSI Research Institute whose portfolio included cellular neuroscience, molecular research, advanced drug delivery, proteomics and pharmacy.
- TCD Institute of Molecular Medicine focuses on cancer (prostate, haematological, esophageal, cervical, thoracic), infection and immunity (tuberculosis); genomic research into inflammatory disease, molecular histopathology, cell signalling, neuropsychiatric genetics and nutrigenomics.

== New Clinical Research Centre ==
DMMC secured funding from the Wellcome Trust for a major clinical research centre to be led by Professor Dermot P. Kelleher for Dublin comprising two elements:

- A new research centre at St. James's Hospital, Dublin.
- A network of new clinical research facilities linking the proposed new centre to existing centres at Beaumont Hospital, Dublin, St. Vincent’s University Hospital Dublin and Mater Misericordiae University Hospital

== Successor ==
Dublin Molecular Medicine Centre evolved to become Molecular Medicine Ireland which was established in 2008.
