= James Little (physician) =

Irish medical practitioner (1837–1916)

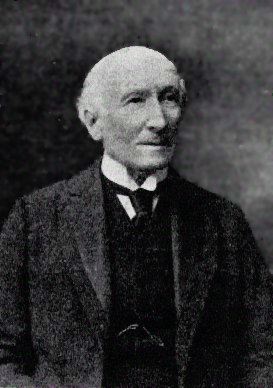
Little, c. 1890

James Little (21 January 1837 – 23 December 1916) was an Irish medical practitioner. After spending an early part of his career as a ship's surgeon, surviving a shipwreck, he became chief physician at the Adelaide Hospital in Dublin and Regius Professor of Physic at Trinity College Dublin.

== Early life ==
Little was born in Newry, the son of Archibald Little and his wife Mary, daughter of Richard Coulter. He was educated first at The Academy, Cookstown, County Tyrone and afterwards at The Royal School, Armagh. On leaving school, he became apprenticed to John Cohan, physician to the Armagh Fever Hospital and was also a pupil of Alexander Robinson, surgeon to the Armagh County Infirmary. In his diary, now held in the library of the Royal College of Physicians of Ireland (RCPI), he records the decision to enter the medical profession:

1853 – for some years past my attention has been directed to the medical profession – I now quietly sat down and made up my mind to go to it – a family council was held & the best bargain made for me to go to Dr. Cohan as an apprentice – so I went over to Armagh and was installed as his apprentice – I should certainly not have had the courage to do so were it but that it had already been agreed that he was to allow me to go to Dublin in the following November and I hope that Aunt's kindness will make the nine months bearable.

In November 1853, he entered the School of the Royal College of Surgeons in Ireland (RCSI), attending the hospital practice of the Royal City of Dublin Hospital, and also the clinics at the Whitworth and Richmond Hospitals. In 1856, he obtained the diploma of Licentiate of the RCSI (L.R.C.S.I.) After he qualified, he was placed in charge of the Armagh County Infirmary, under Robinson and James Cuming, the then leading physician of Belfast.

== Ship's surgeon ==
From March 1857, he spent three years as ship's surgeon with P&O, on voyages to and from India. His first voyage left Southampton on 20 March 1857, on board the SS Vera, bound for Calcutta. In the diary, Little records his experience as a ship surgeon and the long periods of unemployment where he lived at the Officers Club in Calcutta.

In February 1858, he set sail from Calcutta, on board the SS Ava en route for Suez; the ship was carrying several refugees from the Indian rebellion, including Lady Julia Inglis, daughter of Frederic Thesiger, 1st Baron Chelmsford and the wife of Major-General Sir John Eardley Inglis, who commanded the British troops at the Siege of Lucknow. After calling at Madras on 13 February, the Ava departed for Suez; her captain, Captain Kirton, had been instructed to land at Trincomalee with about £5,000 of Government treasure. Unfortunately, Kirton steered a course which took the boat onto rocks off Pigeon Island, about 12 miles from Trincomalee.

Little's diary records his experience during the shipwreck, describing spending a night in an open boat before landing on shore the next morning. He then spent some time in a tent on the beach while the crew attempted to recover what they could from the wreck.

== Later career ==
After spending three years with P & O, Little returned to Ireland and studied at the University of Edinburgh where he obtained his M.D. in 1861. He then spent two years in private practice in Lurgan followed by a year of post-graduate study on the Continent, after which he moved to Dublin, where he set up a medical practice. For many years he enjoyed an enormous and lucrative practice, and was described as "the favourite consultant in all quarters of Ireland".

In Dublin, he became closely associated with Alfred Hudson (1808–1880), who recognised Little's ability and was instrumental in his being appointed physician to the Adelaide Hospital, where he was a clinical teacher for a period of forty-six years until shortly before his death. (In 1882, Little presented an address to students on the inauguration of the Hudson Scholarship at the Adelaide Hospital.)

He soon gained a reputation for his teaching, and was described as a "brilliant and attractive lecturer on the practice of medicine". He became chairman at the Ledwich School of Medicine and later he was Professor of Medicine at the Royal College of Surgeons in Ireland (RCSI) from 1872 to 1883 .

In 1896, he was one of the delegates at a meeting with the Chief Secretary for Ireland, Gerald Balfour, at Dublin Castle to discuss the grievances of Irish Poor-law medical officers.

== Publications ==
In 1868, he was appointed editor of the Dublin Quarterly Journal of Medical Science. As editor, Little introduced a series of half-yearly reports on the progress in various branches of medicine, including Medicine, Surgery, Hygiene, Therapeutics and Obstetrics. These reports now provide a very valuable summary of the history of developments in the respective branches of medicine. From January 1872, Little changed the journal from a quarterly to a monthly publication under the title, Dublin Journal of Medical Science. His tenure as editor ended in 1875, when he was replaced by John William Moore.

Although he published no major works, Little contributed to various medical journals. In May 1885, he published an essay "On the form of pneumonia prevalent in Dublin" in the Transactions of the Royal Academy of Medicine in Ireland, which was reprinted in the Dublin Journal of Medical Science in September 1885.

== Appointments and honours ==
In 1877, he was present at the inaugural meeting in Dublin which established the Dublin branch of the British Medical Association, proposing a resolution in favour of the project.

In 1897 he was appointed Crown nominee for Ireland on the General Medical Council. He took an active part in its proceedings and at one point came close to being elected as the President of its council.

He was an active member of the Royal College of Physicians of Ireland, serving in several offices, including two years as Registrar of the college; "in all matters of difficulty his wise counsels were highly esteemed by the College". He served as President of the college for two years from 1886 to 1888, and "steered its course with unfailing dignity, hospitality, and consummate tact". He also served as President of The Royal Academy of Medicine in Ireland.

In 1898, he succeeded Sir John Banks, K.C.B., as Regius Professor of Physic in Trinity College Dublin, retaining this office until his death, taking a prominent part in the conduct of the Final Examinations in Medicine.

In 1900, during the visit of Queen Victoria to Dublin, Little escorted her daughter, Princess Christian, around the Adelaide Hospital.

When the Association of Physicians of Great Britain and Ireland held its annual meeting in Dublin in 1909, Little occupied the position of president.

He also took a prominent part in the celebrations held in 1912 to commemorate the bicentenary of the Medical School of Trinity College Dublin.

He was awarded the honorary degrees of M.D.(Hon.Causa) from the University of Dublin and (in 1901) LL.D.(Hon.Causa) from the University of Edinburgh, and was appointed "Honorary Physician-In-Ordinary to H.M. The King in Ireland".

== Personal life ==
In 1872, he married Anna, daughter of Robert Murdoch, who predeceased him in 1914. They had three children, two sons and a daughter.

He was a member of several Gentlemen's clubs, including the Dublin University Club, the Friendly Brothers of St. Patrick, and the Kildare Street Club in Dublin, and the Junior Carlton and the Athenaeum in London.

== Death ==
In July 1916, he began to have health difficulties and after six months of gradually failing health and strength, he died of heart failure on 23 December 1916, shortly before his eightieth birthday.

== Tributes ==
In Little's obituary, published in the British Medical Journal in January 1917, his close friend Walter G. Smith said:

In sum, there have been greater and more illustrious physicians, but none who excelled, and few who equalled, James Little in gaining the esteem and affection of his friends and patients, and his memory will ever be cherished by all who knew him. He was, in truth, the "beloved physician", and his motto with his patients was:

Aegroto dum anima est, spes est.

In January 1922, six years after his death, a bronze plaque with a portrait in bas-relief was erected in the Entrance Hall of the Royal College of Physicians of Ireland by the Members and Fellows. The plaque, the work of Oliver Sheppard, R.H.A., was unveiled on 17 January in the presence of a "large and distinguished company", with the President of the College, Sir James Craig, in the chair. At the unveiling, the Provost of Trinity spoke of "the respect and esteem in which Trinity College had ever held its professor of physic", and said that Little was "a good man as well as a great physician".
