= Marsh baronets =

Extinct baronetcy in the Baronetage of the United Kingdom

The Marsh Baronetcy, of Dublin, was created in the Baronetage of the United Kingdom in 1839 for Irish physician and surgeon Henry Marsh. The title became extinct on the death of the second Baronet on 27 May 1868.

== Marsh baronets, of Dublin (1839) ==
- Sir Henry Marsh, 1st Baronet (1790–1860)
- Sir Henry Marsh, 2nd Baronet (1821–1868)
