= William Clement (academic) =

Irish academic

- Born: 1707; Carrickmacross, County Monaghan, Ireland
- Died: 15 January 1782 (aged 74–75)

Academic background
- Education: Trinity College Dublin

Academic work
- Institutions: Trinity College Dublin

William Clement (1707 – 15 January 1782) was an Irish academic who spent his whole career at Trinity College Dublin (TCD), teaching botany, natural philosophy, mathematics and medicine there. He was the third Erasmus Smith's Professor of Natural and Experimental Philosophy at TCD (1745-1759).

== Life and career ==
William Clement was born in Carrickmacross, County Monaghan, son of merchant Thomas Clement. He matriculated at TCD on 28 April 1722 at the age of 14. He was a Scholar in 1724 and received BA (1726) and, MA (1731). He was elected a Fellow in 1733, and later took medical degrees MB (1747), MD (1748). He was appointed Lecturer in Botany (1733), Erasmus Smith's Professor of Natural and Experimental Philosophy (1745–1759), Donegall Lecturer in Mathematics (1750–1759), and Regius Professor of Physic (1761–1781). He also served as Vice-Provost. Clement was MP for Dublin University from 1761 to 1768; and then for Dublin City until 1776.
