= Crampton baronets =

Extinct baronetcy in the Baronetage of the United Kingdom

Escutcheon of the Crampton baronets of Merrion Square

The Crampton baronetcy, of Merrion Square, in the City of Dublin, was a title in the Baronetage of the United Kingdom. It was created on 14 March 1839 for the Irish surgeon and anatomist Philip Crampton. He was succeeded by his son, the second baronet, who was a prominent diplomat. The title became extinct on the latter's death in 1886.

== Crampton baronets, of Merrion Square, Dublin (1839) ==
- Sir Philip Crampton, 1st Baronet (1777–1858)
- Sir John Fiennes Twisleton Crampton, 2nd Baronet (1805–1886)
