= John Thomas Banks =

Sir John Thomas Banks KCB FRCPI
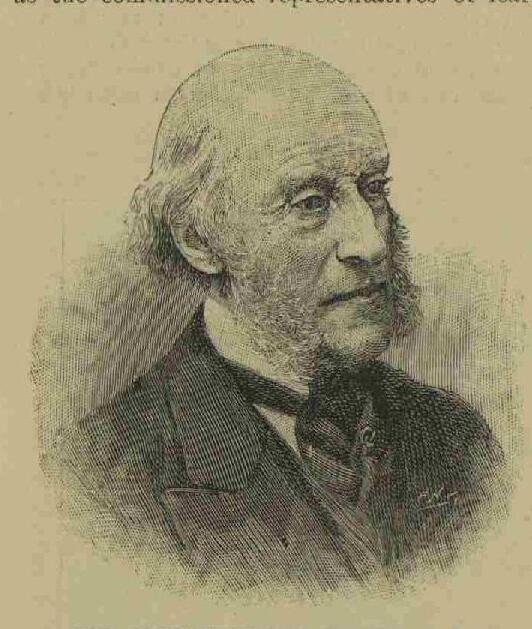
- Born: 14 October 1816; London, England
- Died: 16 April 1908 (aged 91); 45 Merrion Square, Dublin
- Burial place: Mount Jerome cemetery, Dublin
- Occupation: Regius Professor of Physic (professor of medicine)
- Spouse: Alicia Wright Banks
- Children: 3
- Parent(s): Percival Banks; Mary Ramsay Banks

Sir John Thomas Banks KCB FRCPI (14 October 1816 – 16 July 1908) was an Anglo-Irish physician and, between 1880 and 1898, Regius Professor of Physic at Trinity College, Dublin.

== Life ==
=== Provenance ===
Although born in London, Banks lived and worked in Ireland, then part of the United Kingdom: he would during his lifetime have been identified as a member of the Anglo-Irish class. His elder brother Percival Weldon Banks (d. 1850) later achieved minor notability as a barrister and, using the pseudonym "Morgan Rattler", a writer.

Born directly after the Great War (as the international hostilities of the preceding 22 years were known at the time), he was the second son of Percival Banks (1764–1848) by his marriage to Mary Ramsay. John Thomas Banks came from a line of physicians. His father worked as a surgeon in Ennis, following an earlier career as a ships' surgeon. His grandfather (who died only in 1848), was also called Percival Banks, and worked in Ennis as a doctor. The mother of John Thomas Banks, born Mary Ramsay, was the daughter of one army captain and the sister of another, reflecting the militarisation of society in Europe during the early years of the nineteenth century.

=== Early years ===
Banks started to study at the Royal College of Surgeons during the 1830s. There he was taught by Sir Henry Marsh. He received his practicing licence from the Royal College in 1836. He became a licentiate of the Dublin-based King and Queen's College of Physicians in 1841 and a fellow of it in 1844. He also undertook a parallel academic career at Trinity College, Dublin where he started in 1833, graduating four years later. His studies here included both Medicine and the Arts more generally. Trinity awarded him a Doctorate of Medicine in 1843 or 1844.

=== Professional advancement ===
In 1840 Banks took on a medical lectureship at Dublin's Park Street school of medicine. Two years later he was given a lectureship on "Practice of Medicine" at the Carmichael school of medicine. In 1843 he was appointed a physician at The Richmond, Whitworth and Hardwicke Hospitals in Dublin Eminent colleagues included Dominic Corrigan and Robert Adams. In the words of one authority, "there was hardly a hospital in the city with which he did not hold some sort of position as consultant". Banks sustained his own professional association with these Dublin hospitals for the rest of his life. He took a post as assistant physician with the Richmond Lunatic Asylum, promoted to the level of "physician" there in 1854. Some years later he also became a consulting physician with the Royal City of Dublin Hospital.

Sources place stress on his accomplishment both as a physician and as a teacher. In 1849 he was made a "King's Professor" in the "Practice of Medicine" at Trinity College. A physician post at the Royal College's Sir Patrick Dun's Hospital went with the professorship. After resigning from these posts in 1868 Banks retained his links with this hospital as a consultant physician.

=== Eminence ===
Banks was evidently gregarious and a natural networker. He served between 1869 and 1871 as the president of the King and Queen's College of Physicians in Ireland (as the "Royal College" was then known). He also served a term, in 1861, as president of the Dublin Pathological Society. There was unanimity with regard to his appointment as the first president of the Royal Academy of Medicine in Ireland when it was established in 1882, and he also presided over the British Medical Association when, in 1887, it convened in Dublin. Banks was elected Regius Professor of Physic at Trinity College, Dublin in 1880, a post which in the end he held till 1898. He was "physician in ordinary" in Ireland to the Queen (and subsequently to King Edward), though this was presumably something of a sinecure given the Queen's refusal to visit Dublin for many years because of various perceived marks of disrespect on the part of the Dublin Corporation. Banks became increasingly notable as a distinguished leader in Ireland of the medical establishment, turning down a knighthood in 1883: later he nevertheless accepted a KCB (a superior class of knighthood) in 1889.

== Contribution and legacy ==
Banks was an influential proponent of improved standards in medical education, arguing strongly for a higher level of education for aspiring medical student before they embarked on their medical studies. He was one of those who urged extending the study period for medical students from four to five years. This in part reflected his success, with others, in bringing mental illness more into the mainstream of the medical curriculum.

His published contribution to medical research was modest, however, especially in view of the academic promise and "brilliance" evident in research papers from his younger days, as a result of which he could be described as a "recognised authority on typhus" and on "diseases of the brain". One source attributes the absence of significant published output from his middle and later years to his "busy social life", pointing out that he was a "noted conversationalist", famous for his "princely hospitality". It is also the case that by the time he died it was clear that he suffered badly from sight loss, although this did not impair "his social activity".

One article by Banks that did attract notice was entitled "De lunatico inquirendo", published in the "Irish Journal of Medical Science" in 1868. It was concerned with the mental stability of the eighteenth century Anglo-Irish celebrity-satirist, Jonathan Swift, during that great man's final decades.

A medical scholarship which Banks endowed in 1906 at Trinity College, Dublin was still being awarded a century later, topped off with a "John Banks medal" in bronze. The medal continues to be listed among Trinity's "postgraduate scholarships of limited application" for 2015.

== Arms ==
Coat of arms of John Thomas Banks
Notes Granted 23 October 1893 by Arthur Edward Vicars, Ulster King of Arms. Crest A dragon's head erased per pale Sable and Gules. Escutcheon Per pale Sable and Gules on a cross between four fleurs-de-lis Argent five pheons Azure. Motto Fide Et Fortitudine
