= Victoria Balfe =

French noblewoman and singer

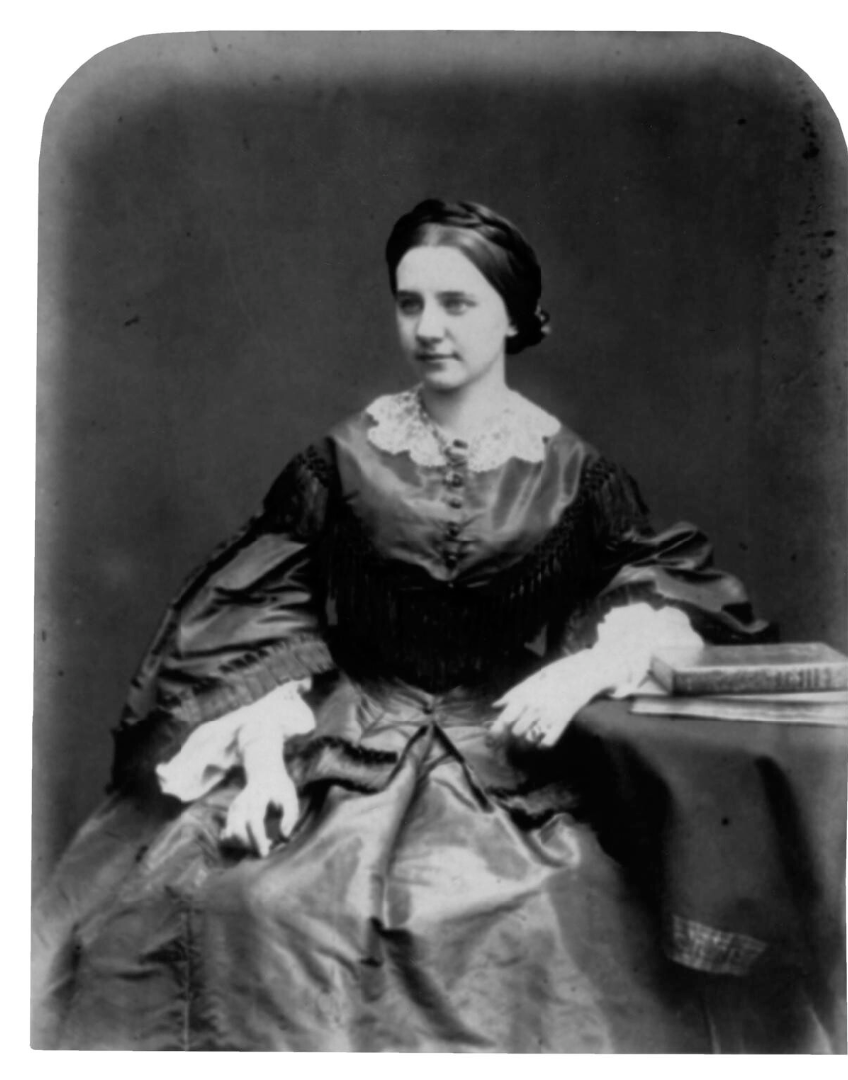
- Born: 1 September 1835 or 1837; Paris
- Died: 22 January 1871; Madrid
- Spouse(s): Sir John Crampton, 2nd Baronet, José Bernardino Fernández de Velasco
- Children: 3
- Parent(s): Michael William Balfe; Lina Roser

Victoria Balfe (1 September 1835 or 1837 – 22 January 1871) was a French noblewoman and singer.

Balfe was also known as Victoire Crampton and Victoire Fernández de Velasco, duchess of Frías. She was the second daughter of the composer Michael William Balfe and his wife, the singer Lina Roser. She was born in the rue de la Victoire, Paris. Her father trained her as a singer, and she studied the piano at the Paris Conservatoire. She later studied in London, with Sterndale Bennett and Manuel García, and in Italy. She first appeared in London under Frederick Gye's management at the Lyceum Theatre on 28 May 1857, as Amina in La sonnambula.

On 31 March 1860, she was married to Sir John Fiennes Twisleton Crampton, 2nd Baronet, the British minister to Russia. The marriage was annulled on her petition on 20 November 1863 on grounds of impotence. In 1864, she married José Bernardin Fernández de Velasco, duke of Frías, a grandee of Spain.

On 2 January 1871, she died in Madrid. She was buried in Burgos Cathedral, leaving behind three children.
