= Opsona Therapeutics =

- Founded: 1 January 2004
- Headquarters: Dublin, Republic of Ireland
- Website: www.opsona.com

Opsona Therapeutics was a drug development company specialising in the human immune system and new drugs and vaccines to prevent and treat autoimmune/inflammatory conditions, cancers and infectious diseases.

== History ==
Based in Ireland, Opsona was a spin-out from Trinity College Dublin (TCD). Ireland is ranked highly in the world in immunology research, and TCD has been at the forefront of the field.

Opsona's research was primarily focused on the role of Toll-like receptors (TLRs) and TLR signalling in human innate immunity. The company was founded in 2004 by three immunologistsincluding, Professor Luke O'Neill, Professor Kingston Mills, and Professor Dermot P. Kelleher.

The company went into liquidation in 2019 after unsuccessful clinical trials, and failure to find a buyer for OPN-305.

== Funding ==
Opsona's main investors were international and life-science focused and included:

- Inventages Venture Capital (Bahamas)
- Seroba Bioventures (Ireland)
- GenenFund (United States)
- Enterprise Ireland (Ireland)
