= Dawson-Damer family =

Anglo-Irish family

The Dawson-Damer family is an Anglo-Irish family whose descendants have been influential in politics, law, and business. They have strong connections to County Tipperary, County Laois, County Carlow, and Dublin in Ireland, as well as Dorset in England.

== Family tree ==
=== Dawson line ===
- William Henry Dawson, Viscount Carlow (b. 1712, d. 22 August 1779, m. Mary Damer, daughter of Joseph Damer)

=== Damer line ===
- Joseph D'Amory/Damer (m. 1570 to Jane St Loe, daughter of William St Loe)
  - Robert Damer (b. 1571, m. 1600 to Mary Colmer)
    - John Damer (b. 1602, m. 1628 to Elizabeth Maber)
      - Joseph Damer (b. 1630, d. 6 July 1720)
      - Edward Damer (b. 1633)
      - Jonathan Damer (b.1635)
      - Benjamin Damer (b. 1637)
      - Nathaniel (b. 1638)
      - Elizabeth (b. 1641, m. John Trevillian)
      - George Damer (b. 1644, d. 1730, m. Sarah Fowler)
        - John Damer (b. 1674, d. August 1768, m. 1724 to Margaret Roe, sister of James Roe (MP))
        - Joseph Damer (b. 1676, d. 1 March 1737, m. 9 December 1714 to Mary Churchill)
          - Mary Damer (b. 1 September 1715, d. 2 June 1769, m. William Henry Dawson, Viscount Carlow)
            - Mary Dawson (m. 1762 to Colonel Mervyn Archdall (senior))
          - Joseph Damer, 1st Earl of Dorchester (b. 12 March 1718, d. 12 January 1798, m. 27 July 1742 to Lady Caroline Sackville, daughter of Lionel Sackville, 1st Duke of Dorset)
            - John Damer (b. 25 June 1744, d. 15 August 1776, m. 14 June 1767 to Anne Seymour Damer, daughter of Henry Seymour Conway)
            - George Damer, 2nd Earl of Dorchester (b. 28 March 1746, d. 7 March 1808)
            - Lionel Damer (b. 16 September 1748, d. 28 May 1807, m. April 1778 to Williamsa Janssen, daughter of Theodore Janssen)
            - Caroline Damer (b. 23 April 1752)
          - Martha Damer (b. 23 April 1719, m. 17 June 1741 to Sir Edward Crofton, 4th Baronet, later m. 1 July 1747 to Dr Ezekiel Nesbitt)
          - John Damer (b. 27 October 1720, d. 1783, m. Martha Rush)
          - George Damer (b. 28 August 1727, d. 14 March 1752)
        - Elizabeth Damer (b.1684, m. 29 January 1717–8 to Edward Clavell)
  - Ambrose Damer (b. 1572)
