= William Coffey (Irish politician) =

Irish politician (1851–1937)

Lord Mayor of Dublin
- In office 1909–1910
- Preceded by: Gerald O'Reilly
- Succeeded by: Michael Doyle

Personal details
- Born: 26 January 1851 Dublin, Ireland
- Died: 2 February 1937 (aged 86) Dublin, Ireland
- Party: Irish Parliamentary Party
- Spouse: Annie Coffey
- Children: 11
- Relatives: Victoria Coffey (granddaughter)

William Coffey (26 January 1851 – 2 February 1937) was an Irish Parliamentary Party politician. He was a member of Dublin Corporation, and served as Sheriff of Dublin City from 1904 to 1905.

He was referred to in his role as lord mayor by James Joyce in the Lestrygonians section of Ulysses. Coffey served as Lord Mayor of Dublin from 1909 to 1910.

One of his grandchildren was the paediatrician Victoria Coffey.

Civic offices
Preceded by Gerald O'Reilly	Lord Mayor of Dublin; 1909–1910	Succeeded by Michael Doyle
