= Dermot P. Kelleher =

Canadian doctor

Dermot Kelleher FMedSci
- Website: www.med.ubc.ca/person/dermot-kelleher/
- Scientific career
- Institutions: University of British Columbia; Imperial College, London; Trinity College, Dublin
- Thesis: T-cell immunoregulation in Crohn's disease (1995)

Dermot P. Kelleher FMedSci is the Dean of the Faculty of Medicine and vice-president, Health at the University of British Columbia in Vancouver, Canada.

He moved to UBC in August 2015. He was subsequently appointed as UBC's inaugural vice-president, Health in June 2018. Previously Kelleher was Dean of the Faculty of Medicine at Imperial College London. He took up this role on 1 October 2012. From 2006 until 2012, he was Head of the School of Medicine and Vice-Provost for Medical Affairs at Trinity College, Dublin. He was one of the three founders of Opsona Therapeutics in 2004; Opsona's research is primarily focused on the role of toll-like receptors (TLRs) and TLR signalling in human innate immunity.

== Research and career ==
Kelleher's major interest is in the biology of the gastrointestinal immune system and in the interaction between this system and epithelial biology. Hence the research has direct implications for the study of inflammatory diseases of the gastrointestinal tract including coeliac disease and Helicobacter pylori (H. pylori) infection. The research projects within the group focus on the normal functioning of the T-lymphocyte and its role in intestinal inflammation. Gastrointestinal inflammation is under immunogenetic control and the genetics of coeliac disease are also a focus of the group. Specific research topics include:

- Signalling role of adhesion molecules on both peripheral and intestinal lymphocytes.
- Interactions between H. pylori and the gastrointestinal epithelium.
- Vaccine development for H. pylori infection. Immunogenetics of gastrointestinal and liver disease.

In 2004, he co-founded Opsona Therapeutics with Kingston Mills and Luke O'Neill.

In 2024, he was the eighth highest paid British Columbia public sector employee, with an income of CA$771,699.

=== Milestones ===
- Characterisation of biochemical mechanisms involved in integrin-mediated lymphocyte migration, a potential target for new therapeutic strategies.
- Identification of mechanisms whereby H. pylori protects itself from antibody attacks.
- Development and patenting of H. pylori vaccine, which has been licensed to Chiron Corporation.
- Characterisation of immunogenetics of Hepatitis C viral clearance.

=== Professional attachments ===
- Irish Society of Gastroenterology
- Irish Society for Immunology
- American Association for the Advancement of Science
- American Gastroenterological Association
- American Society for Biochemistry and Molecular Biology
- Biochemical Society
- Society for Mucosal Immunology
- Irish Association for Cancer Research
- Fellow, Royal College of Physicians of Ireland
- Fellow, Royal College of Physicians, London
- Fellow, Royal Academy of Medicine in Ireland
- Fellow of the Academy of Medical Sciences
- Director, Health Research Board, Ireland
