= Owen Smith (physician) =

Irish haematologist and academic

Owen Patrick Smith
- Born: 1958 or 1959 (age 67–68) (Note: In 2019, Smith was reported to be 60); Northside, Dublin
- Education: Trinity College Dublin
- Known for: stem cell transplantation
- Spouse: Jude
- Children: 3
- Scientific career
- Workplaces: Our Lady's Children's Hospital, Crumlin

Owen Patrick Smith CBE (born 1958/1959) is an Irish haematologist. He was the Regius Professor of Physic at Trinity College, Dublin between 2014 and 2020. He has also been Professor of Haematology at Trinity since 2002 and Professor of Paediatric and Adolescent Haematology at University College Dublin since 2015.

== Early life and education ==
Smith was born and raised on the Northside of Dublin, before beginning his education at Trinity College Dublin. As a child, Smith lost his cousin due to childhood leukaemia, which he says has inspired him to find a cure. He graduated from Trinity College, Dublin in 1980 and conducted his postgraduate training at the Royal Free Hospital.

== Career ==
While working at the Royal Free Hospital, Smith joined a six-month joint effort with the Great Ormond Street Hospital in stem cell transplantation. Upon its conclusion, he was offered a consultancy position but decline and accepted a job offer from the Harcourt Street Children's Hospital. In 1998, he received the Junior Chamber Ireland's National Outstanding Young Person of the Year Award in the area of Scientific Development.

In 2002, Smith was appointed Professor of Haematology at the Faculty of Medical and Dental Sciences at Trinity College Dublin. He was made an honorary fellow of Trinity College Dublin in 2009. He eventually became the Regius Professor of Physic at Trinity College, Dublin. In 2015, Smith received an honorary Order of the British Empire for his major contributions to Irish medicine.

== Research ==
Smith is a principal investigator at the National Children's Research Centre (NCRC), Crumlin, and Systems Biology Ireland, University College Dublin; his research focuses on the protein C activation pathway and the systemic inflammatory response syndrome.

In 2016, Smith was appointed the Ireland East Hospital Group (IEHG) Clinical Director of their Clinical Academic Directorate in Cancer (CADC). In this role, he oversaw the launch of a partnership between University College Dublin and IEHG to form the CADC, touted as the "largest cancer treatment centre in the country." Two years later, Smith was appointed the national clinical lead for Childhood, Adolescent and Young Adult Cancers by the National Cancer Control Programme. He also co-published a study on Juvenile myelomonocytic leukemia which showed that the cancer cells could be broken into three subgroups through analysis of DNA methylation.

== Personal life ==
Smith and his wife Jude have three children together.
