= Sir John Crampton, 2nd Baronet =

British diplomat

Sir John Fiennes Twisleton Crampton, 2nd Baronet, KCB (1805 – 7 December 1886) was a British diplomat, minister to the United States from 1852 to 1856 and Minister to Russia from 1858 to 1860.

== Early life ==
The son of Sir Philip Crampton, 1st Baronet, a Dublin doctor and scientist, one of the founders of the Pitt Street Institution in Dublin, and his wife Selina Cannon, Crampton was educated at Eton and at Trinity College, Dublin, and became a career diplomat.

He should not be confused with his cousin John Fiennes Twisleton Crampton (1817–1888), a clergyman of the Church of Ireland. Both were descended from John Fiennes Twistleton Crampton (1732–1792), who was the son of the Reverend John Crampton (1706–1771), Archdeacon of Tuam, by his marriage to Charlotte Fiennes Twisleton (1710–1776), a daughter of Colonel Fiennes Twisleton, 11th Baron Saye and Sele (ca. 1670–1730).

== Career ==
Crampton was appointed as Secretary of the British legation at Washington in July 1845, after previous diplomatic service in Turin, St Petersburg, Brussels, and Vienna. In January 1852, he succeeded Sir Henry Bulwer as head of the Washington mission. He was obliged to resign on May 28, 1856, on the demand of U.S. President Franklin Pierce, whose administration accused him of attempting to enlist recruits for the British Army during the Crimean War. As some consolation, Crampton was appointed a Knight Commander of the Order of the Bath (KCB) on 30 September 1856.

His later postings included serving as British Minister Plenipotentiary and Envoy Extraordinary at Hanover, from 2 March 1857 until early in 1858, then returned to St Petersburg as Minister Plenipotentiary to the Russian Empire from 31 March 1858 to 1860. He was finally posted as Minister to Madrid, where he served from 11 December 1860. He resigned from his post in Spain with effect from 1 July 1869, when he retired with a pension, after more than forty years' diplomatic service.

Crampton succeeded his father as 2nd Baronet on 10 June 1858. He died on 7 December 1886 at Bushy Park, Enniskerry, County Wicklow, aged 81.

== Marriage ==
On 31 March 1860, Crampton married Victoria Balfe y Roser (1835 or 1837–1871), who had been born in Paris, a daughter of the Irish author and composer Michael William Balfe (1808–1870), a protégée of Gioachino Rossini, and of Lina Roser, a singer.

In 1860, during Crampton's posting in Madrid, his wife eloped with the 15th Duke of Frías, whom she married in 1864 after her marriage to Crampton was annulled (on her petition) on 20 November 1863 on grounds of his impotence. The affair was considered a scandal by Queens Victoria and Isabel. The 16th and 17th Dukes of Frías were the sons of Victoria Crampton's second marriage.

== Notes ==
Diplomatic posts
Preceded by Sir Henry Bulwer	British Minister to the United States; 1852–1856	Succeeded by Lord Napier
Baronetage of the United Kingdom
Preceded by Sir Philip Crampton	Baronet (of Dublin); 1858 – 1886	Extinct
