= Charles Holroyd =

English painter

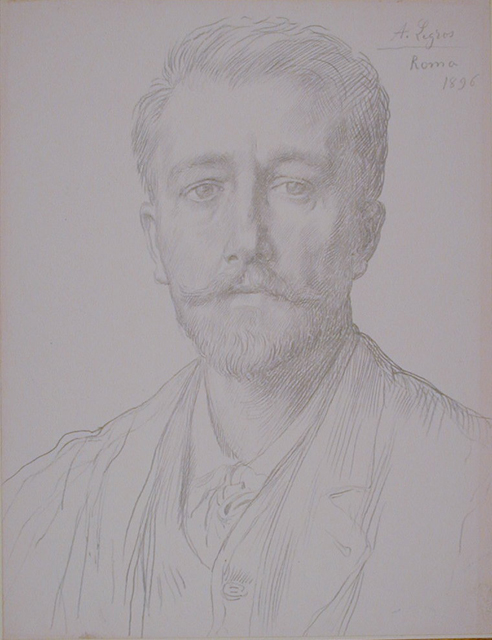
Charles Holroyd in 1896. Drawing by Alphonse Legros.

Sir Charles Holroyd RE (9 April 1861 – 17 November 1917) was an English painter, original printmaker and curator during the late Victorian and Edwardian eras up to and including the First World War. He was Keeper of the Tate from 1897 to 1906, Director of the National Gallery from 1906 to 1916 and Assessor (Vice-President) of the Royal Society of Painter-Etchers & Engravers (now Royal Society of Painter-Printmakers) from 1902 to 1917.

== Biography ==
=== Early years ===
Charles Holroyd was born in Potternewton, Leeds and studied at Leeds Grammar School then Mining Engineering at Yorkshire College of Science. From 1880 to 1884 received his art education under Alphonse Legros at the Slade School, University College, London, teaching there from 1885 to 1891. Holroyd, William Strang, and J. B. Clark are the three pupils of Legros mentioned in Arthur M. Hind’s A History of Engraving and Etching.

After passing six months at Newlyn, where he painted his first picture exhibited in the Royal Academy, Fishermen Mending a Sail (1885), he obtained a travelling scholarship allowing Holroyd to spend 1889-1891 in Rome, which had a lasting effect on both his work (in its subject matter) and future life, for in Rome he met the Australian artist Fannie Featherstonehaugh Macpherson, daughter of the Premier of Victoria. She had coincidentally also trained at the Slade. The couple returned to the UK and, on 7 September 1891, married in the church of St Peter’s, Bayswater. Charles was aged 30 and Fannie 26. The register entry records both of them as "Artists" sharing the address 23 Pembridge Crescent. They then moved to "The Studio," Church Walk, Hampstead where their only child, Michael, was born on 21 September 1892.

At his return, on the invitation of Professor Alphonse Legros, he became for two years assistant-master at the Slade School, and there devoted himself to painting and etching.

=== Career ===
Among his compositions may be mentioned The Death of Torrigiano (1886), The Satyr King (1889), The Supper at Emmaus, and, perhaps his best picture, Pan and Peasants (1893).

For the church of Aveley, Essex, he painted a triptych altar-piece, The Adoration of the Shepherds, with wings representing St Michael and St Gabriel, and designed as well the window, The Resurrection. His portraits, such as that of GF Watts, RA, in the Legros manner, show much dignity and distinction.

Holroyd made his chief reputation as an etcher of exceptional ability, combining strength with delicacy, and a profound and innate technical knowledge of the art. He printed each of his copper plates himself delighting in the variety of papers and various states of a print in bringing to fruition. He did not create formal editions of his prints and printed impressions as and when necessary, consequently compositions are scarce and rarely come on the open market. Holroyd was friends with fellow etchers at the Royal Society of Painter-Etchers & Engravers (RE) particularly Francis Seymour Haden, Alfred East and Frank Short. Holroyd corresponded and swapped work with the French Symbolist artist, Pierre Puvis de Chavannes, who he greatly admired. The influence of Puvis de Chavannes can be seen across Holroyd’s figurative work.

Among Holroyd’s best known works are the Monte Oliveto series, the Icarus series, the Monte Subasio series, the Eve series, the plates, The Flight into Egypt, The Prodigal Son, A Barn on Tadworth Common, "Nymphs by the Sea’’, ‘'The Storm’’ as well as portraits of Fannie, his wife and muse. His principal drypoint is The Bather.

According to the Encyclopædia Britannica Eleventh Edition, "[i]n all his work Holroyd displays an impressive sincerity, with a fine sense of composition, and of style, allied to independent and modern feeling." In 1897 he was appointed the first keeper of the National Gallery of British Art (Tate Gallery at Millbank, which became the Tate, the building having been funded by Sir Henry Tate and having benefitted from the bequest of his art collection. On the retirement of Sir Edward Poynter in 1906 he received the directorship of the National Gallery. Many important additions were made during his period as director, the chief of these being the Rokeby Venus by Velázquez, Masaccio’s Virgin & Child, Raphael’s The Procession to Calvary, Cranach’s Charity and Vermeer’s A Young Woman Seated at the Virginals. He also arranged for the transfer of a large portion of the Turner Bequest to the Tate Gallery.

1903 saw the publication of Holroyd’s 352 page book on the Renaissance genius Michelangelo (Michael Angelo Buonarotti, published by Duckworth, London). This scholarly work is still today regarded as something of real value. It has recently been re-published.

On 18 December 1903 at Buckingham Palace, Holroyd was knighted by King Edward VII ‘for services to art’.

In tandem with his directorships, Holroyd’s own creativity, particularly etching and printing, continued to actively engage him, but was necessarily confined to his spare time and while on holidays in the Lake District, in Italy (Siena and Venice were favourite haunts) and Spain.

Holroyd exhibited new etchings every year (with only three exceptions 1888, 1890 & 1915) at the R.E. for thirty years, from 1885 through to 1916. He also exhibited paintings, mainly in oils, at the Royal Academy from 1885 until 1917, and in 1906 exhibited two etchings, the only year he showed etchings at the R.A.

Compositions by Holroyd can be found in major museums and galleries in the U.K., Ireland, Sweden, Australia, New Zealand and in the USA.

In London a comprehensive cross-section of 135 works displaying his drawing and etching prowess and practice are in the British Museum (see external links). 48 compositions by Holroyd are held in the Victoria & Albert Museum. Twelve works are represented in Tate. One work is in the Royal Collection.

The majority of Holroyd’s etching copper plates, all but 22 of the total 287, some worked on both sides, are housed in the Ashmolean Museum, Oxford.

Holroyd gave each of his prints an opus number, but in five instances where he reworked a plate at a later date he gave the later state a new opus number. Campbell Dodgson, when he compiled the catalogue of Holroyd’s etchings for The Print Collector’s Quarterly in 1923, compacted Holroyd’s numbering, including the later state of the plate with the original one, amalgamating both under the earlier single catalogue number. Hence the occurrence of some apparent reference number discrepancies.

Though Holroyd was a member of the International Society of Sculptors, Painters and Gravers, he only exhibited with them once, a painting, in 1913. He was also a member of the Art Workers' Guild, and was elected Master for the year 1905.

Holroyd was an active and important member of the R.E. in its early years. He was elected a Fellow of the Royal Society of Painter-Etchers (now Royal Society of Painter-Printmakers) from Saturday 13 June 1885 and served on the RE Council for 21 years, becoming this Society’s ‘Assessor’ (effectively its Vice-President) at the behest of Seymour Haden, first RE President, from 1902 until his death.

Holroyd died on 19 November 1917 at the family home, Sturdie House, Beechwood Avenue, Weybridge in Surrey . ‘His death was hastened by the suffragette war’. [11]

In 2022 an on-line exhibition and illustrated publication of Holroyd’s etchings was compiled, written and curated by print-historian, Elizabeth Harvey-Lee (see external links).

His etched work featured prominently in the London Original Print Fair (LOPF), Somerset House, London, in March 2023.

== See also ==
- List of knights bachelor appointed in 1903

Cultural offices
Preceded by Did not exist	Director of the Tate Gallery; 1897–1906	Succeeded by D. S. MacColl
