= Royal Academy of Medicine in Ireland =

The Royal Academy of Medicine in Ireland (RAMI) is a learned medical society in Dublin, Ireland.

== History ==
RAMI was established in 1882 by the amalgamation of the Dublin Society of Surgeons, the Medical Society of the Royal College of Physicians of Ireland, the Pathological Society and the Dublin Obstetrical Society. Its first president was John Thomas Banks. Other former presidents include James Little and Charles Bent Ball. Victoria Coffey was a former president of the RAMI paediatrics section.

The Irish Journal of Medical Science is the official journal of RAMI.

== Fellowship ==
Fellows of the Academy may use the post nominal letters “FRAMI”.

== Notable Fellows ==
- Dermot P. Kelleher
- David Drummond
- Cliona O’Farrelly
