= Ezekiel Nesbitt =

18th century Irish doctor

Ezekiel Nesbitt (1712–1798) was an Irish medical doctor who twice held the presidency of the Royal College of Physicians of Ireland (RCPI).

== Background and education ==
Nesbitt was born in County Donegal and educated privately in the town of Raphoe. His father, George Nesbitt, was a clergyman from Mountcharles in Donegal. Ezekiel studied at Trinity College Dublin from 1728/1729 to 1732, graduating with a Bachelor of Arts degree. He went on to obtain a medical degree at Leiden in the Netherlands, graduating in 1734. He returned to Trinity College Dublin, where he was awarded a Doctor of Medicine degree in 1740. He was admitted as a candidate for examination at the RCPI in 1741 and received his Fellowship in 1746. He was twice elected President of RCPI, in 1753–1754 and 1763–1764, and in 1765 was made an Honorary Fellow of the college.

== Career ==
Most of Nesbitt's career was spent in private practice in the town of Bath in Somerset, England. In 1759, he was appointed as a physician at the Rotunda Hospital in Dublin, one of the first maternity hospitals in the world. Nesbitt had been recommended by Bartholomew Mosse, the founder and Master of the hospital. Nesbitt moved to Bath permanently around 1764 but did not resign from his post at the Rotunda until prompted to do so by the Secretary of the Board of Governors in 1774.

== Personal life ==
In 1747, Nesbitt married Lady Crofton (née Martha Damer), widow of the late Sir Edward Crofton, 4th Baronet. Through this marriage Nesbitt joined the influential Dawson-Damer family and benefitted from his wife's £1,000 per annum stipend – equivalent to more than £230,000 in 2020. Nesbitt had broad interests, including the history of Ireland, celestial cartography, seashells, the flora of London, and gardening. Nesbitt died in Bath in 1798.
