= Rose Anne Kenny =

Irish geriatrician, neuroscientist and cardiologist

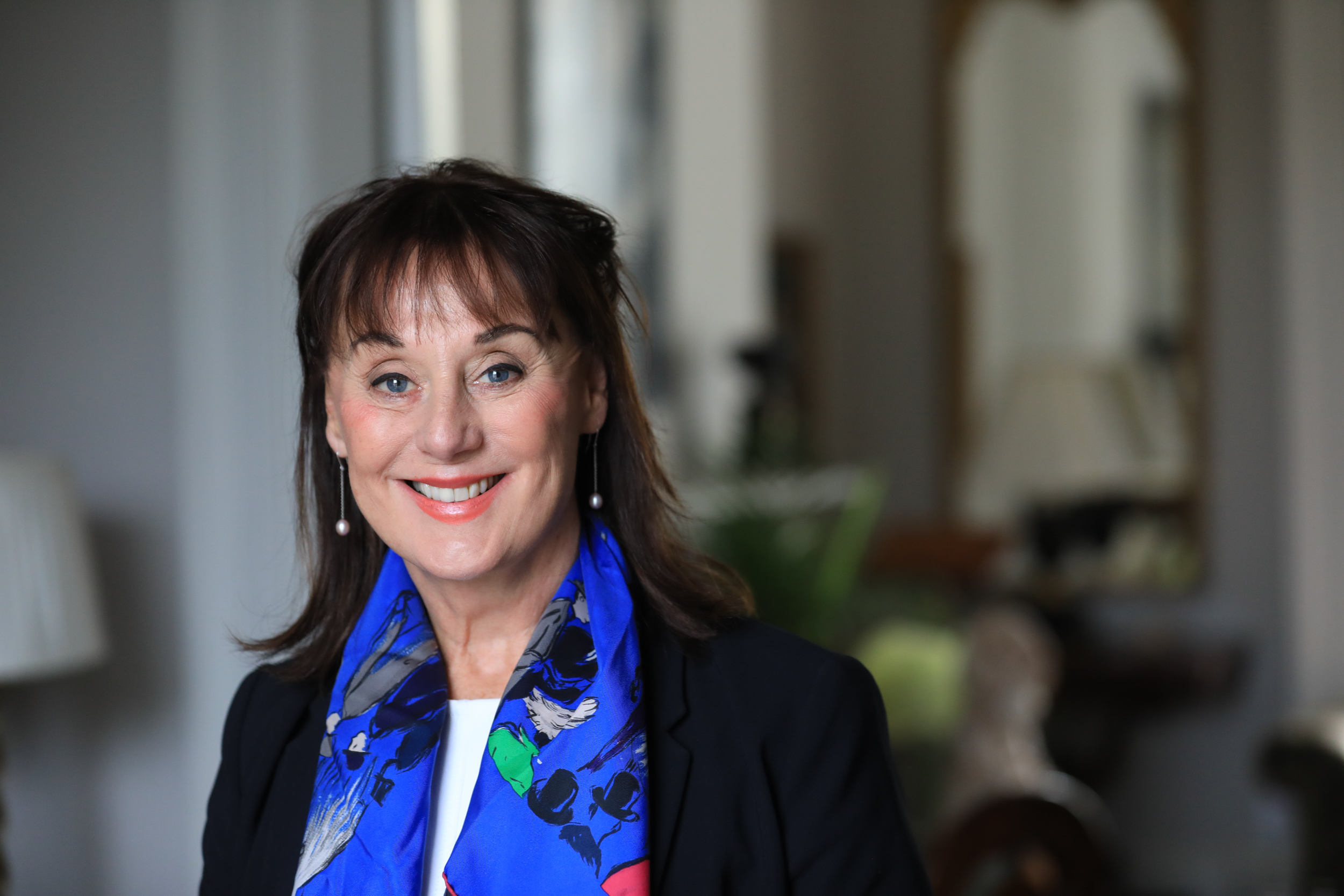
- Education: NUI Galway
- Known for: Principal investigator of TILDA; Professor at Trinity College Dublin
- Awards: Lady Illingworth Research Award (1996); Research into Ageing Edgar Palamountain Award (1998); NHS Modernisation Award (2003); BUPA Foundation Care Award (2003); Royal Irish Academy (2014) President of the Irish Gerontological Society (2020); Strategic Director for the Academic Health Sciences Centre, St James’s Hospital and Trinity College Dublin (2021)
- Scientific career
- Fields: Gerontology; Health; Neuroscience; Medicine
- Workplaces: Westminster Hospital; Hammersmith Hospital; Newcastle University; Trinity College Dublin; St James's Hospital; Mercers' Institute for Successful Ageing

Rose Anne Kenny is an Irish physician-scientist and best-selling author with a clinical and research interest in medical gerontology. She is the Regius Professor of Physic, the first female nominee, and holds the chair of medical gerontology at Trinity College Dublin (TCD), director of the Falls and Syncope Unit at St James's Hospital in Dublin, director of the Mercer's Institute for Successful Ageing and founding principal investigator of The Irish Longitudinal Study on Ageing (TILDA) (2006). She is the Director of the newly created WHO Collaborating Centre for Longitudinal Studies in Ageing and the Life Course.

Regius Kenny is a fellow of Trinity College Dublin and of the Royal Colleges of Physicians of Ireland, London and Edinburgh. She is a member of the Royal Irish Academy and Fellow of Trinity College Dublin, a Fellow of the European Society of Cardiology, an Honorary Fellow of the Faculty of Public Health Medicine Ireland, the 2022 Valkholf Chair for Radboud University Nijmegen, and was recently awarded an Honorary Doctorate from the Royal College of Surgeons in Ireland. In 2020, she became President of the Irish Gerontological Society. She has received a number of international awards and has published widely, authoring over 600 publications including, her recently published book “Age Proof – The New Science of Living a Longer and Healthier Life” which was shortlisted for the Royal Society Science Book Prize in 2022.

== Career ==
Rose Anne Kenny began her career studying medicine at NUI Galway. She did her clinical training at Hammersmith Hospital and Westminster Hospital in London. In 1989, Kenny was promoted to Professor of Cardiovascular Research at the University of Newcastle, where she was head of academic and clinical departments in Medical Gerontology. In 1992, Kenny established the first dedicated syncope service in the UK, a practice which has been replicated worldwide.

In 2005, she was appointed professor of Medical Gerontology at TCD and as head of the academic department of Medical Gerontology at St James' Hospital Dublin. Kenny is the founding Principal Investigator of TILDA, a large-scale, nationally representative, longitudinal study on ageing in Ireland, the overarching aim of which is to make Ireland the best place in the world to grow old. Her research in cardiovascular and mobility ageing issues has led to the incorporation of novel tests of motion range and cognitive health in TILDA. She has published over 600 pieces of work and is also the Founding Director, of the Trinity Ageing Research Centre (TARC - formerly known as Trinity CollegeTrinity EngAGE), Trinity College Dublin's Centre for Research in Ageing. Kenny is co-founder and director of the Mercer's Institute for Successful Ageing, where she set up a 120-bed clinical research facility, the largest purpose built clinical research facility for ageing in Ireland and the UK. She has also published extensively on cardiovascular risk factors for falls and cognitive decline in ageing. Regius Kenny's research interests are in neurocardiovascular function in ageing and cardiovascular and cerebral dysfunction in syncope, falls, cognitive impairment and dementia.

Kenny has a number of national (UK and Ireland) and international advisory boards for policy including the Irish Citizens' Assembly on Ageing, Technology future’s project steering group, department of Jobs, Enterprise and Innovation (technology). Her contribution to science has been recognised by many awards including the Lady Illingworth Research Award, the BUPA Foundation Care Award and membership of the Royal Irish Academy.

In September 2017, she was awarded the Presidential Medal, the highest honour from The Irish Gerontological Society for her achievements in the field of gerontological research at the 65th Annual & Scientific Meeting. She was also awarded the World Congress on Falls and Postural Stability (WCFPS) Lifetime Achievement Award in 2019 and Health Hero by the Irish Times in 2018. Kenny also holds achievements as the 2021 Honorary Fellow Faculty of Public Health Medicine (F.F.P.H.M.I (Hon)) and has chaired the selection committee for Provost of Trinity College Dublin, 2021.

== Media Appearances ==
Professor Kenny has made numerous appearances on both TV and radio platforms over the past decade, regularly appearing at least monthly in Irish media interviews in television, radio and print. Some examples include contributing towards a two-hour documentary that she wrote and delivered (2010) on ageing for Ireland’s national broadcaster (RTE) called The End of Ageing; Nationwide (2018), Ear to the Ground (2020) and “10 Things to Know About…” (2020) where she communicated research from the TILDA study and its COVID-19 related research studies. She has also given television interviews to Al-Jazeera English, BBC and numerous radio interviews (Drivetime RTE, Newstalk and RTE Radio One), and her research has also featured in several podcasts and newspaper articles. In partnership with the GAA, she delivered a National Road Show and public outreach campaign delivering insight and research on, ‘How to Age Well’ communicating research to each county in Ireland in 2019 and early 2020. She has written a new book entitled, Age is Not a Number soon to be published by Bonnier Publications, of London and Stockholm in January 2022.

== Honours and memberships ==
- 1990: Fellow of the Royal College of Physicians of Ireland
- 1994: Fellow of the Royal College of Physicians of London
- 1996: Lady Illingworth Research Award – only presented every 5 years to a clinician who has made an outstanding contribution to age-related study in the UK
- 1998: The Research into Ageing Edgar Palamountain Prize – awarded for an article on medical geriatrics judged to have the most significant contribution to the field
- 2000: Novartis Travel Fellowship – awarded by the Australian Association of Physicians to a guest clinician in the field of geriatric medicine
- 2002: Marjorie Warren Lecture
- 2003: Fellow of the European Society of Cardiology
- 2003: NHS Modernisation Award – "for clinical leadership in the NHS" (runner up)
- 2003: BUPA Foundation Care Award – "for excellence in the development of care of older people"
- 2006: Member of the Academic Board of the European Union Geriatric Medicine Society
- 2006: Professor of Medical Gerontology, Trinity College Dublin
- 2006: Consultant Physician, St. James's Hospital, Dublin 8
- 2006: Director Mercers Institute for Successful Ageing, St. James's Hospital, Dublin 8
- 2006: Director Falls and Syncope Service, St. James's Hospital, Dublin
- 2006: Founding Principal Investigator, TILDA, Trinity College Dublin
- 2009: Founding Director, Trinity Ageing Research Centre, (TARC), Trinity College
- 2010: Member of the European Heart Rhythm Association
- 2013: Fellow of the Royal College of Physicians of Edinburgh
- 2013: Elected Fellow of Trinity College Dublin
- 2014: Admitted to the Royal Irish Academy
- 2018: Head of Department of Medical Gerontology, Trinity College Dublin
- 2020: President of the Irish Gerontological Society
- 2022: Regius Professor of Physic, Trinity College Dublin
