= Gerald O'Reilly =

Irish politician (died 1915)

Lord Mayor of Dublin
- In office 1908–1909
- Preceded by: Joseph Nannetti
- Succeeded by: William Coffey

Personal details
- Died: 19 March 1915 Dublin, Ireland
- Party: Irish Parliamentary Party

Gerald O'Reilly (died 19 March 1915) was an Irish politician. He was a member of Dublin Corporation, and served as Lord Mayor of Dublin from 1908 to 1909. He was a member of the Irish Parliamentary Party.

O'Reilly was a Dublin wine and spirits merchant, and was a member of Dublin Corporation for more than 30 years until his death. In 1905 he was appointed Sheriff of Dublin City.

Civic offices
Preceded by Joseph Nannetti	Lord Mayor of Dublin; 1908–1909	Succeeded by William Coffey
