= Lucinda Sullivan =

- Born: Lucinda Brady; 1831; Castleconnell, County Limerick, Ireland
- Died: 29 August 1881 (aged 49–50); Bray, County Wicklow

Lucinda Sullivan (1831 – 29 August 1881) was an Irish nurse, philanthropist, writer and promoter of children's welfare, and founder of the Sunbeam House.

== Early life and family ==
Lucinda Sullivan was born Lucinda Brady in 1831, most likely in Castleconnell, County Limerick. Her father was Captain William Edward Brady, chief constable of police in Castleconnell, having previously served as a lieutenant in the 2nd West India Regiment. Her mother was William's second wife, Lucinda Catherine (née Forester). Sullivan was the youngest child, with one older sister, and three older half-siblings. No records of her early years survive, but it is likely that she was well educated. She married Robert Sullivan on 22 December 1865 in Monkstown parish church. The couple lived at Clarinda Park West, Dún Laoghaire for two years. Her husband suffered a stroke in 1867, and died on 11 July 1868 having been nursed by Sullivan for his final year. He bequeathed her £45,000 in his will.

== Career ==
Sullivan travelled to Männedorf, Switzerland in the summer of 1872 to stay in a house established by Dorothea Trudel, a faith healer. Trudel believed that physical and mental illnesses could be cured by prayer and the laying of hands, with her followers continuing her work after her death. In 1873, she published a memoir, Diary of a month in Männedorf, detailing the traumatic event that changed her life when she was in Männedorf. She took a steamboat across Lake Zurich to visit a school on 28 August 1872, and on the return journey the steamboat she was travelling on, the St Gotthard, was struck by another steamboat, the Concordia. She was the last to leave the ferry, which had 450 children and 50 adults on board. She recalled that while she waited she fixed her mind on a man badly deformed by tetanus that she had met ten years earlier stating that her "deepest interest [was] awakened on the subject of female workers among the sick, the ignorant and the poor" and committed to dedicating her life to the care in thanks for her life being saved.

To fulfil this goal, she travelled to Kaiserwerth to train at the Kaiserwerth Deaconess Hospital. Founded by Pastor Theodor Fliedner, women training to be deaconesses learnt nursing skills and theology, with Florence Nightingale being the hospital's most famous graduate. When she finished her studies, Sullivan went to work tending to sick children at the Mildmay Deaconess Hospital near Shoreditch, London for a number of weeks. She returned to Ireland in late 1872, and was appointed the first lady superintendent of the Adelaide Hospital in Dublin. In the hospital she saw the suffering of the "sick poor" including children with joint and spinal diseases brought on by poverty and damp. This inspired her to provide a home with hospital care, schooling and industrial training. On 26 October 1874 she set out her proposal in a letter in the Daily Express, with Sullivan receiving donations of £300.

Sullivan took ownership of the vacant Bray Auxiliary Hospital for Incurables, formerly a Workmen's Hall, on Lower Dargle Road, Bray in late 1874. Opening in December 1874 the hospital, named "Home for Crippled Children", had 14 beds in the Crompton Ward (named in honour of the hospital's previous owner, Judge Philip Crompton) and a school room. Above the front door was the inscription "... as a thanksgiving to Almighty God for deliverance from peril of shipwreck". The first of its kind in Ireland, the hospital relied on fundraising and charitable donations. Sullivan was skilled at attracting wealthy patrons and securing philanthropic funds for the hospital, including the wife of the lord lieutenant of Ireland, Lady Louisa Abercorn raising almost £2,000 by February 1875, with the Abercorn wing opening in 1877. Sullivan had a guestbook in the entrance hall, which included William Ewart Gladstone and his wife, the queen of Romania, Elisabeth of Wied and Olave Baden-Powell.

== Death and legacy ==
Sullivan remained the lady superintendent of Adelaide Hospital until early 1875, due to her declining health and to focus on the Home for Crippled Children. She was diagnosed with cancer in 1880, which led her to establishing an endowment fund with her sister, Louise, named as successor. Sullivan died on 23 August 1881 at the Home in Bray. She is buried in Mount Jerome Cemetery, Dublin. She left £4,000 to the Home, £100 each to the Mildmay and Kaiserwerth institutions, and bequests to the Church of Ireland Representative Body and the Society for the Prevention of Cruelty to Animals, Dublin and the Church Missionary Society. The Home for Crippled Children continued to develop after Sullivan's death, becoming a treatment centre for children with rickets, changing its name to Sunbeam House in the 1920s. It later became a children's convalescent home, and in 1958 it became a home for people with intellectual disability. By 1970, it was known as the Sunbeam House Special National School, and by 1976 it was Ireland's first multi-denominational and co-educational special needs national school recognised by the Department of Education as the New Court School. More recently it is known as Sunbeam House Services.
