= Lambert Hepenstal Ormsby =

Irish surgeon (1850–1923)

Sir Lambert Hepenstal Ormsby
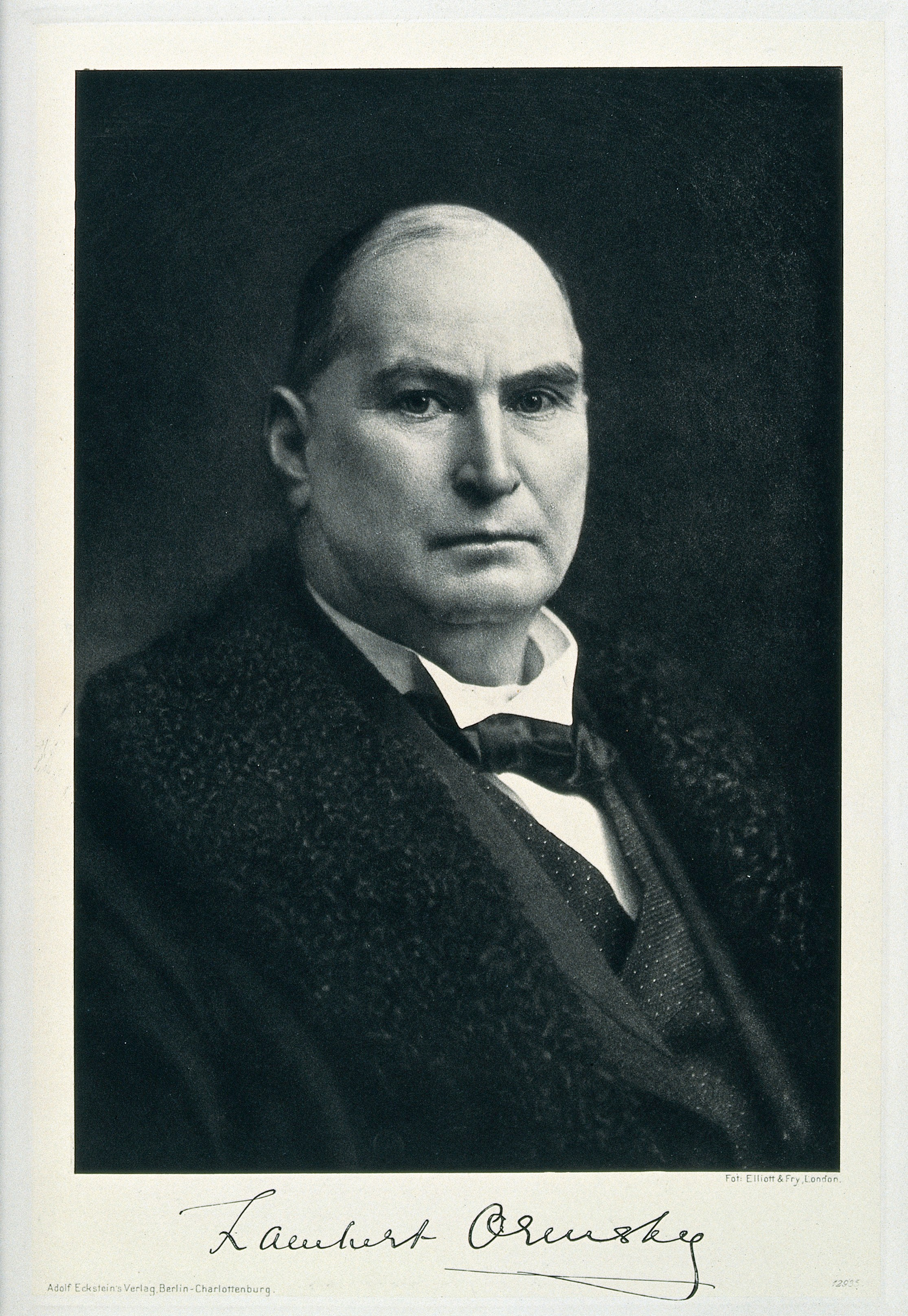
- Sir Lambert Hepenstal Ormsby (before 1910)
- Born: 19 July 1850; Ireland, United Kingdom of Great Britain and Ireland
- Died: 21 December 1923 (aged 73); Irish Free State
- Occupation: Surgeon
- Known for: Working at Meath Hospital

Sir Lambert Hepenstal Ormsby M.D., Uniy. Dub.; FRCS (19 July 1850 – 21 December 1923) was an Irish surgeon.

== Selected publications ==
- Nature and treatment of Deformities of the human body. Dublin, 1875.
- Medical History of the Meath Hospital and County Dublin Infirmary &c. Dublin: Fannin & Co., Dublin, 1888.
