= Richard Helsham =

Irish physician (1683–1738)

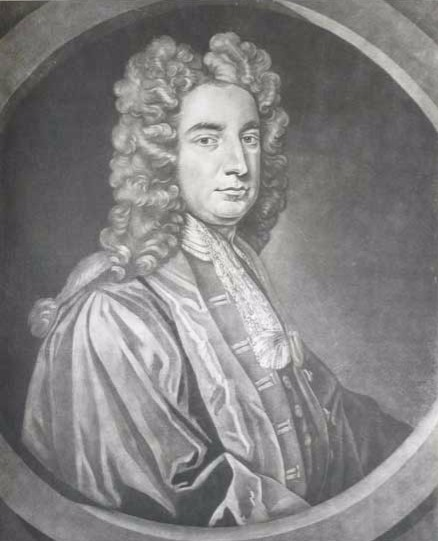
Richard Helsham

Richard Helsham (1683 – 1 August 1738) was an Irish physician and natural philosopher at Trinity College Dublin. He was the inaugural Erasmus Smith's Professor of Natural and Experimental Philosophy from 1724 and Regius Professor of Physic from 1733.

== Life ==
Helsham was born at Leggetsrath, Kilkenny City, son of Joshua Helsham. He was educated at Kilkenny College, and entered Trinity College Dublin on 18 July 1697. He was a Scholar in 1700, graduated BA in 1702, was elected a Fellow in 1704, and got MA in 1705. He then studied medicine, and became a Fellow of the Royal College of Physicians of Ireland in 1710. Back at TCD, he became MD in 1713, and was co-opted a senior fellow in 1714, eventually resigning from that position in 1730.

Helsham was Donegall Lecturer in Mathematics (1723–1730), He was a trustee of Dr Steevens' Hospital.

Helsham was a friend of Jonathan Swift, and of Dublin men of letters generally, including Michael Clancy and Patrick Delany. He died on 25 August 1738, and was interred in the churchyard of St Mary's Church, Dublin.

== Works ==
Helsham's Lectures on Natural Philosophy, edited by his lifelong friend Bryan Robinson, Regius Professor of Physic at the University of Dublin, were published in 1739, and a second edition appeared in 1743. He found an inverse-square law in magnetism, but the early editions do not treat electricity.

With Patrick Delany, Helsham wrote an anonymous political pamphlet, A long history of a short session of parliament in a certain kingdom (Dublin, 1714). It was aimed at the Irish Parliament, was considered scandalous, and was ordered to be burnt by the common hangman. The Privy Council of Ireland offered a reward to discover its author.

== Family ==
Helsham married Jane Putland, widow of Thomas Putland, in 1730. Her unmarried name was Rolton.

== Notes ==
Attribution This article incorporates text from a publication now in the public domain: Stephen, Leslie; Lee, Sidney, eds. (1891). "Helsham, Richard". Dictionary of National Biography. Vol. 25. London: Smith, Elder & Co.
