= Sir Philip Crampton, 1st Baronet =

Irish surgeon and anatomist, President of the RCSI

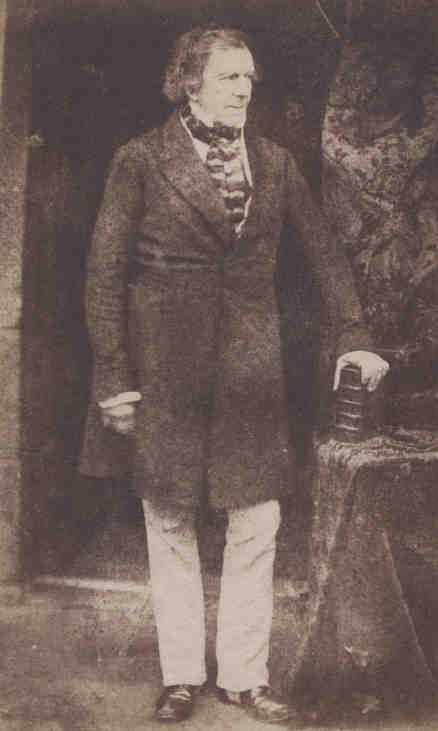
- Born: 7 June 1777; Dublin, Ireland
- Died: 10 June 1858 (aged 81); Dublin, Ireland
- Spouse: Selina Cannon (m. 1800, died)
- Children: 6, including John
- Relatives: Philip Cecil Crampton (cousin)
- Medical career
- Institutions: Royal College of Surgeons in Ireland
- Sub-specialties: Anatomy

Sir Philip Crampton, 1st Baronet, FRS MRCSI MRIA (7 June 1777 – 10 June 1858) was an Irish surgeon and anatomist. He was President of the Royal College of Surgeons in Ireland (RCSI) in 1811, 1820, 1844 and 1855.

== Life ==
Crampton was born in Dublin, Ireland, the son of John Crampton and Anne (née Verner). His father, a prosperous dentist, was a member of the Church of Ireland, while his mother was Presbyterian, of Ulster-Scottish descent with ancestral roots in Auchendinny. He was a childhood friend of Theobald Wolfe Tone, the United Irishman, and a cousin, on his mother's side, of Thomas Verner, Grand Master of the Orange Order. He was indentured to Solomon Richards and soon after commenced studies at the RCSI. He joined the army as an assistant surgeon. When he was appointed surgeon to the Meath Hospital in 1798 he was not yet fully qualified, and went on to graduate MD in Glasgow University in 1800 and by 1801 he was a Member of the RCSI. He was to remain in the Meath Hospital for nearly sixty years. A few years later he also became assistant surgeon at the Lock Hospital, Dublin and also built up a large private practice at his house in Dawson St. He joined Peter Harkan in teaching anatomy in private lectures, forming the first private school of anatomy and surgery in the city.

Cameron in his History of the RCSI notes of him: " In 1805 Crampton published an essay on Entropeon, or inversion of the eyelid, which excited considerable interest at the time. In 1813 he described a muscle in the eyes of birds, arising from the inner surface of the bony hoop which surrounds the cornea, and terminating in a circular tendon connected with the circular lamina of the cornea. By means of this muscle the lens can be so adjusted—telescoped, so to speak—as to enable it to see objects at short or long distances, as required. This muscle has been termed musculus cramptonius in honour of its discoverer". He became a Fellow of the Royal Society (F.R.S.) in Ireland for this treatise on the construction of eyes of birds. This was later published, with other writings, in the Dublin Journal of Medical Science.

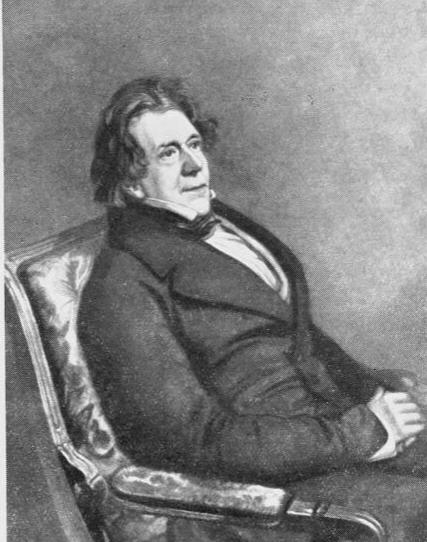

In 1821, together with Sir Henry Marsh (with whom he shared a mutual cousin, Philip Cecil Crampton) and Dr. Charles Johnston, he founded a children's hospital in Pitt St. (now Balfe St.), the Institute for Sick Children in 1821. This hospital was the first teaching children's hospital in Ireland or Great Britain. The main objective of the hospital was to treat sick children in one of the poorest parts of Dublin, The Liberties.

He resigned the chief-surgeoncy of the Lock Hospital when he was appointed surgeon-general to the forces in Ireland. He remained as consulting surgeon to Dr Steevens' Hospital and the Dublin Lying-in Hospital. He was elected President of the Royal College of Surgeons in Ireland (RCSI) on four occasions. Lady Harriet Kavanagh recruited him to help support her son Arthur MacMurrough Kavanagh, who was born with vestigial limbs, in living an active life. Crampton created a mechanical wheelchair for the child, who later went on to be an MP. Crampton was created a baronet on 14 March 1839.

He was always interested in zoological science and played an active part in founding the Royal Zoological Society of Ireland and was many times its president. In 1853, he was introduced to a large plesiosaur fossil by the Marquess of Normanby at the latter's residence, Mulgrave Castle. Later that year, Crampton transferred the fossil to the Royal Zoological Society in Dublin. A decade later, after Crampton's death, the specimen was moved to the Royal Dublin Society museum and was officially described by Alexander Carte and W. H. Bailey as a new species of Plesiosaurus. Carte and Bailey named the species Plesiosaurus cramptoni in Crampton's honour.

Crampton was also a member of the Royal Irish Academy. He died at his residence, 14 Merrion Square, in Dublin. By his wife, the former Selina Cannon (the daughter of an army officer whom he married on 10 May 1800, and who died on 9 April 1834 from burns she sustained in an accident), he had two sons and four daughters. He was succeeded in the title by his eldest son John, second and last Baronet.

== The Crampton Memorial ==
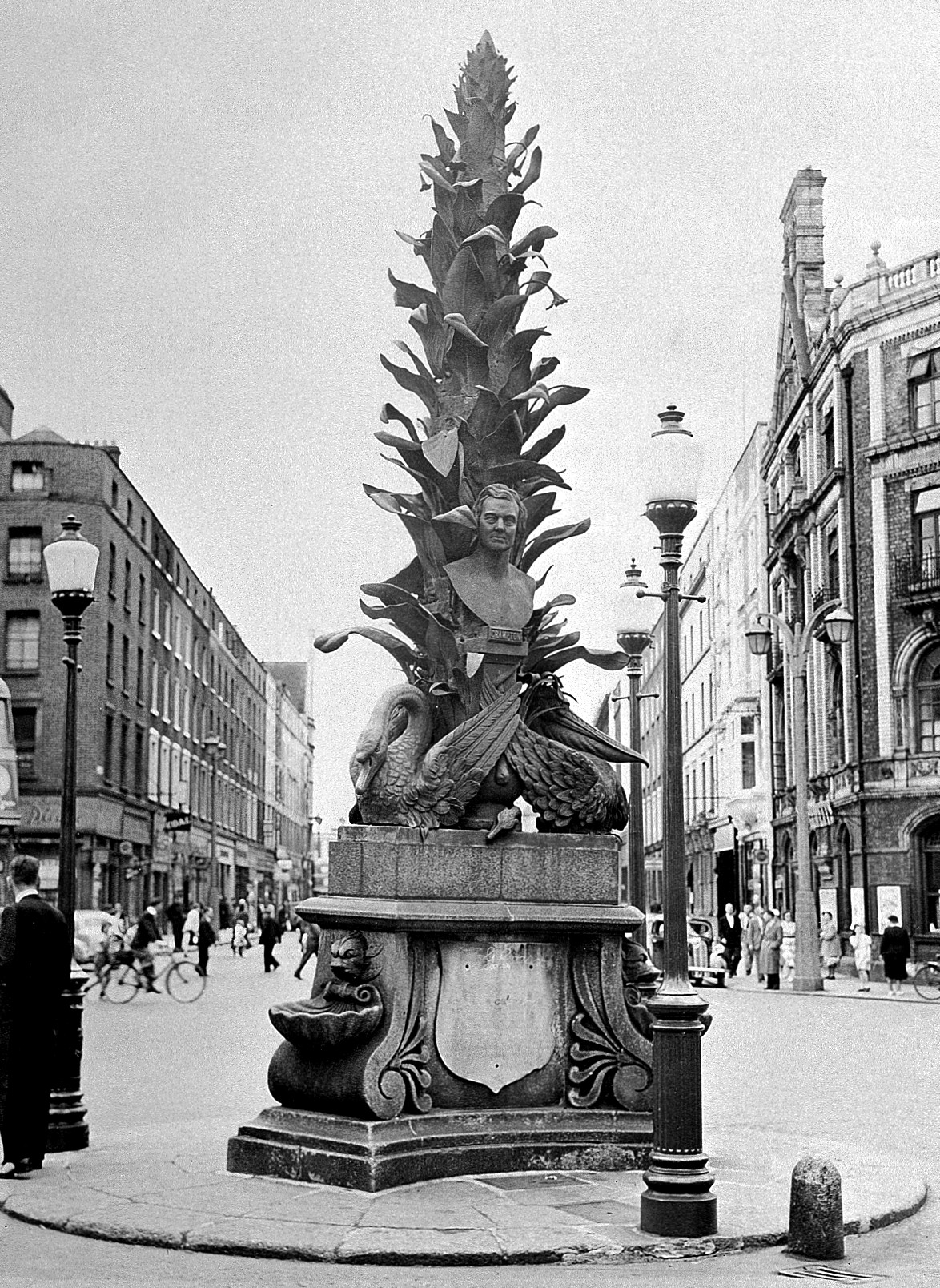
Sir Philip Crampton's memorial in Dublin

The Crampton Memorial, at the junction of College Street with Pearse Street and D'Olier Street, was erected from the design of John Kirk the sculptor in 1862. It was of a curious design, consisting of a bust above a fountain and surmounted by a cascade of metal foliage. This monument was locally known in the 19th century as the "water-babe", and later as the "cauliflower", "pineapple" or "artichoke". As it was slowly falling apart, it was removed in 1959. James Joyce references the monument in his novel Ulysses when Leopold Bloom passes the monument and thinks, "Sir Philip Crampton's memorial fountain bust. Who was he?" Joyce also references the sculpture in his novel A Portrait of the Artist as a Young Man as the protagonist Stephen Dedalus explains different forms of art to his friend: “Is the bust of Sir Philip Crampton lyrical, epical, or dramatic?”

== References and sources ==
Notes

Sources

- Boylan, Henry (1998). A Dictionary of Irish Biography, 3rd Edition. Dublin: Gill and MacMillan. ISBN 0-7171-2945-4.
- Cameron, Sir Charles A. (1886). History of the Royal College of Surgeons in Ireland, and of the Irish Schools of Medicine &c. Dublin: Fannin.
- Fleetwood, John F (1983). The History of Medicine in Ireland. Dublin: Skellig Press.
- Peter, A. (1927). Dublin Fragments: Social and Historic. Dublin: Hodges Figgis & Co.
- Cosgrave, Ephraim McDowel; Strangways, L.R. (1908). A Dictionary of Dublin (2nd ed.). Dublin: Sealy, Bryers and Walkers.

Baronetage of the United Kingdom
New creation	Baronet (of Dublin); 1839–1858	Succeeded by Sir John Crampton
