= Meath Hospital =

Former hospital in Dublin, Ireland

- Health Service Executive
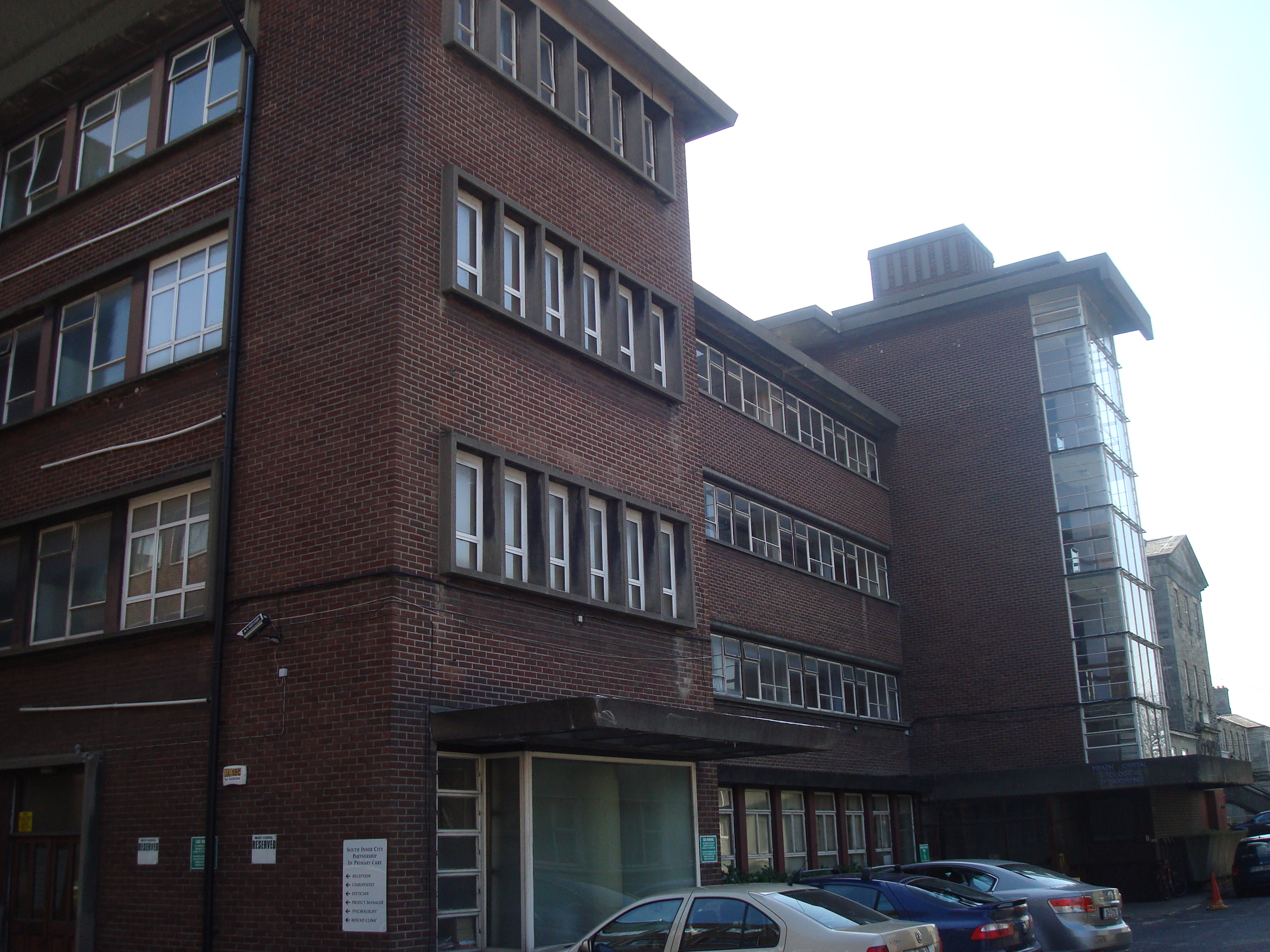
- Meath Hospital, now a respite home

- Shown in Dublin

Geography
- Location: Dublin, Ireland
- Coordinates: 53°20′09″N 6°16′11″W

Organisation
- Care system: HSE
- Type: General

History
- Founded: 1753
- Closed: 1998

The Meath Hospital (Irish: Ospidéal na Mí) was a general hospital in the Earl of Meath's Liberty in Dublin, Ireland. It was absorbed into the Tallaght Hospital in June 1998.

== History ==
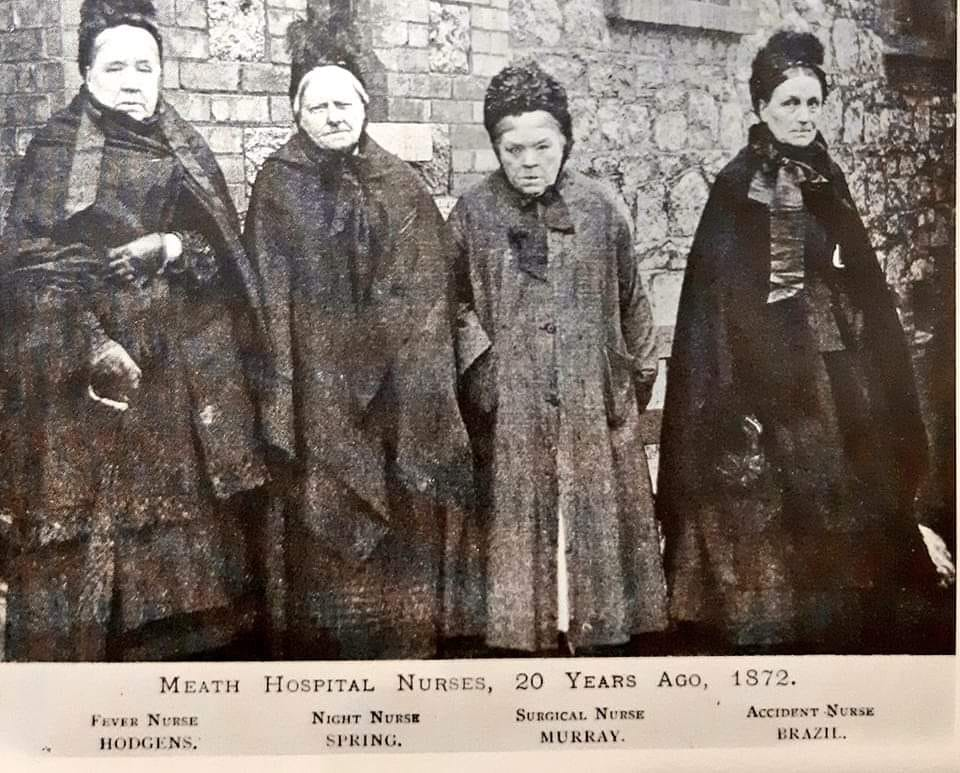
A photograph of nurses in the Meath Hospital, Dublin in 1872.

The hospital was opened to serve the sick and poor in the crowded area of the Liberties in Dublin in 1753.

=== The Coombe ===
A dedicated hospital building was later constructed in the Coombe with Anthony Brabazon, 8th Earl of Meath laying the foundation stone on 10 October 1770.

=== Heytesbury Street ===
It then moved to larger premises fronting Heytesbury Street off Long Lane in 1822 with its previous premises becoming The Coombe Hospital from then onwards.

In the nineteenth century the Meath Hospital achieved worldwide fame as a result of the revolutionary teaching methods and groundbreaking research carried out by Robert Graves and William Stokes, physicians of the hospital. One example was when during a typhus epidemic Robert Graves introduced the revolutionary idea of giving food during the illness ("he fed fevers" was what Graves requested be inscribed on his tombstone).

It was absorbed into the Tallaght Hospital in June 1998. The original building was subsequently converted for use as a respite home.

== Notable physicians ==
Notable physicians included:

- John Cheyne (1777–1836), appointed a physician in the hospital in 1811.
- Sir Philip Crampton (1777–1858), appointed surgeon to the hospital in 1798 (though not fully qualified).
- Patrick Harkan, of Raheen, County Roscommon, appointed a physician in the hospital in 1817. He later went on to the Cork Street Fever Hospital, where he remained for forty years.
- Francis Rynd (1801-1861), physician and inventor of the hypodermic syringe.
- Thomas Hawkesworth Ledwich (1823–1858), appointed to take over from Philip Crampton in 1858.
- Rawdon Macnamara (1822–1893), appointed a surgeon in 1861 (a post his father had occupied).
- Arthur Wynne Foot, physician and curator to the hospital's pathological museum before leaving to become a lecturer in the Ledwich School.
- Sir Lambert Ormsby (1850-1923), appointed a surgeon to the hospital in 1872 and provided service for over fifty years.
