= Arthur Wynne Foot =

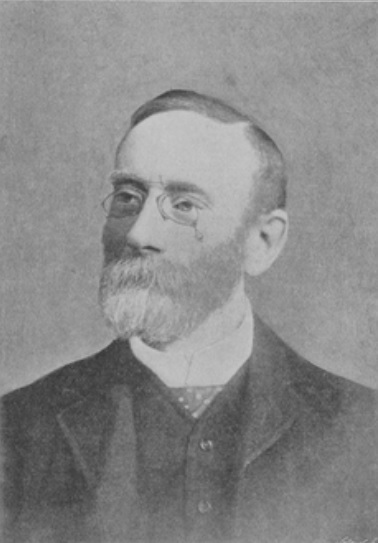
- Born: 22 January 1838; Dublin, Ireland
- Died: 1 September 1900 (aged 62); Dublin

Arthur Wynne Foot (22 January 1838 – 1 September 1900) was an Irish doctor, professor of medicine, and an entomologist.

== Biography ==
Arthur Wynne Foot was born on 22 January 1838 in Dublin. His father was a barrister and later director of the Bank of Ireland, Lundy Edward Foot. His mother was Lelias Callwell. Foot had two brothers and four sisters who survived past childhood. The Foot family were originally from Cornwall. Foot attended Portarlington School, and entered Trinity College Dublin (TCD). He was placed in Meath Hospital as an apprentice to Maurice Henry Colles. He graduated from TCD and received his licence from the Royal College of Surgeons in Ireland (RSCI) in 1862. He obtained his MD in 1865, and the diploma in state medicine in 1871.

In 1864 he was appointed demonstrator of anatomy in the TCD medical school. He held this position until 1871, when he succeeded Alfred Hudeon as the physician to Meath Hospital. He was also curator of the hospital's pathological museum. He was appointed lecturer in medicine at the Ledwich School in 1873, until 1884 when he became chair of medicine at the RCSI. He remained at the RCSI until 1893. He served as an examiner to the Royal College of Physicians of Ireland, and later served as vice president. He also published and lectured widely, including on the treatment of morphine addiction.

Foot was also a noted amateur zoologist, with a particular interest in entomology. During the 1860s and 1870s, he was an active member of the Dublin Natural History Society. A collection of his specimens is held in the Natural History Museum, Dublin.

Foot died in Dublin on 1 September 1900 after a period of ill health which resulted in his early retirement. An obituary was published in the British Medical Journal.
