= Robert Collins (physician) =

Irish physician (1800–1868)

- Born: 1800; Rock Lodge, Desertcreat, County Tyrone, Ireland
- Died: 11 December 1868 (aged 67–68); 4 Ely Place, Dublin

Robert Collins (1800 – 11 December 1868) was an Irish physician who became master of the Rotunda Hospital aged 26. He pioneered methods to control the spread of puerperal fever in the hospital, and the use of the stethoscope in obstetrics.

== Life ==
Robert Collins was born at Rock Lodge, Desertcreat, County Tyrone. His parents were Martha (née Clarke) and James Collins. He studied medicine at the University of Glasgow, under physicians such as Samuel Labatt. Around 1824, he married Barbara Clarke, daughter of Dr Joseph Clarke and Isabella Cleghorn. They had 5 children, with only their son Joshua known to have raised his own family. In 1833, Barbara died suddenly in Dublin. Collins on 11 December 1868 died at 4 Ely Place, Dublin.

== Career ==
After his graduation, Collins was appointed assistant master to the Rotunda Hospital under John Pentland. In 1824, he received his licence from the King's and Queen's College of Physicians of Ireland (K&QCPI). Following Pentland's death, Collins was appointed master of the Rotunda Hospital on 26 August 1826, aged 26. In this period, puerperal fever was endemic in maternity hospitals, with 16% of women contracting the disease after giving birth. The mortality rate was on average 30%, and higher in more overcrowded hospitals. Collins' based his practices on those of his father-in-law, Dr Joseph Clarke, which were to improve cleanliness in the hospital and encourage home births. He oversaw a regime of ward cleaning with chloride of lime, ward rotation, and the isolation of sick patients from those who were well. During the last 4 years of his mastership of the Rotunda, there were no deaths from puerperal fever. He documented his practices in his 1835 textbook, A Practical Treatise of Midwifery.

Collins was also a pioneer of the use of the stethoscope in obstetrics. He used the instrument to detect a foetal heartbeat, to confirm pregnancy, assess for twins, and to monitor or detect foetal distress in labour. After he left the Rotunda in 1833, he entered private practice, and published a number of books on his medical techniques. Collins was awarded both an M.D. by Trinity College Dublin and elected a fellow of the K&QCPI in 1839. From 1842 to 1847 he served as treasurer of the K&QCPI, and during the Great Famine, he served as the president from 1847 to 1848.
