= Bryan Robinson (physician) =

Irish physician (1680–1754)

Bryan Robinson (1680–1754) was an Irish physician, academic and writer.

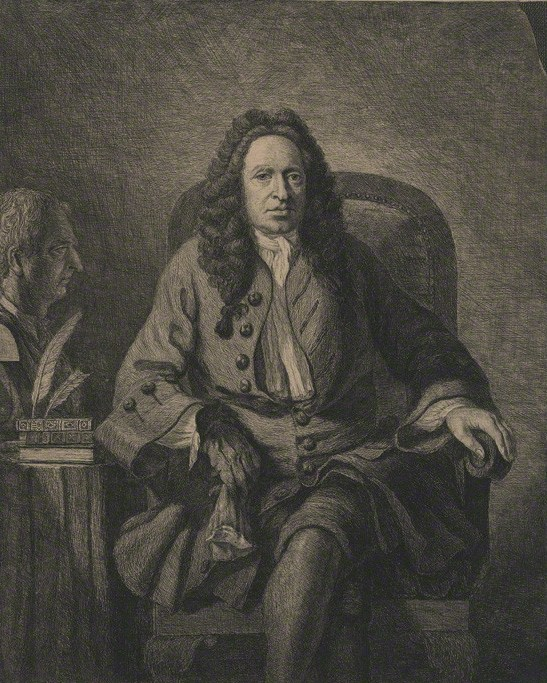
Bryan Robinson, 1750 engraving by Benjamin Wilson

== Life ==
A native of Clapham, North Yorkshire, Robinson graduated M.B. from Cambridge University in 1709, and M.D. in 1711, at Trinity College, Dublin. He was anatomical lecturer there in 1716–17, and in 1745 was appointed Regius Professor of Physic. On 5 May 1712, he was elected fellow of the King and Queen's College of Physicians in Ireland, having been put forward as a candidate on 24 August 1711. He was three times President of the College—in 1718, 1727, and 1739. He was also a member of the Irish Royal College of Surgeons, and a trustee of Dr Steevens' Hospital. He practised in Dublin, and probably attended Esther Vanhomrigh (Jonathan Swift's "Vanessa"), who left him a legacy of £15. He was on friendly terms with Swift, who recommended him as a doctor to his acquaintances. He was also a close friend of Richard Helsham and edited his Lectures on Natural Philosophy for publication after his death. After several years of failing health, which is said to have caused him to become rather irascible, he died in Dublin on 26 January 1754.

By his wife Mary, he had three sons, including Christopher (1712-1787) and Robert (1713-1770). Robert followed his father into the practice of medicine and like his father was elected President of the College of Physicians. Christopher was for many years a judge of the Court of King's Bench (Ireland) and is best remembered for his impressive collection of legal textbooks, which was purchased by the Irish Bar and formed the nucleus of the present library of the King's Inn.

== Works ==
Robinson had a reputation in his day, both as a medical and mathematical writer. His earliest work was a translation of Philippe de La Hire's New Elements of Conick Sections, 1704. In 1725 he published an account of the inoculation of five children in Dublin. The Case of Miss Rolt communicated by an Eye-witness was added in an edition printed in London in the same year. This was followed in 1732–3 by Robinson's major work, the Treatise on the Animal Economy. It was attacked by Thomas Morgan in his Mechanical Practice, and defended by the author in a Letter to Dr. Cheyne (with the third enlarged edition of 1738). Robinson was a follower of Isaac Newton, and tried to account for animal motions by his principles, and to apply them to the treatment of diseases. He attributed the production of muscular power to the vibration of an ethereal fluid pervading the animal body. His chapter on respiration presaged the discovery of oxygen.

Robinson's next work was a Dissertation on the Food and Discharges of Human Bodies, 1747. It was translated into French, and inserted in Le Pharmacien Moderne, 1750. It was followed by Observations on the Virtues and Operations of Medicines (1752). Robinson also edited Richard Helsham's Course of Lectures in Natural Philosophy, 1739 (2nd edit. 1743; reissued in 1767 and 1777).

Robinson also wrote a Dissertation on the Æther of Sir Isaac Newton (Dublin, 1743; London, 1747); and an Essay upon Money and Coins (1758), posthumously published by his sons, Christopher and Robert. Part ii. is dedicated to Henry Bilson Legge. It contains Newton's report to the Treasury on 21 September 1717 on the state of the gold and silver coinage.
