= Luke O'Neill (scientist) =

Irish biochemist (born 1964)

Luke O'Neill FRS MRIA
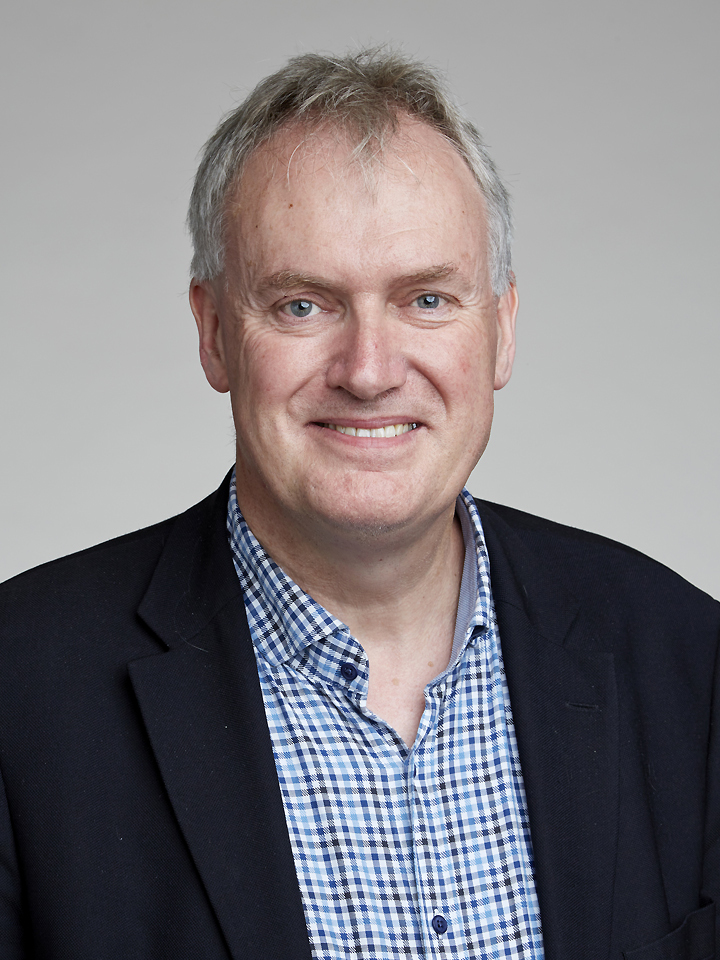
- O'Neill in 2016
- Born: 17 June 1964 (age 62); Dublin, Ireland
- Education: St Peter's College, Bray; Presentation College, Bray
- Alma mater: Trinity College Dublin; University of London
- Spouse: Margaret Worrall (m. 1993)
- Children: 2
- Awards: EMBO Member (2005)
- Scientific career
- Fields: Immunology
- Workplaces: Trinity College Dublin; Opsona Therapeutics
- Thesis: Characterisation of interleukin-1-induced prostaglandin E₂ release in human synovial cells (1988)
- Website: people.tcd.ie/laoneill

Luke Anthony John O'Neill FRS MRIA (born 17 June 1964) is an Irish biochemist. He has been a professor of biochemistry in the School of Biochemistry and Immunology at Trinity College Dublin since 2009. He is also a science writer, broadcaster, podcaster and musician.

== Early life and education ==
O'Neill was born on 17 June 1964 in Dublin, Ireland, to Kevin O'Neill and Carmel O'Neill (née Sherry). He was educated at St Peter's School and Presentation College in Bray, County Wicklow, and went to Trinity College Dublin, where he was awarded an undergraduate degree in Natural Sciences (Biochemistry) in 1985. He completed his postgraduate study at the University of London, where he was awarded a PhD in pharmacology, for research investigating the characterisation of prostaglandin E_{2} release induced by interleukin-1 in human synovial cells, in 1988. Following his PhD, he worked as a postdoctoral researcher at the Strangeways Research Laboratory in Cambridge funded by the Medical Research Council.

== Research ==
O'Neill's research investigates inflammation, a highly complex process that is provoked in the body during infection by bacteria and viruses but also in response to major trauma and injury.

He has worked on the innate immune system, which lies at the heart of inflammation. He has uncovered new molecules and biochemical processes that are triggered by sensors of infection and tissue injury, including the toll-like receptors and inflammasomes, and the signals they drive that stimulate inflammation, notably cytokines in the interleukin-1 family. He has made pioneering discoveries in the area of metabolic reprogramming in immunity and immunometabolism. He is using his findings to help in the effort to develop novel anti-inflammatory medicines. He has co-founded Inflazome with Matt Cooper which developed NLRP3 inhibitors and was acquired by Roche Ltd in 2020, and Sitryx Ltd with Houman Ashrafian, Johnathan Powell, Jeff Rathmell and Mike Rosenblum. In 2026 Sitryx announced positive topline Phase 1b clinical trial results in atopic dermatitis for SYX-5219, which targets PKM2.

In 2023 he was appointed Chief Scientific Officer of Senda Biosciences, a company pioneering programmable medicines.

His research has been funded by the Science Foundation Ireland (SFI), the European Research Council (ERC), the Wellcome Trust and GlaxoSmithKline.

== Awards and honours ==
O'Neill was awarded the Royal Dublin Society & The Irish Times Robert Boyle Medal for scientific excellence in 2009, the Royal Irish Academy Gold Medal for Life Sciences in 2012 and the European Federation of Immunology Societies (EFIS) Medal in 2014. He was elected a member of the Royal Irish Academy (MRIA) in 2004 and the European Molecular Biology Organisation (EMBO) in 2005. O'Neill was elected a Fellow of the Royal Society (FRS) in 2016.

In 2019, he won the Landsteiner Award from the Austrian Academy of Sciences. In 2021 he won the UCD Biological Society George Sigerson Award for Inspiring Aspiring Scientists.

In 2022, he was made an honorary Doctor of Science by the University of Bath and was presented with an honorary lifetime membership award by the International Cytokine and Interferon Society.

In 2023, he was appointed to the scientific council of the European Research Council, the European Union's premier funder of fundamental research and was awarded an honorary Doctor of Science degree by the University of Massachusetts Chan Medical School.

In 2024, he was made Honorary Fellow of the British Pharmacological Society.

In 2025, he was granted honorary life membership of the Royal Dublin Society, was awarded an honorary Doctor of Science degree by the Royal College of Surgeons in Ireland, and won the Ariëns Award from the Dutch Pharmacological Society. In 2026 he was the Eberly distinguished lecturer in Immunology at the University of Pittsburgh.

== Public engagement ==
O'Neill has a weekly science slot with Pat Kenny on the Irish national radio station Newstalk. A book entitled Show me the Science was published in 2023. O’Neill has presented a weekly podcast also called Show Me The Science (which is a Newstalk Original Podcast) since mid-December 2020. O’Neill appears as a guest on The Six O’Clock Show on Virgin Media One (an Irish TV channel) from time to time where he talks about science news, updates and breakthroughs—he has also appeared on the show to talk about books he has published.

He has a weekly column on science in the Sunday Independent and wrote extensively concerning the COVID-19 pandemic in the Republic of Ireland. He contracted COVID-19 himself in December 2021, and experienced symptoms.

As well as O’Neill having a weekly column in The Sunday Independent, he also regularly writes in the Irish Independent and on the Irish Independent’s website independent.ie.

O’Neill currently presents a weekly rock music show on Dublin City FM (every Wednesday from 7:00PM-10:00PM). O’Neill's show is called Resonate and he has presented his show on the station since April 2024.

O’ Neill also covered for Anton Savage on Newstalk The Anton Savage Show from time to time.

== Publications ==
In 2018, he published Humanology: A Scientist's Guide to our Amazing Existence with Gill publishers.

In 2019, he published a science book for children, The Great Irish Science Book with Gill.

In 2020, he won the An Post Irish Book of the Year Award for best popular non-fiction book for Never Mind the B*ll*cks, Here's the Science, published by Gill, which was a best seller. He also won the Science Foundation Ireland Science Communicator of the Year Award, for his media work on COVID19.

In 2021, he published Keep Calm and Trust the Science: A Remarkable Year in the Life of an Immunologist, which is his diary covering the COVID-19 pandemic.

In 2023, he published To Boldly Go Where No Book has Gone Before, with Penguin Random House. In the same year he also published What Makes Us Human: A Scientist’s Guide to our Amazing Existence with Tara O’Neill.

In 2024, he published The Great Australian Science Book.

== Personal life ==
O'Neill married Margaret Worrall in 1993. They have two sons.

O'Neill is a musician and plays with the band The Metabollix.
