= Irish Journal of Medical Science =

- Discipline: Medicine
- Language: English
- Edited by: William P Tormey

Publication details
- Former names: Dublin Journal of Medical & Chemical Science, Dublin Journal of Medical Science, Dublin Quarterly Journal of Medical Science
- History: 1832–present
- Publisher: Springer Science+Business Media on behalf of the Royal Academy of Medicine in Ireland (Ireland)
- Frequency: Quarterly
- Impact factor: 1.6 (2024)

Standard abbreviations
- ISO 4: Ir. J. Med. Sci.

Indexing
- CODEN: IJMSA
- ISSN: 0021-1265 (print); 1863-4362 (web)
- OCLC no.: 1588106

Links
- Journal homepage; online access

The Irish Journal of Medical Science is a quarterly peer-reviewed medical journal that was established in 1832 by Robert Kane as the Dublin Journal of Medical & Chemical Science. Besides Kane, it had distinguished editors like Robert James Graves and William Wilde. It is the official organ of the Royal Academy of Medicine in Ireland and published by Springer Science+Business Media.

== History ==
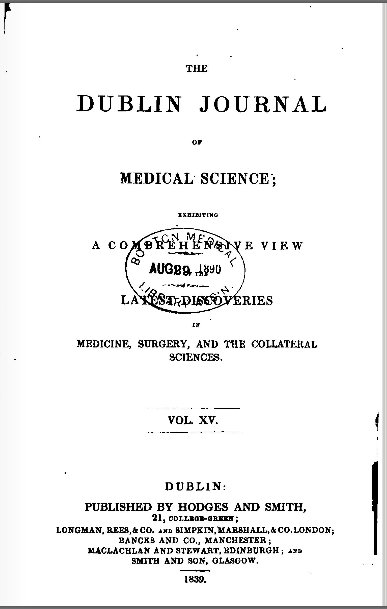
Dublin Journal of Medical Science, January 1839.

The journal was established in 1832 as the Dublin Journal of Medical & Chemical Science. It was then sequentially titled:

- Dublin Journal of Medical Science (until 1845)
- Dublin Quarterly Journal of Medical Science (from 1846 to 1871)
- Dublin Journal of Medical Science (until 1925)

In 1922 it obtained its current title and volume numbering was restarted at 1.

William Wilde became editor in 1845. Contributors included Dublin physicians Abraham Colles (1773–1840), William Stokes (1763–1845), Sir Philip Crampton (1777–1858), Thomas Ledwich (1823–1858), Arthur Jacob (1790–1874), Robert Adams (1791–1875), Stephen Myles MacSwiney (died 1890), Sir Charles Cameron (1830–1921) and Ephraim MacDowel Cosgrave (1847–1925).

James Little (1837–1916) was editor from 1869 to 1875; during his tenure, the journal changed from a quarterly to a monthly publication.

== Abstracting and indexing ==
The journal is abstracted and indexed in Academic OneFile, Chemical Abstracts Service, CSA, Current Contents/Clinical Medicine, EMBASE, Health Reference Center Academic, IBIDS, INIS Atomindex, PubMed/MEDLINE, Science Citation Index Expanded, Scopus, and Summon by Serial Solutions. According to the Journal Citation Reports, the journal has a 2016 impact factor of 1.224.

== See also ==
- Dublin Medical Press
