= Thomas Hawkesworth Ledwich =

Irish anatomist and surgeon

- Born: 1823; Waterford, Ireland
- Died: 29 September 1858 (aged 34–35); Dublin, Ireland
- Resting place: Mount Jerome Cemetery
- Education: Royal College of Surgeons in Ireland
- Occupations: anatomist, surgeon

Thomas Hawkesworth Ledwich (1823 – 29 September 1858) was an anatomist and surgeon.

== Life ==
He was born in Waterford, where his father practised law, son of Edward Ledwich and Catherine Hawkesworth, both of Queen's County (now County Laois). He was a grandson of Edward Ledwich, the controversial historian.

== Medical career ==
He studied medicine in Dublin and became a fellow of the Royal College of Surgeons in Ireland. He was a successful lecturer on anatomy and recognized the need for more facilities to teach medicine. He became lecturer in the "Original" School of Medicine in Peter St., Dublin, in 1849, which was renamed the Ledwich School in his honour after his death. This school, which by then had over 200 students, was later amalgamated with the College of Surgeons in 1889 and in 1894 incorporated into the adjacent Adelaide Hospital.

He was a frequent contributor to the Dublin Journal of Medical Science and similar journals. His great work, The Anatomy of the Human Body, was published in 1852.

On the death of Sir Philip Crampton he was appointed, in his place, surgeon to the Meath Hospital. He died at the early age of 35 and was buried in Mount Jerome Cemetery.
