= Regius Professor of Physic (Dublin) =

The Regius Professorship of Physic is a Regius Professorship in Medicine at Trinity College Dublin. "Physic" is an old word for medicine (and the root of the word "physician"): it does not refer to the study of physics.

The seat dates from at least 1637, placing it amongst the oldest academic posts at the university. Mention is made in the college's Register for 1598 of an annual grant of £40 from the government for a "Physitian's pay"; this is sometimes held to be the provision made for the Chair of Physic, but it is possible that it may have been in granted for medical services required by the troops stationed in Dublin. By 1700, the chair was considered part of the senior academic staff, alongside the Provost and Fellows (the professorships in other subjects being confined to Fellows at that time).

== Regius Professors of Physic ==
- 1: John Stearne (1656–1659, 1662–1669)
- 2: John Margetson (1670-1674) (Note: Kirkpatrick (1912) gives Margetson's forename as "Thomas".)
- 3: Ralph Howard (1674–1710)
- 4: Richard Steevens (1710-1710)
- 5: Thomas Molyneux (1711–1733)
- 6: Richard Helsham (1733–1738)
- 7: Henry Cope (1738-1742/3)
- 8: Francis Foreside (1742/3-1745)
- 9: Bryan Robinson (1745–1754)
- 10: Edward Barry (1754–1761)
- 11: William Clement (1761–1781)
- 12: Edward Hill (1781–1830)
- 13: Whitley Stokes (1830–1840)
- 14: William Stokes (1840–1878)
- 15: Alfred Hudson (1878–1880)
- 16: John Thomas Banks (1880–1898)
- 17: James Little (1898–1916)
- 18: John Mallet Purser (1917–1925)
- 19: Thomas Gillman Moorhead (1925–1956)
- 20: Victor Synge (1956–1972)
- 21: Peter Gatenby (1975-1977)
- 22: Donald Weir (1977-2000)
- 23: Owen Smith (2014-2020)
- 24: Rose Anne Kenny (2022–present)
