= Sir Henry Marsh, 1st Baronet =

Irish physician

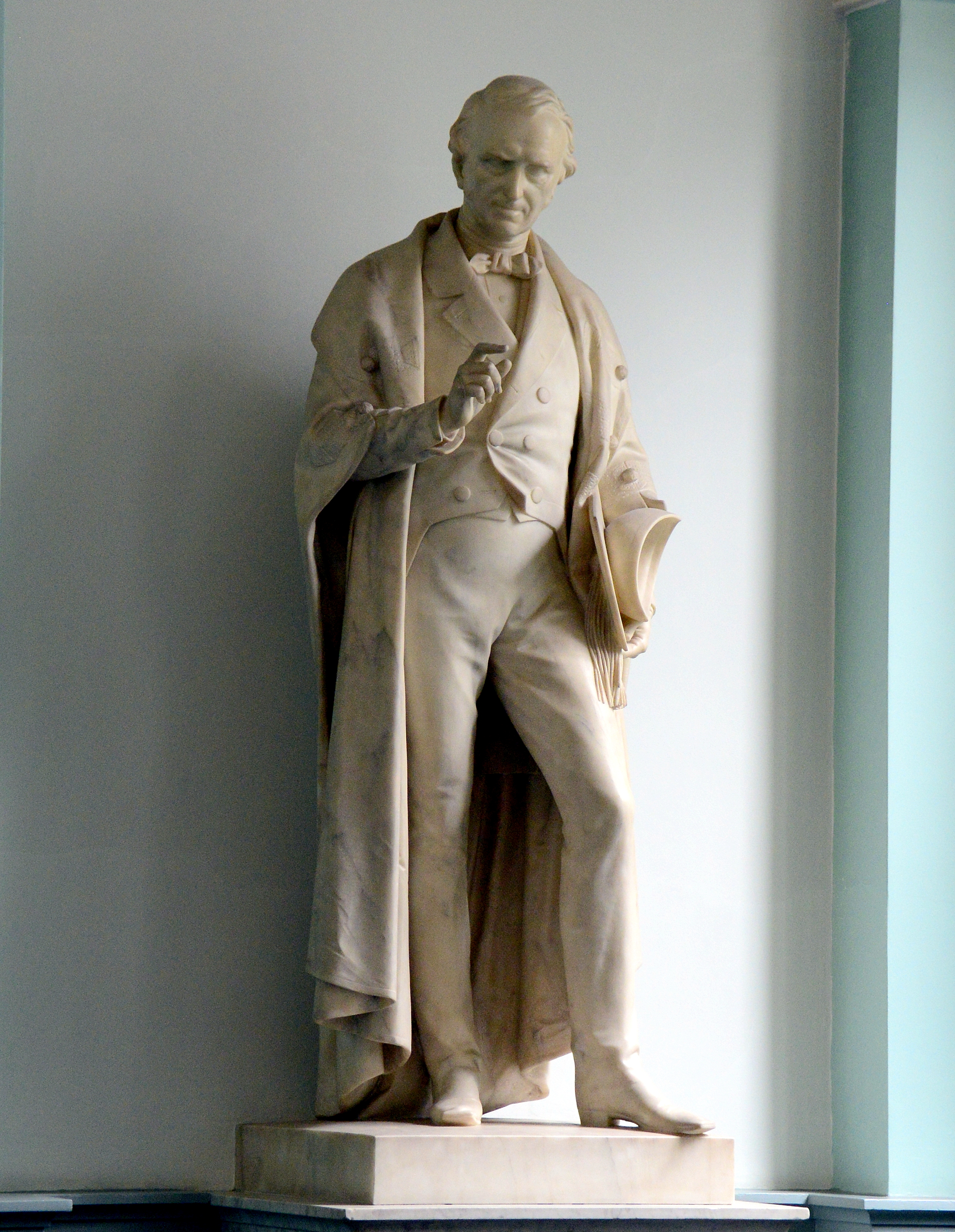
Marble statue of Sir Henry Marsh at Graves Hall, No.6 Kildare Street, the Royal College of Physicians of Ireland. Sculpted by John Henry Foley.

Sir Henry Marsh, 1st Baronet (1790 – 1 December 1860) was an Irish physician and surgeon. He was born in Loughrea, County Galway in Ireland. He was one of the medical doctors associated with Basedow's syndrome, which is also known as Marsh's disease and currently as Graves' disease.

== Biography ==
The son of the Rev. Robert Marsh of Killinane, County Galway, great-grandson of the Most Rev. Francis Marsh, Archbishop of Dublin, and Mary, daughter of Bishop Jeremy Taylor. His mother, Sophia Wolseley, was a granddaughter of Sir Richard Woolsey 1st Bt., M.P., of Mount Wolseley, County Carlow, whose wife was the daughter of Sir Thomas Molyneux, 1st Baronet, the first medical baronet created in Ireland.

Marsh originally wanted to engage in farming or in becoming a part of the clergy, before acquiring a career in surgery. After accidentally losing his right forefinger, injured during an operational procedure he was performing, he left his career in surgery. He was apprenticed to Sir Philip Crampton, whose uncle the Rev. Cecil Crampton was married to Marsh's aunt, Nicola Mary Marsh; he received his doctorate in medicine in Dublin in 1818. After some time in Paris he returned to Dublin and in 1820 was appointed physician at Dr Steevens' Hospital.

He established the Park Street Medical School in Dublin in 1822, with the cooperation of his colleagues, namely: Robert James Graves, James William Cusack, Samuel Wilmot, and Arthur Jacob, among others. He taught pathology at this school until 1827.

In 1827, he taught surgery at the Royal College of Surgeons of Ireland. He later became a medical doctor for Queen Victoria. In 1839, he was crowned a baronet. In 1840, he became president of the Royal College of Physicians of Ireland.

He died suddenly at his residence in Merrion Square, Dublin, and was buried in Mount Jerome Cemetery. Marsh had married Anne (d. 1846), daughter of Thomas Crowe, of Ennis, county Clare, and widow of William Arthur; their son, Henry, a Major in the 3rd Dragoon Guards, (born 3 April 1821, died unmarried 27 May 1868), succeeded his father as the 2nd Baronet according to some sources. Sir Henry married a second time in 1856; she survived him and there were no children of that marriage.

Baronetage of the United Kingdom
New creation	Baronet (of Dublin); 1839–1860	Succeeded by Henry Marsh
