= List of things named after George Gabriel Stokes =

Sir George Stokes (1819–1903) was an Anglo-Irish mathematical physicist whose career left a prolific body of work in mathematics and physics. Below is a collection of some of the things named after him.

== Physics ==
- Campbell–Stokes recorder
- Coriolis–Stokes force
- Stokes equation
- Stokes formula
- Stokes' law of sound attenuation
- Stokes line
- Stokes–Einstein (Stokes–Einstein–Sutherland) equation (translational diffusion)
  - Stokes–Einstein–Debye equation (rotational diffusion)

=== Fluid dynamics ===
- Stokes approximation
- Navier–Stokes equations
- Stokes first problem
- Stokes second problem
- Stokes drift
- Stokes expansion, see section about Stokes expansion
- Stokes flow
- Stokes number
- Stokes' paradox
- Stokes radius
- Stokes stream function
- Stokes wave
- Stokes (unit)
- Stokes' law
- Stokeslet

=== Optics ===
- Stokes operators (quantum)
- Stokes parameters
- Stokes relations
- Stokes shift
- Stokes vector
- Stokes lens

== Mathematics ==
- Navier–Stokes equations, see section on fluid dynamics
  - Navier–Stokes existence and smoothness
- Stokes' theorem
  - Kelvin–Stokes theorem
  - Generalized Stokes theorem
- Stokes operator
- Stokes phenomenon

== Astronomical features ==
- Stokes (lunar crater)
- Stokes (Martian crater)
