= George Stokes =

George Stokes may refer to:

- Sir George Stokes, 1st Baronet (George Gabriel Stokes, 1819–1903), Irish mathematician and physicist
  - List of things named after George Gabriel Stokes
  - Sir George Stokes Award (colloquially the Stokes Medal), awarded by the Analytical Division of the Royal Society of Chemistry, biennially
- George Henry Stokes (architect) (1826-1876), English architect
- George Henry Stokes (politician) (1876–1959), Member of Canadian Parliament
- George Thomas Stokes (1843–1898), Irish historian
- George Stokes (rugby union) (born 1995), Scottish rugby union player
- George Stokes (Medal of Honor) (1838–1919), United States Army soldier and Medal of Honor recipient
