= Cleostratus (disambiguation) =

Cleostratus (Ancient Greek: Κλεόστρατος, romanized: Kleóstratos, lit. 'renowned army') is a masculine name from Ancient Greece. Cleostratus may refer to:

- Cleostratus, an ancient Greek astronomer
- Cleostratus (crater), a lunar crater
- Cleostratus (insect), a genus of pygmy grasshoppers in the subfamily Metrodorinae
- Cleostratus (mythology), a young boy in Greek mythology
