= Repsold (crater) =

Crater on the Moon

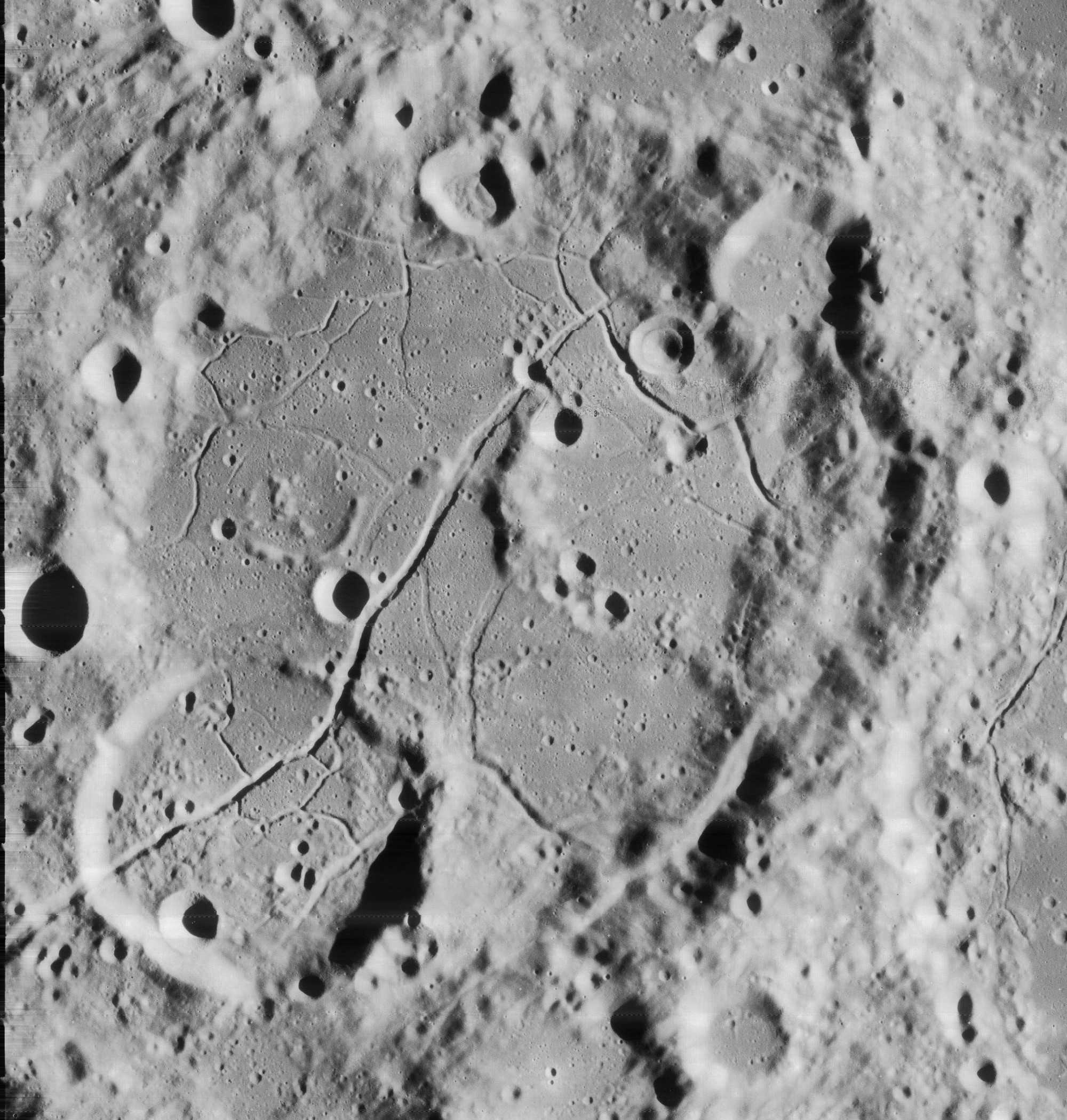
- Lunar Orbiter 4 image
- Coordinates: 51.31°N 78.41°W
- Diameter: 108.65 km (67.51 mi)
- Depth: Unknown
- Colongitude: 80° at sunrise
- Eponym: Johann G. Repsold

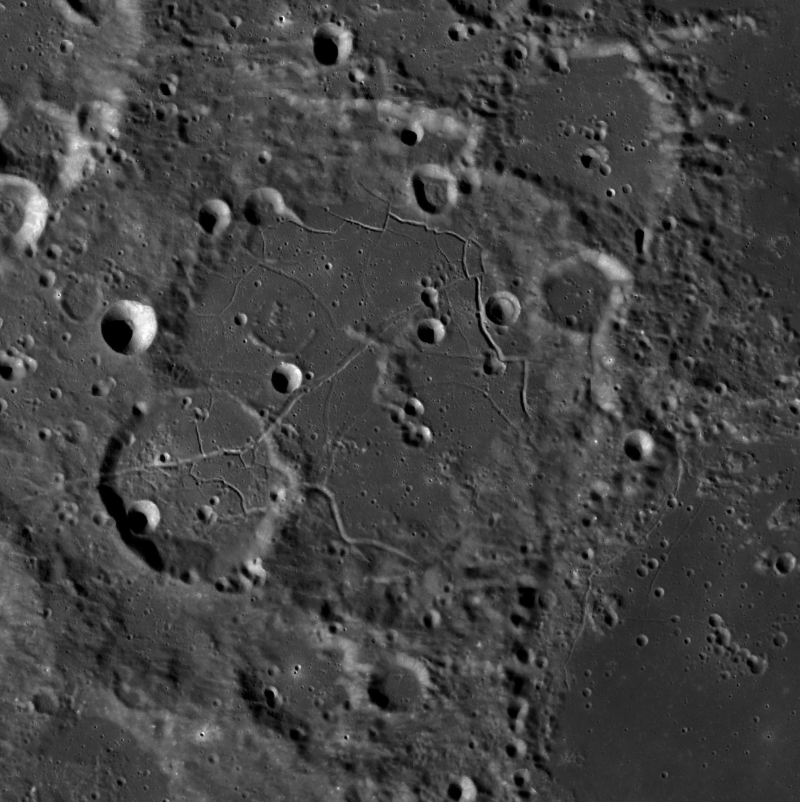
LRO image

Repsold is a lunar impact crater that is located at the western end of the Oceanus Procellarum. It lies to the northeast of the crater Galvani and southeast of the walled plain named Volta. Due to its proximity to the northwestern limb of the Moon, this crater appears highly foreshortened when viewed from the Earth.

It was named by the IAU in 1935 after Johann Georg Repsold (1770 – 1830), a German astronomer.

This crater has been heavily damaged by impacts and much of the rim has disintegrated, leaving a rugged region of small craters. The most intact section of the rim is in the southeastern part, which separates this formation from the adjacent mare. The satellite crater Repsold G overlies the southwestern part of the crater.

The interior floor of Repsold contains a prominent rille named the Rimae Repsold. It begins in the northeastern part of the floor and crosses to the southwest. The cleft then traverses Repsold G, dividing it into two, and continues west-southwest until it penetrates into the floor of Galvani. The rille is about 152 km (94 mi) long. Other fractures are present on the floor of Repsold and Repsold G.

Much of the floor of Repsold is level terrain formed by flows of basaltic lava, which then cracked to form the rille system. However the floor is marked by several small craters and there are some areas containing low ridges, including a small range in the eastern floor.

== Satellite craters ==
By convention these features are identified on lunar maps by placing the letter on the side of the crater midpoint that is closest to Repsold.

Repsold	Latitude	Longitude	Diameter
A	51.8° N	77.0° W	9 km
B	53.2° N	75.8° W	38 km
C	48.9° N	73.6° W	133 km
G	50.5° N	70.6° W	44 km
H	51.7° N	81.6° W	12 km
N	49.0° N	78.2° W	14 km
R	49.8° N	72.2° W	13 km
S	47.8° N	75.2° W	9 km
T	47.7° N	79.9° W	13 km
V	50.8° N	75.4° W	7 km
W	52.6° N	79.8° W	10 km

Repsold A is a concentric (double-walled) crater.
