= Scrín =

Scrín (Irish for 'shrine') may refer to two places in Ireland:

- Skreen, a village in County Sligo
- Skryne, a village in County Meath
