= 906 Repsolda =

Main-belt asteroid

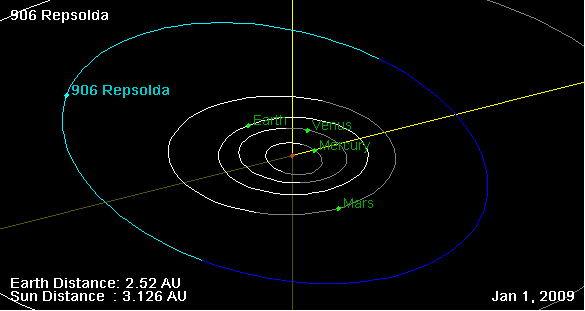
- Orbital diagram of Repsolda

Discovery
- Discovered by: A. Schwassmann
- Discovery site: Bergedorf
- Discovery date: 30 October 1918

Designations
- Alternative designations: 1918 ET

Orbital characteristics
- Epoch 31 July 2016 (JD 2457600.5)
- Uncertainty parameter 0
- Observation arc: 100.01 yr (36529 days)
- Aphelion: 3.1427 AU (470.14 Gm)
- Perihelion: 2.6457 AU (395.79 Gm)
- Semi-major axis: 2.8942 AU (432.97 Gm)
- Eccentricity: 0.085868
- Orbital period (sidereal): 4.92 yr (1798.4 d)
- Mean anomaly: 0.00772276°
- Mean motion: 0° 12^{m} 0.648^{s} / day
- Inclination: 11.783°
- Longitude of ascending node: 40.209°
- Argument of perihelion: 295.175°

Physical characteristics
- Mean diameter: 69.5 km
- Synodic rotation period: 15.368 h (0.6403 d)
- Absolute magnitude (H): 9.3

906 Repsolda is a minor planet orbiting the Sun. It is named for the German astronomer and fireman Johann Georg Repsold (1770–1830), who founded and ran Hamburg Observatory.
