= Rayleigh problem =

Fluid dynamics problem

In fluid dynamics, Rayleigh problem also known as Stokes first problem is a problem of determining the flow created by a sudden movement of an infinitely long plate from rest, named after Lord Rayleigh and Sir George Stokes. This is considered as one of the simplest unsteady problems that have an exact solution for the Navier-Stokes equations. The impulse movement of semi-infinite plate was studied by Keith Stewartson.

== Flow description ==
Consider an infinitely long plate which is suddenly made to move with constant velocity $U$ in the $x$ direction, which is located at $y=0$ in an infinite domain of fluid, which is at rest initially everywhere. The incompressible Navier-Stokes equations reduce to

$$\frac{\partial u}{\partial t} = \nu \frac{\partial^2 u}{\partial y^2}$$

where $\nu$ is the kinematic viscosity. The initial and the no-slip condition on the wall are

$$u(y,0) = 0, \quad u(0,t>0) = U, \quad u(\infty,t>0) = 0,$$

the last condition is due to the fact that the motion at $y=0$ is not felt at infinity. The flow is only due to the motion of the plate, there is no imposed pressure gradient.

=== Self-Similar solution ===
The problem on the whole is similar to the one dimensional heat conduction problem. Hence a self-similar variable can be introduced

$$\eta = \frac{y}{\sqrt{\nu t}}, \quad f(\eta) = \frac{u}{U}$$

Substituting this into the partial differential equation reduces it to an ordinary differential equation

$$f'' + \frac{1}{2}\eta f' =0$$

with boundary conditions

$$f(0)= 1, \quad f(\infty) =0$$

The solution to the above problem can be written in terms of complementary error function

$$u = U\mathrm{erfc} \left(\frac{y}{\sqrt{4\nu t}}\right)$$

The force per unit area exerted on the plate is

$$F = \mu \left(\frac{\partial u}{\partial y}\right)_{y=0} = -\rho \sqrt{\frac{\nu U^2}{\pi t}}$$

== Arbitrary wall motion ==
Instead of using a step boundary condition for the wall movement, the velocity of the wall can be prescribed as an arbitrary function of time, i.e., $U=f(t)$. Then the solution is given by

$$u(y,t) = \int_0^t \frac{f(\tau)}{2\sqrt{\pi\nu}}\frac{y}{(t-\tau)^{3/2}}e^{- \frac{y^2}{4\nu(t-\tau)}}d\tau.$$

== Rayleigh's problem in cylindrical geometry ==
=== Rotating cylinder ===
Consider an infinitely long cylinder of radius $a$ starts rotating suddenly at time $t=0$ with an angular velocity $\Omega$. Then the velocity in the $\theta$ direction is given by

$$v_\theta = \frac{a\Omega}{2\pi i}\int_{-i\infty}^{i\infty} \frac{K_1(r\sqrt{s/\nu})}{K_1(a\sqrt{s/\nu})}e^{st}\frac{ds}{s}$$

where $K_1$ is the modified Bessel function of the second kind. As $t\rightarrow\infty$, the solution approaches that of a rigid vortex. The force per unit area exerted on the cylinder is

$$F = \mu \left(\frac{\partial v_\theta}{\partial r}-\frac{v_\theta}{r}\right)_{r=a} = \frac{\rho a^2\Omega}{t}e^{-\frac{a^2}{2\nu t}}I_0\left(\frac{a^2}{2\nu t}\right)-2\mu\Omega$$

where $I_0$ is the modified Bessel function of the first kind.

=== Sliding cylinder ===
Exact solution is also available when the cylinder starts to slide in the axial direction with constant velocity $U$. If we consider the cylinder axis to be in $x$ direction, then the solution is given by

$$u = \frac{U}{2\pi i}\int_{-i\infty}^{i\infty} \frac{K_0(r\sqrt{s/\nu})}{K_0(a\sqrt{s/\nu})}e^{st}\frac{ds}{s}.$$

== See also ==
- Stokes problem
