= Regnault (crater) =

Crater on the Moon

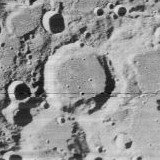
- Oblique Lunar Orbiter 4 image
- Coordinates: 54.1°N 88.0°W
- Diameter: 47 km
- Depth: Unknown
- Colongitude: 88° at sunrise
- Eponym: Henri V. Regnault

Regnault is a lunar impact crater that is located close to the northwest limb of the Moon. It lies across the western rim of a walled plain called Volta, with the slightly smaller crater Stokes attached to the southern outer rim. Due to its location, Regnault is not favorably placed for viewing from the Earth. It is seen at a very oblique angle, limiting the detail that can be viewed. The visibility of this crater is also affected by libration of the Moon.

As the eastern rim of Regnault lies across the rim of Volta, that eastern rim is somewhat less prominent than the western half. The rim has not been heavily eroded, although a small craterlet lies across the northern rim. Where it joins Stokes to the south, the rim has been straightened slightly, and ejecta lies across part of the interior floor. The inner walls of Regnault are relatively simple slopes that lead down to the level interior floor. This base is marked only by a few tiny craters and has no central peak.

== Satellite craters ==
By convention these features are identified on lunar maps by placing the letter on the side of the crater midpoint that is closest to Regnault.

Regnault	Latitude	Longitude	Diameter
C	55.2° N	89.2° W	14 km
W	53.5° N	89.9° W	15 km
