= John Stokes (archdeacon of Armagh) =

John Whitley Stokes (6 January 1801, Dublin – 27 November 1883, Armagh) was Archdeacon of Armagh from 1842 until his death.

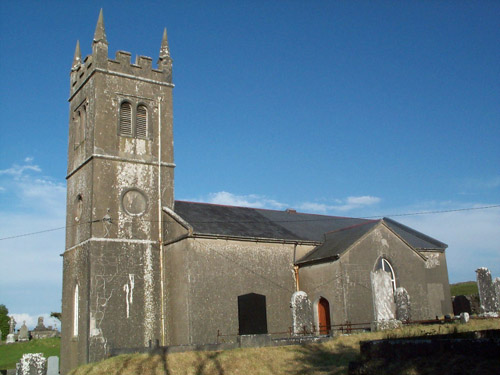
Skreen, County Sligo, where John was born

He was born in Skreen, County Sligo, the second born and eldest son of the eight children of the Reverend Gabriel Stokes (died 1834), rector of the parish, and his wife Elizabeth Haughton, daughter of the Reverend John Haughton. His father's profound Evangelical views had a strong influence on all four of his sons, three of whom became clergymen. The youngest of the four brothers was the noted physicist Sir George Stokes, 1st Baronet. John and George remained close, and George, who was much younger, lived in John's house while he was at school in Dublin. Their mother was remembered in the family as "beautiful, but very stern".

Stokes was educated at Trinity College, Dublin. He was for many years Rector of Clogherny.

He married in 1827 Caroline Elrington, daughter of Thomas Elrington, Bishop of Ferns and Leighlin and Charlotte Preston. She died in 1868. They had one son, Thomas Gabriel Stokes, who followed his father and grandfather into the Church, and became Chancellor of the Diocese of Armagh. He married Sophia Fenwick of County Donegal and had a numerous family.

There is a memorial to Archdeacon Stokes on the north wall of the north transept of St Patrick's Cathedral, Armagh.

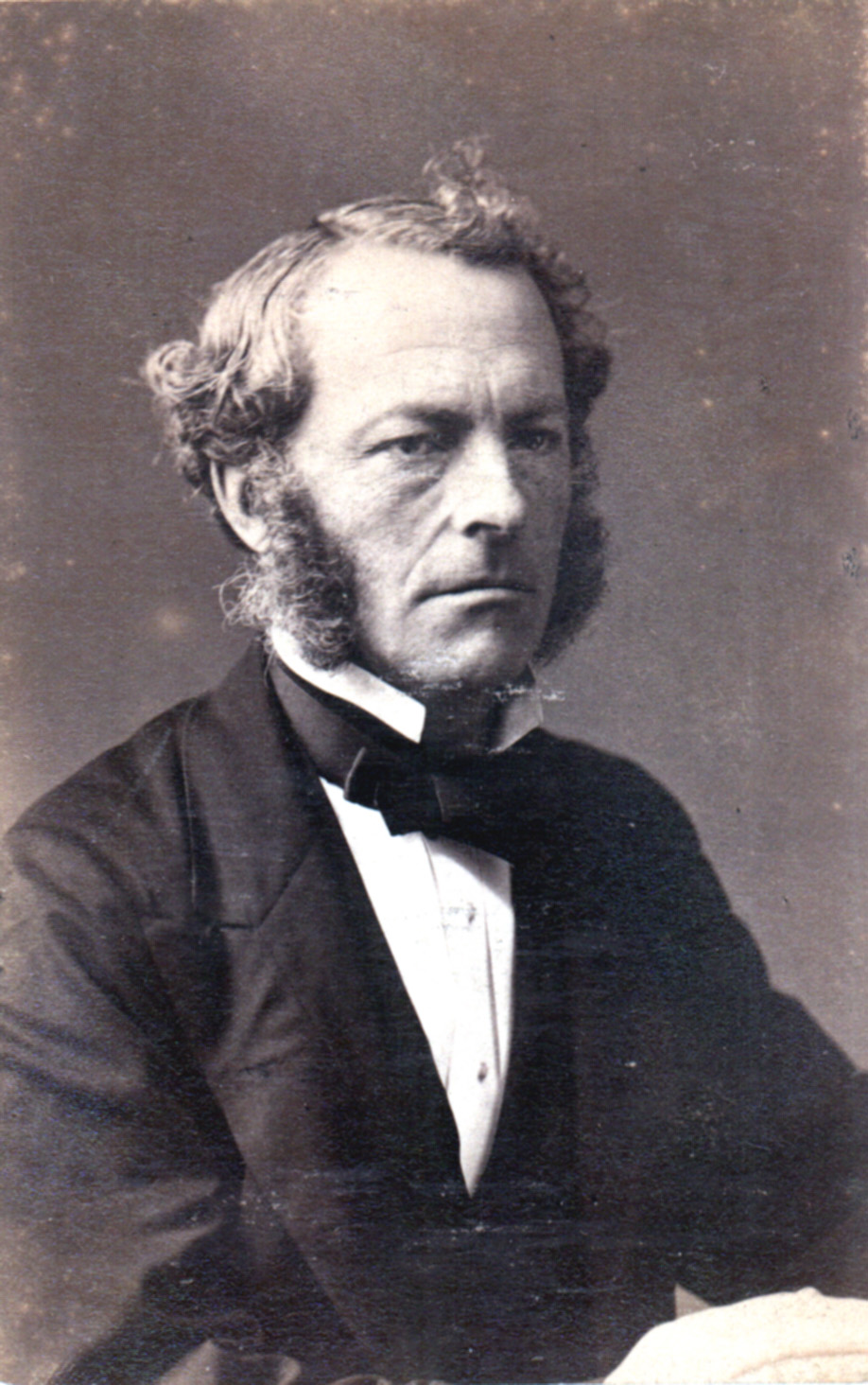
Sir George Stokes, 1st Baronet, the noted physicist, John's younger brother
