= Stokes baronets =

Extinct baronetcy in the Baronetage of the United Kingdom

Escutcheon of the Stokes baronets of Lensfield Cottage

The Stokes baronetcy, of Lensfield Cottage in the Parish of Saint Paul in the Town of Cambridge, was a title in the Baronetage of the United Kingdom. It was created on 6 July 1889 for the Irish mathematician and physicist George Stokes.

The title became extinct on the death of the 2nd Baronet in 1916.

== Stokes baronets, of Lensfield Cottage (1889) ==
- Sir George Gabriel Stokes, 1st Baronet (1819–1903)
- Sir Arthur Stokes, 2nd Baronet (1858–1916)

== Notes ==
Baronetage of the United Kingdom
Preceded by Porter baronets	Stokes baronets of Lensfield Cottage; 6 July 1889	Succeeded by Boehm baronets
