= Boehm-Boteler baronets =

Extinct baronetcy in the Baronetage of the United Kingdom

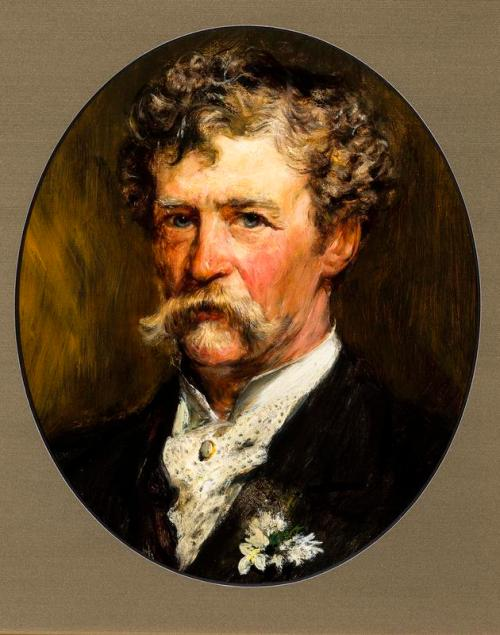
Joseph Boehm, 1883 portrait

The Boehm, later Boehm-Boteler baronetcy, of Wetherby Gardens in the Parish of St Mary Abbots, Kensington, in the County of London, was a title in the Baronetage of the United Kingdom. It was created on 13 July 1889 for the sculptor Joseph Boehm.

His son, the second Baronet, assumed by deed poll the additional surname of Boteler in 1918, which was that of his mother Louise Frances Boteler. The title became extinct on his death in 1928.

== Boehm, later Boehm-Boteler baronets, of Wetherby Gardens (1889) ==
- Sir Joseph Edgar Boehm, 1st Baronet (1834–1890)
- Sir Edgar Collins Boehm-Boteler, 2nd Baronet (1869–1928)

== Notes ==
Baronetage of the United Kingdom
Preceded by Stokes baronets	Boehm baronets of Wetherby Gardens; 13 July 1889	Succeeded by Mackinnon baronets
