= Xenophanes (crater) =

Lunar impact crater

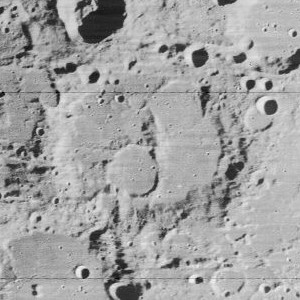
- Oblique Lunar Orbiter 4 image
- Coordinates: 57.5°N 82.0°W
- Diameter: 125 km
- Depth: 3.2 km
- Colongitude: 86° at sunrise
- Eponym: Xenophanes

Xenophanes is a lunar impact crater that is located along the northwestern limb of the Moon. It is nearly attached to Volta, a similar formation to the south-southwest. To the northeast is the smaller crater Cleostratus. Xenophanes is significantly foreshortened when viewed from the Earth, hindering observation.

It is a worn and eroded crater with a battered outer rim that is overlaid by several smaller craters. The rim is a circular range of rugged, irregular ground that is notched in places along the inner wall. A chain of small craters lies along the northern and northeastern rim. At the west end, a pair of clefts in the rim nearly join the floor to the surface beyond. To the northeast, Xenophanes A is an impact crater with a sharp rim and a rough interior.

The interior surface is irregular, but sections have been resurfaced by basaltic lava. A pair of flooded crater rims lie along the southern and northeast sections of the interior. The interior is more level and less rough at the eastern end.

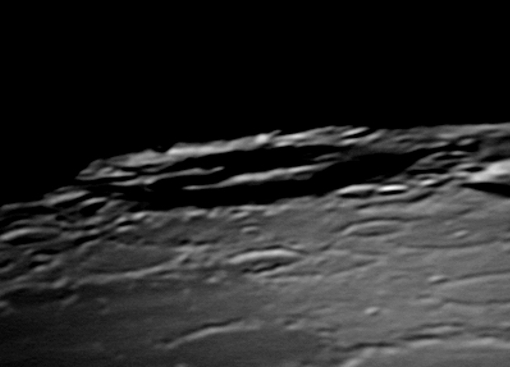
Xenophanes captured with a telescope

== Satellite craters ==
By convention these features are identified on lunar maps by placing the letter on the side of the crater midpoint that is closest to Xenophanes.

Xenophanes	Latitude	Longitude	Diameter
A	60.1° N	84.8° W	42 km
B	59.4° N	80.5° W	15 km
C	59.6° N	78.7° W	8 km
D	58.6° N	77.4° W	12 km
E	58.1° N	85.8° W	12 km
F	56.7° N	73.2° W	24 km
G	56.9° N	75.7° W	7 km
K	58.7° N	84.5° W	13 km
L	54.8° N	78.6° W	21 km
M	54.8° N	79.6° W	9 km
