= Frederick Bramwell =

British civil and mechanical engineer

Sir Frederick Bramwell, Bt
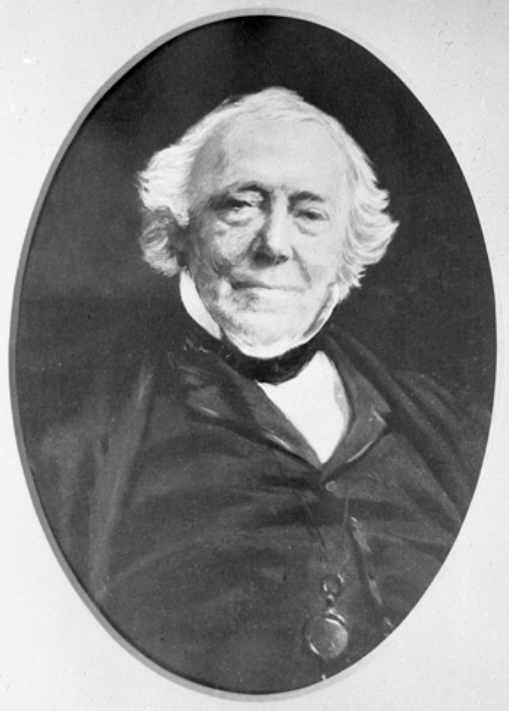
- Born: 17 March 1818; United Kingdom
- Died: 30 November 1903 (aged 85); United Kingdom
- Engineering career
- Discipline: Civil, mechanical
- Institutions: Institution of Civil Engineers (president), Institution of Mechanical Engineers (president), Royal Society of Arts (president), Royal Society, (fellow)

Sir Frederick Joseph Bramwell, 1st Baronet FRS FRSA (17 March 1818 – 30 November 1903) was a British civil and mechanical engineer. He became a Fellow of the Royal Society in 1873 and served as president of the Institution of Civil Engineers between December 1884 and May 1886 and the president of the British Association for the Advancement of Science in 1888. He was knighted in 1881 and created a baronet on 25 January 1889.

Bramwell trained as an engineer and studied steam propulsion. In 1843 he constructed a locomotive for the Stockton and Darlington Railway; set up his own business concentrating on legal and consultative work (1853). He was the first engineer to practise as a technical advocate and later was adviser to the London water companies.

Escutcheon of the Bramwell baronets of Hyde Park Gate

== Family ==
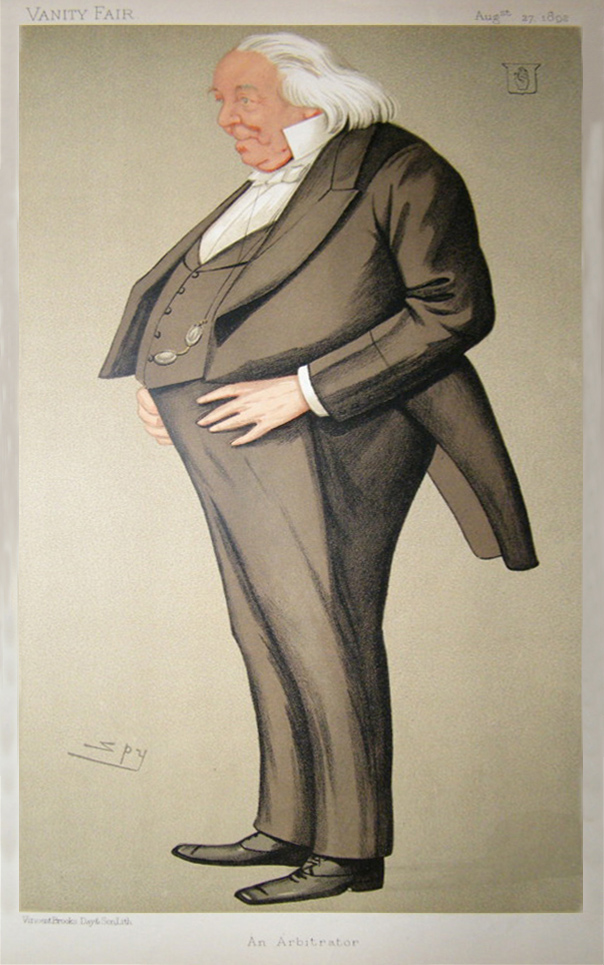
A caricature of Frederick Bramwell by Leslie Ward, published in Vanity Fair in 1892

He was the son of George Bramwell, a partner in Dorrien and Co. Bankers, and his wife Harriet, and the younger brother of Sir George William Wilshere Bramwell. He married on 29 March 1847, Harriet Leonara Frith (his cousin), daughter of Joseph Frith. There were three daughters to the marriage, with Eldred marrying the scientist, Sir Victor Horsley.

Bramwell died of a cerebral haemorrhage on 30 November 1903, in London, and was buried at Hever, Kent.

== Works ==
- "On the Steam-engine". Science Lectures at South Kensington. Vol. I. London: Macmillan & Company. 1878. pp. 111–172.
- Our big guns (1886, address to the Birmingham and Midland Institute) from his work as a civilian member of the Ordnance Committee.

Professional and academic associations
Preceded by Carl Wilhelm Siemens	President of the Institution of Mechanical Engineers; 1874–1875	Succeeded by Thomas Hawksley
Preceded by Joseph Bazalgette	President of the Institution of Civil Engineers; December 1884 – May 1886	Succeeded by Edward Woods
Preceded by Sir Henry Enfield Roscoe	President of the British Association for the Advancement of Science; 1888	Succeeded by Sir William Henry Flower
Baronetage of the United Kingdom
New creation	Baronet (of Hyde Park Gate); 1889–1903	Extinct
Preceded by King baronets	Bramwell baronets of Hyde Park Gate; 25 January 1889	Succeeded by Porter baronets
