= Galvani (crater) =

Crater on the Moon

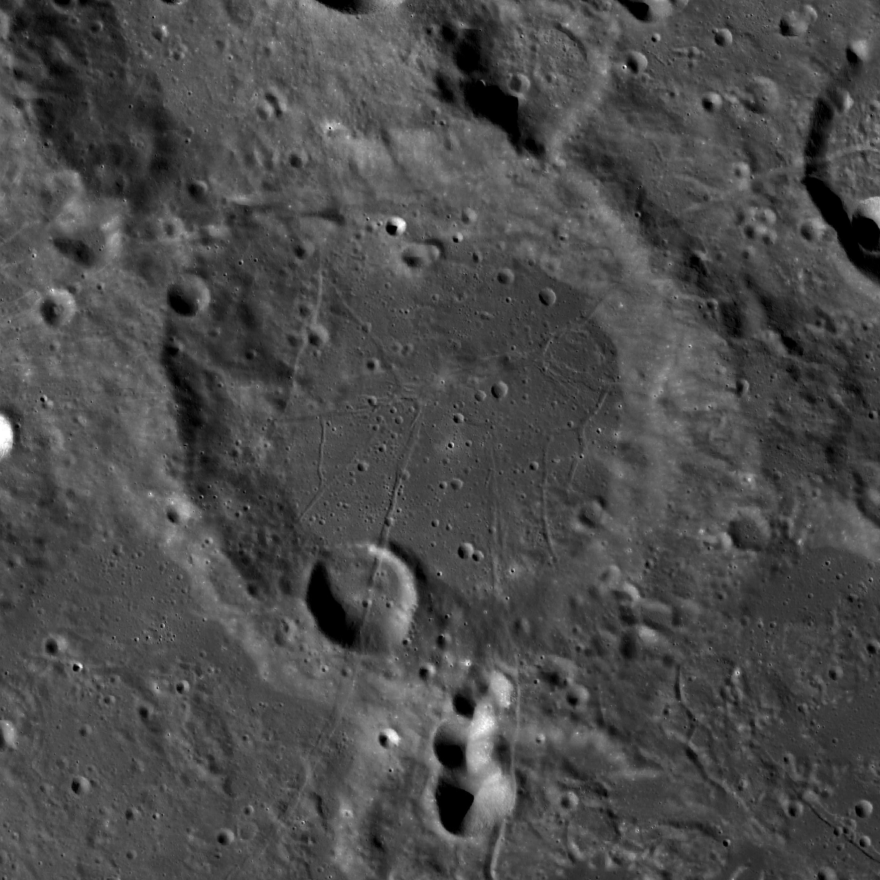
- LRO image
- Coordinates: 49.51°N 84.56°W
- Diameter: 76.83 km (47.74 mi)
- Depth: Unknown
- Colongitude: 86° at sunrise
- Eponym: Luigi Galvani

Galvani is a lunar impact crater that lies close to the northwestern limb of the Moon, due south of the larger walled plain named Volta. It partly overlies the southeast rim of the crater Langley, which occupies half the gap between Volta and Galvani. To the northeast is the large walled plain Repsold, and to the west-southwest, on the far side of the Moon, is the crater McLaughlin.

Due to its location, Galvani is viewed from an oblique angle from the Earth, and it appears highly foreshortened. The visibility of this crater is affected by libration of the Moon, so that at times this crater can be hidden from sight.

The rim of Galvani is worn and rounded, with a crater lying along the inner wall to the southwest. The southwestern rim has been modified, and appears straighter than the otherwise circular shape of the perimeter. The inner wall is wider along the western side compared to the east, and thus the midpoint of the level interior floor is offset slightly to the east. A rille from the Rimae Repsold system crosses the northeastern rim and traverses the interior, forking near the midpoint to continue towards the west-southwest and the south. The crater floor is otherwise fractured as well.

This feature is named after the Italian physicist Luigi Galvani (1737-1798). Its designation was officially adopted by the International Astronomical Union in 1961.

== Satellite craters ==
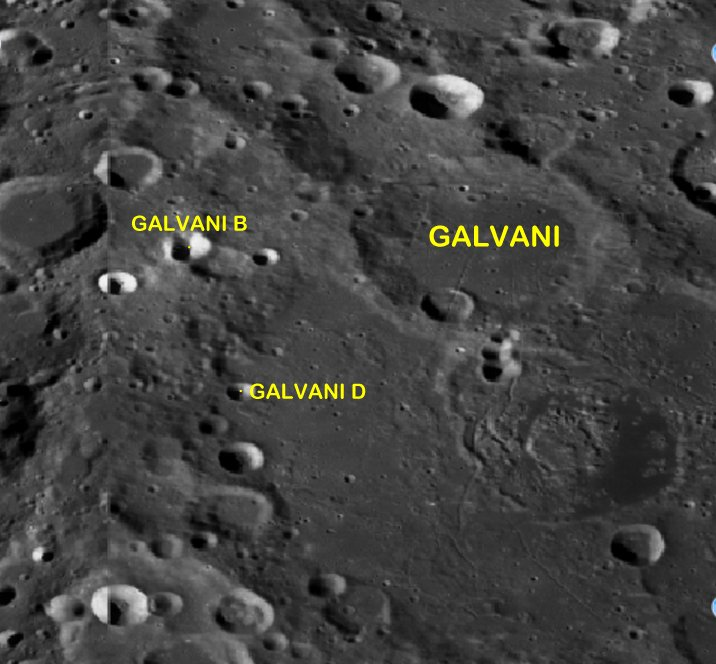
Galvani satellite features and surroundings

By convention these features are identified on lunar maps by placing the letter on the side of the crater midpoint that is closest to Galvani.

| Galvani | Latitude | Longitude | Diameter |
|---|---|---|---|
| B | 49.5° N | 89.0° W | 15 km |
| D | 47.8° N | 88.3° W | 13 km |
