= Thady Connellan =

Irish school-teacher, poet and historian

Thaddeus Connellan (Thady Connellan; Tadhg Ó Coinnialláin)
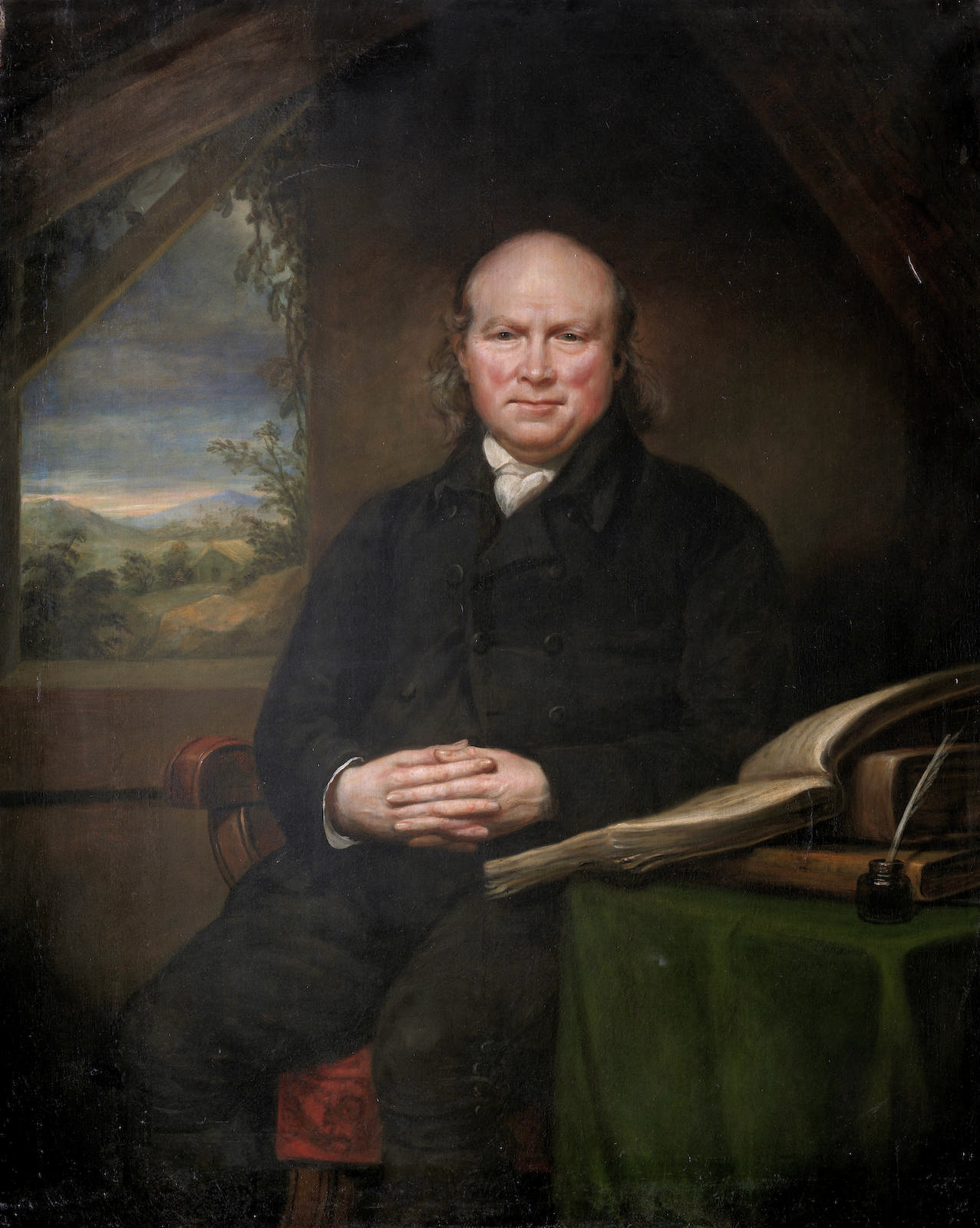
- Thaddeus Connellan (James Northcote, 1824)
- Born: 1780; Skreen County Sligo, Ireland
- Died: 1854 (aged 73–74); Sligo
- Occupations: Schoolteacher; translator; poet

Thaddeus "Thady" Connellan (Irish: Tadhg Ó Coinnialláin) (1780–1854) was an Irish school-teacher, poet and historian.

== Life ==
He was born in Skreen, County Sligo, and was a relative of the scholar Owen Connellan. He started a school of his own, but had more success when he became principal of a school established by the Rev. Albert Blest (father of William Cunningham Blest), a Baptist, supported by the London Hibernian Society in Greenville, Coolaney, in the early 1800s. Like his relative Owen he left the Catholic church and embraced Protestantism, around 1808. Among other works he produced an Irish-English dictionary and edited a series of song-books.

He died at Sligo, on 25 July 1854.

== Publications ==
- English - Irish Dictionary intended for use of Schools, Dublin, 1814.
- Seanraite Sholaim a Ghaoidheilge agus mBearla – The Proverbs of Solomon in Irish and English, (1815)
- Litir an Ríogh a nGaoidheilge, ó Shaicsbhearla, 1825.
- An duanaire. Fonna seanma. A selection of Irish melodies, poems and moral epigrams, (1829)
