= Langley (crater) =

Crater on the Moon

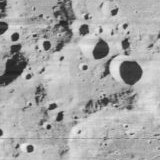
- Oblique Lunar Orbiter 4 image
- Coordinates: 51.1°N 86.3°W
- Diameter: 59 km
- Depth: Unknown
- Colongitude: 87° at sunrise
- Eponym: Samuel P. Langley

Langley is a lunar impact crater that is located close to the northwestern limb of the Moon, and from the Earth is viewed edge-on. It is located in the gap between the crater Galvani, which lies across the southeastern rim, and Volta along the northeastern rim. Just to the northwest is Stokes.

The rim of Langley has been heavily damaged by nearby impacts, and the result is an irregular perimeter that has been reshaped and heavily eroded. Galvani intrudes into the southeastern part of the floor, having overlaid that section of the rim. To the northeast is a pair of craters designated Langley J and Langley K. These lie proximal to each other, along the inner side of the rim shared with Volta. The western arc of the rim is the most intact section, although several small craters lie across the rim and along the sides. The interior floor of Langley is relatively featureless, with only a few craterlets.

This crater is named after American astronomer and physicist Samuel P. Langley (1834–1906).

== Satellite craters ==
By convention these features are identified on lunar maps by placing the letter on the side of the crater midpoint that is closest to Langley.

Langley	Latitude	Longitude	Diameter
J	51.7° N	85.2° W	20 km
K	52.0° N	86.3° W	20 km
