= Johann Georg Repsold =

German astronomer (1770–1830)

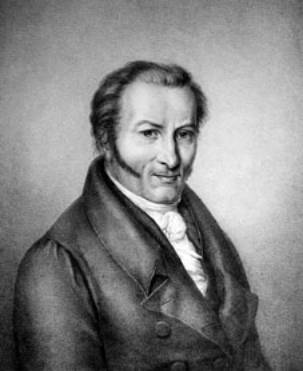
Johann Georg Repsold (1828), by Gerdt Hardorff

Johann Georg Repsold (19 September 1770 – 14 January 1830) was a German manufacturer of scientific instruments, astronomer, and fireman. He began to make astronomic instruments mainly for his own use. His third son Adolf Repsold continued the well-known astronomical instrument firm as the A. & G. Repsold company, which later became A. Repsold und Söhne (Repsold & sons).

Repsold was born in Wremen (today near Bremerhaven) to the clergyman Johann Repsold and his wife Charlotte Friederike Böhmer. Repsold initially studied for a career in theology but moved to study mathematics and drawing under Reinhard Woltmann, an Elbe River pilot who later worked for the Hamburg waterworks. In 1795 Repsold became a river pilot and in 1799 he married Eleonore Scharff, daughter of a captain in the fire brigade and in the same year, he joined the fire brigade of Hamburg, too. He met the Swiss astronomer Johann Caspar Horner, who was making measurements in the Elbe river and discovered a common interest in astronomic instrument design and in 1800 he established a workshop. He began to make optical instruments as well and began a correspondence with Carl Friedrich Gauss on achromatic doublets. In 1802 he began to build a private observatory, and collaborated in astronomical observations with Heinrich Christian Schumacher. In 1803 he made a transit instrument for Horner and in 1815 Repsold made a meridian circle for Gauss at the Göttingen observatory. Gauss gave Repsold the plan for a heliotrope, which was made in 1821. The Hamburg observatory was destroyed in the Napoleonic Wars in 1811. In 1825 a new observatory was completed at the town wall, and Repsold became the director, supplying instruments at his own expense with other funding from the city of Hamburg.

Repsold died in 1830 when he was struck by a falling beam while supervising firefighting at a major fire. The expense of running the observatory was subsequently taken over by the local government, and the new director was Carl Ludwig Christian Rümker. Repsold's observatory was demolished upon the completion of a new observatory, the modern Hamburg Observatory at Bergedorf, between 1906 and 1912. The site is now occupied by the Hamburg Museum. A bronze bust was set up in his honour beside the Hamburg state astronomical observatory.

His third son Adolf Repsold took over position in the Hamburg fire-brigade and having apprenticed with his father, he and his brother Georg began the instrument-making business of A. and G. Repsold. In 1831, they made an instrument for Friedrich Wilhelm Bessel. The family instrument business was continued by Adolf's son Johann Adolf Repsold (1838-1919).

The crater Repsold on the Moon is named after him, as is the asteroid 906 Repsolda.
