= Porter baronets of Frimley (1889) =

Escutcheon of the Porter baronets of Frimley

The Porter baronetcy, of Frimley in the County of Surrey, was created in the Baronetage of the United Kingdom on 27 June 1889 for the surgeon George Porter.

The title became extinct on the death of the 3rd Baronet in 1974.

== Porter baronets, of Frimley (1889) ==
- Sir George Hornidge Porter, 1st Baronet (1822–1895)
- Sir William Henry Porter, 2nd Baronet (1862–1935)
- Sir George Swinburne Porter, 3rd Baronet (1908–1974)

== Notes ==
Baronetage of the United Kingdom
Preceded by Bramwell baronets	Porter baronets of Frimley; 27 June 1889	Succeeded by Stokes baronets
