= Octaeteris =

Astronomical cycle of eight solar years

In astronomy, an octaeteris (Greek: ὀκταετηρίς, plural: octaeterides) is the period of eight solar years after which the moon phase occurs on the same day of the year plus one or two days.

This period is also in a very good synchronicity with five Venusian visibility cycles (the Venusian synodic period) and thirteen Venusian revolutions around the Sun (Venusian sidereal period). This means, that if Venus is visible beside the Moon, after eight years the two will be again close together near the same date of the calendar.

Comparison of differing parts of the octaeteris
Astronomical period	Number in an octaeteris	Overall duration (Earth days)
Tropical year	8	2 921.93754
Synodic lunar month	99	2 923.528230
Sidereal lunar month	107	2 923.417787
Venusian synodic period	5	2 919.6
Venusian sidereal period	13	2 921.07595

The octaeteris, also known as oktaeteris, was noted by Cleostratus in ancient Greece as a 2 923 1 /2 day cycle. The octaeteris is the calendar used for the Olympic games; if one Olympiad was 50 months long, the next would be 49 lunar months long. This octaeteris calendar is used for the Olympic dial of the Antikythera mechanism, to determine the time of the Olympic games and other Greek festivities.

== See also ==
- Metonic cycle
- Eclipse cycle
