= Cleostratus (crater) =

Crater on the Moon

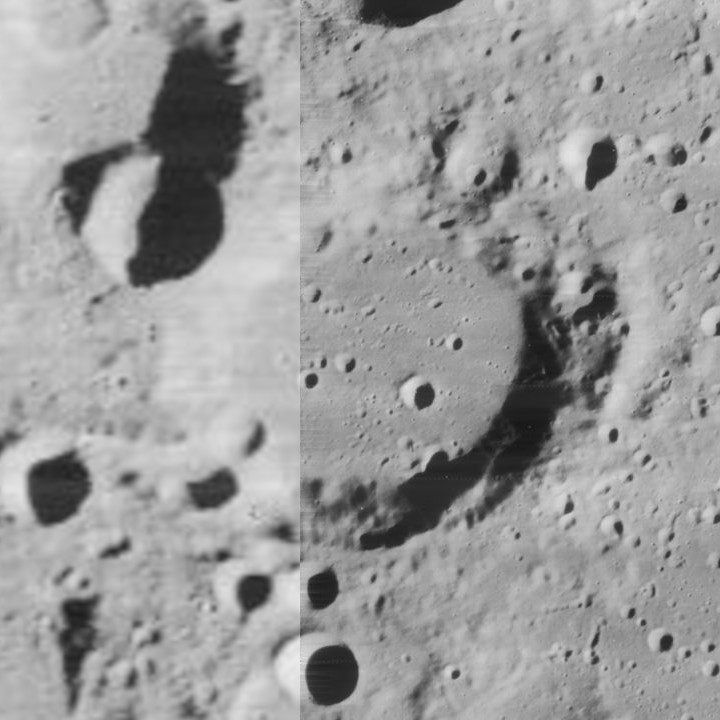
- Oblique Lunar Orbiter 4 image
- Coordinates: 60.4°N 77.0°W
- Diameter: 63.23 km (39.29 mi)
- Depth: 2.2 km (1.4 mi)
- Colongitude: 78° at sunrise
- Eponym: Cleostratus

Cleostratus is a lunar impact crater near the northwest limb of the Moon. It lies to the northeast of the crater Xenophanes, and west-southwest of the prominent Pythagoras. From the Earth this crater appears highly elongated due to foreshortening.

The rim of this crater has become soft-shouldered due to steady impact erosion, and the formation is now just a depression in the surface surrounded by an eroded rise. A pair of small craters lie across the southwest rim, forming part of a short chain of craters leading to the west. Along the crest of the southern rim is a linear ridge. The satellite crater Cleostratus E is attached to the northwest rim, and intrudes slightly into the inner wall. The interior floor of this crater is flat and nearly featureless, having only a few tiny craterlets marking the surface.

This formation is named after Greek astronomer Cleostratus (unkn-c. 500 B.C.). His name was included in the lunar nomenclature of the Italian astronomer Giovanni B. Riccioli in 1651. Its designation was formally adopted by the International Astronomical Union in 1935.

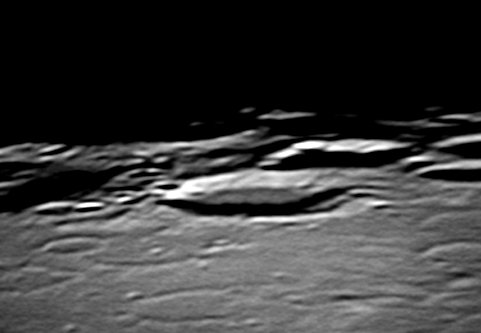
Cleostratus (center) in a telescopic photograph

== Satellite craters ==
By convention these features are identified on lunar maps by placing the letter on the side of the crater midpoint that is closest to Cleostratus.

Cleostratus	Latitude	Longitude	Diameter
A	62.7° N	77.3° W	35 km
E	60.9° N	79.6° W	21 km
F	61.5° N	80.4° W	50 km
H	61.2° N	81.9° W	13 km
J	61.3° N	83.8° W	20 km
K	62.0° N	81.1° W	17 km
L	62.2° N	79.3° W	11 km
M	61.5° N	74.9° W	9 km
N	60.6° N	73.1° W	4 km
P	59.6° N	72.9° W	7 km
R	58.9° N	72.9° W	6 km

The satellite feature A includes a permanently shadowed region where the sunlight never reaches.
