= Stokes relations =

In physical optics, the Stokes relations, named after Sir George Gabriel Stokes, describe the relative phase of light reflected at a boundary between materials of different refractive indices. They also relate the transmission and reflection coefficients for the interaction. Their derivation relies on a time-reversal argument, so they only work when there is no absorption in the system.

A reflection of the incoming field (E) is transmitted at the dielectric boundary to give rE and tE (where r and t are the amplitude reflection and transmission coefficients, respectively). Since there is no absorption this system is reversible, as shown in the second picture (where the direction of the beams has been reversed). If this reversed process were actually taking place, there will be parts of the incoming fields (rE and tE) that are themselves transmitted and reflected at the boundary. In the third picture, this is shown by the coefficients r' and t' (for reflection and transmission of the reversed fields). Everything must interfere so that the second and third pictures agree; beam x has amplitude E and beam y has amplitude 0, providing Stokes relations.

The most interesting result here is that r=-r’. Thus, whatever phase is associated with reflection on one side of the interface, it is 180 degrees different on the other side of the interface. For example, if r has a phase of 0, r’ has a phase of 180 degrees.

Explicit values for the transmission and reflection coefficients are provided by the Fresnel equations

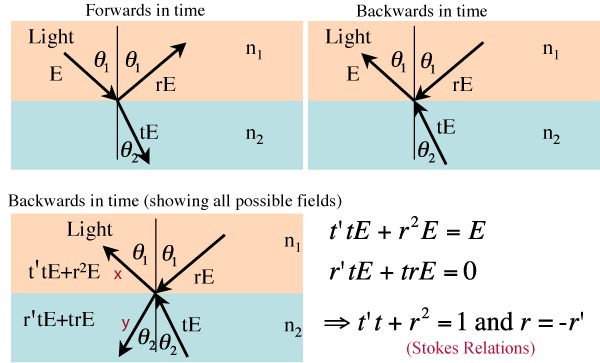
