= Cleostratus =

Astronomer of ancient Greece

Cleostratus (Greek: Κλεόστρατος; b. c. 520 BC; d. possibly 432 BC) was an astronomer of ancient Greece. He was a native of Tenedos. He is believed by ancient historians to have introduced the zodiac (beginning with Aries and Sagittarius) and the solar calendar. According to J. Webb, Cleostratus took his ideas from the Babylonians.

There is little primary material to credit any person with the creation or design of the Zodiac. Historical research on this has revealed translation issues and coincidences, including the Tenedos connection to the Philosopher Thales. Historical writings also refer to Cleostratus as a means of establishing a tradition of authority of Greek accomplishments. Continuation of Babylonian cycles is considered not to be scientific progress as the Greeks improved the accuracy of their cycles, only exercises in the art of combining days, months, and years, of which the relative mean durations had been learned from Babylon. The Greeks may have established a similar system, as other cultures had too, independently of the Babylonians. However, most agree that there can never be a definitive answer to who established the first known system in the West.

Pliny the Elder in his Natural History mentioned the zodiacal circle and commented: "Anaximander the Milesian, in the 58th Olympiad, is said to have been the first who understood its obliquity, and thus opened the road to a correct knowledge of the subject. Afterward, Cleostratus made the signs in it, first marking those of Aries and Sagittarius; Atlas had formed the sphere long before this time." Pliny also was writing in a way similar to his contemporaries in that a sound argument had to be based on past knowledge or the accomplishments of past thinkers.

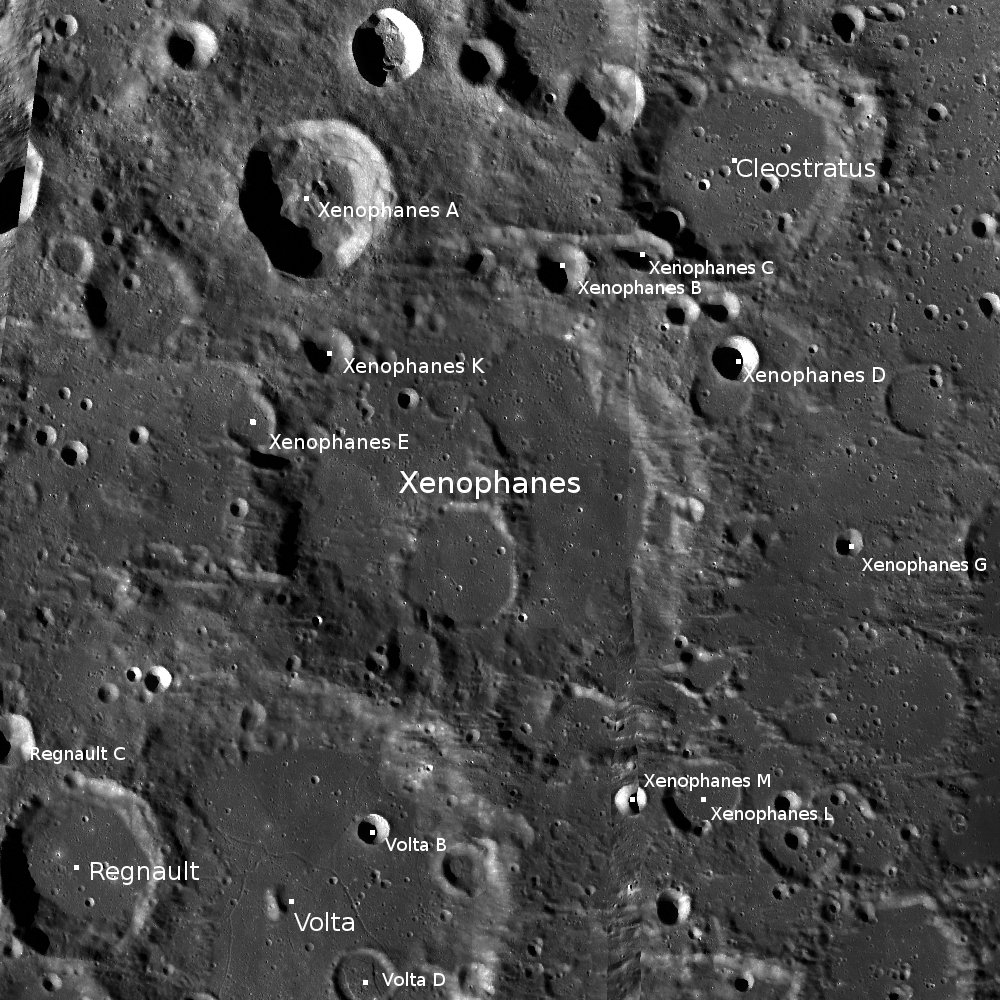
Xenophanes - LROC - WAC, Cleostratus in upper right

Censorinus (De Die Natali, c. 18) considers Cleostratus to have been the inventor of the octaeteris, or cycle of eight years. Cleostratus' name is associated with an eight-year intercalation cycle, to keep Greek civil calendars (lunar in nature) in line with the solar year, a cycle which was improved by Harpalus. The octaeteris was used before the Metonic cycle of 19 years, and was popularly attributed to Eudoxus. Theophrastus (de Sign. Pluv., p. 239, ed. Basil. 1541) mentions him as a meteorological observer along with Matricetas of Methymna and Phaeinus of Athens. Gaius Julius Hyginus (Poetica Astronomica, ii. 13) says that Cleostratus first pointed out the two stars in Auriga called Haedi.

The crater Cleostratus on the Moon is named after him.
