= Stokes (Martian crater) =

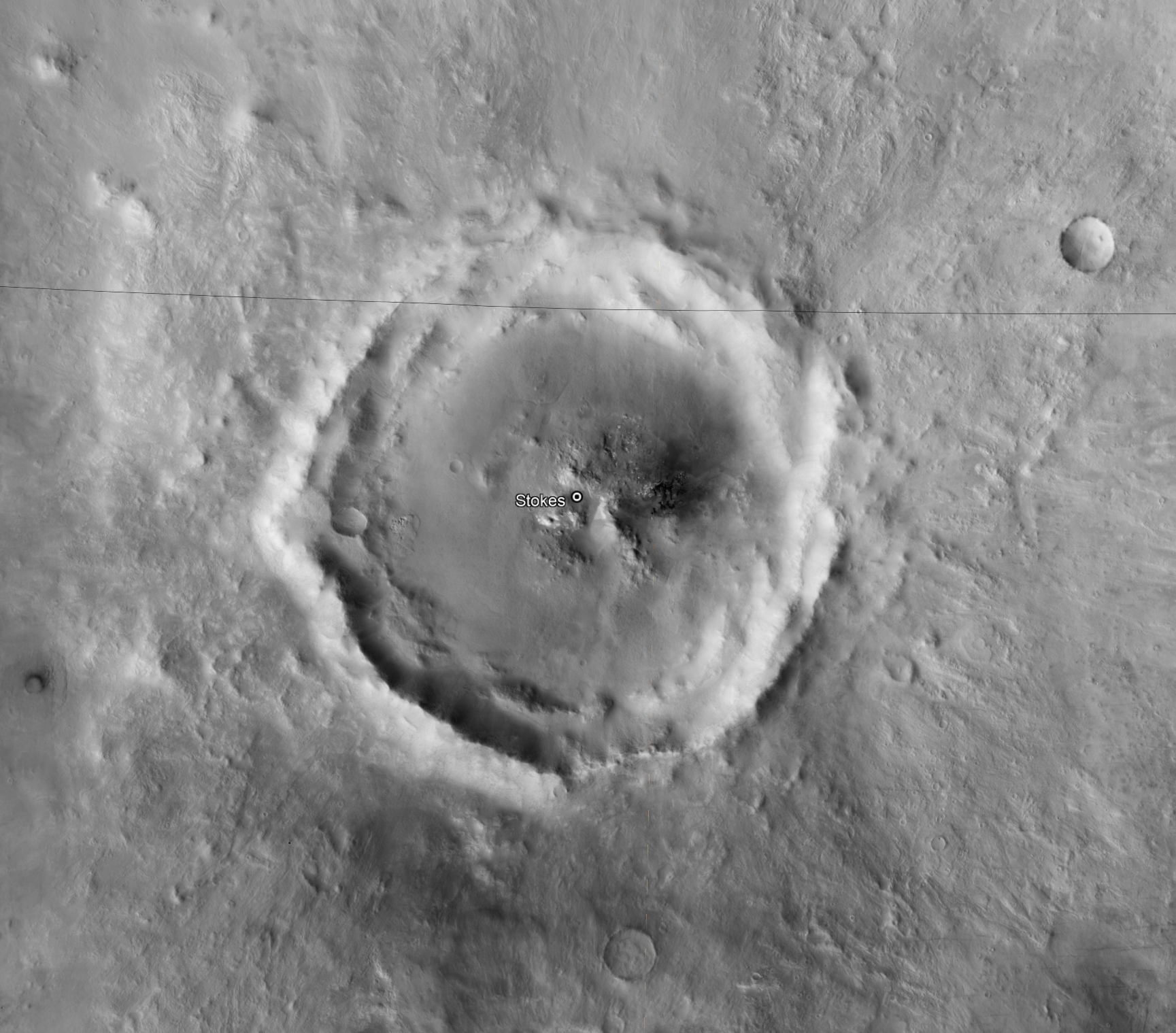
- Stokes crater
- Planet: Mars
- Coordinates: 55.9°N 188.8°W
- Quadrangle: Cebrenia
- Diameter: 62.74 km (38.98 mi)
- Eponym: Sir George Stokes, 1st Baronet

Stokes is an impact crater on Mars, located on the Martian Northern plains at 55.9°N latitude and 188.8°W longitude. It measures approximately 62.74 kilometres (38.98 mi) in diameter and was named after Irish physicist George Gabriel Stokes (1819–1903). The crater's name was officially adopted by IAU's Working Group for Planetary System Nomenclature in 1973.

It is distinctive for its dark-toned sand dunes, which have been formed by the planet's strong winds. Research released in July 2010 showed that is one of at least nine craters in the northern lowlands that contains hydrated minerals. They are clay minerals, also called phyllosilicates.
