= Skreen =

Village in County Sligo, Ireland

Skreen An Scrín
- Village
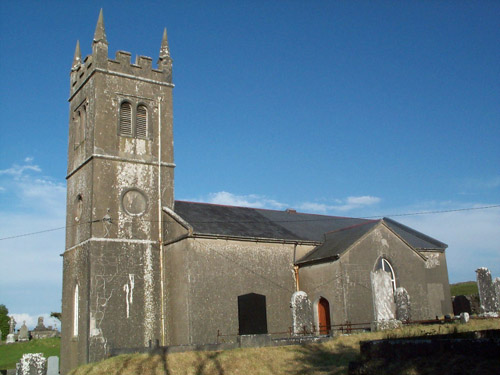
- Skreen Church of Ireland

- Location in Ireland
- Coordinates: 54°14′36″N 8°43′52″W
- Country: Ireland
- Province: Connacht
- County: County Sligo
- Elevation: 76 m (249 ft)
- Time zone: UTC+0 (WET)
  - Summer (DST): UTC-1 (IST (WEST))
- Irish Grid Reference: G523329

Skreen (Irish: An Scrín, meaning 'the shrine') is a small village and parish in County Sligo, Ireland. The village is in a civil parish of the same name.

== History ==
St Adomnán, the first biographer of St Columba (Colmcille) and one of his successors at Iona, first served as abbot at Skreen Abbey, which allegedly acquired its name from the relics of Adomnán. The abbey was possessed by Viking raiders in the ninth century, who pillaged and razed it. Besides his Columba biography, Adomnán is known for the Irish: Cáin Adomnáin the "Law of the Innocents", protecting women, children, and other non-combatants from being casualties of war.

The name Adamnan is, according to Cormac's Glossary, an Irish diminutive of Adam. It is generally pronounced in three syllables, but its proper Irish pronunciation is Awnaun, the "d" and the "m" being both aspirated. In the life of St Farannan, published by Colgan, we are informed that Tibraide, lord of Tir Fhiachrach, bestowed on St Columba a place called Irish: Cnoc-na-maoile; but that it was subsequently called Irish: Scrín-Adhamhnain from a shrine that saint erected there. From this shrine, the parish of Skreen in County Sligo derived its name. There, he is called Awnaun, and his well, Toberawnaun (which gives name to a townland), lies a little south of the old church.

The Abbey, of which there is no remaining trace, was located at the site of the present Skreen Church of Ireland church, next to which are an old graveyard and the extensive remains of the medieval church. Within the ruin is the gravesite of Reverend Gabriel Stokes, a 19th-century parson of the Church of Ireland parish and father of mathematician Sir George Stokes.

In the graveyard may be found many fine 18th-19th-century limestone box tombs, the most celebrated of which is the 1824 Alexander Black tomb, carved by "Old Frank" Diamond. His descendants are still, after seven generations, in the stonecutting business on the Coast Road.

Also in the parish are the considerable ruins of Ardnaglass Castle, originally a possession of the O'Dowds, then the MacSweeneys, and after the Cromwellian conquest the Joneses and the Blacks. It is just off the Coast Road on Protestant lane. It is now owned by Gerry Clarke.

There are two churches in Skreen, one Church of Ireland and the other Roman Catholic. The Spiritual Life Institute, a Catholic order consisting of "apostolic hermits", also has a retreat centre in Skreen.

== People ==
- Thady Connellan (Tadhg Ó Coinnialláin) Poet (1780-1854)
- Sir George Gabriel Stokes Mathematician and physicist (1819–1903).
- John Whitley Stokes, Archdeacon of Armagh, elder brother of the previous (1801-1883).
- William Tirry (1609-1654), martyred Roman Catholic priest.

== See also ==
- List of towns and villages in Ireland
