= Stokes (lunar crater) =

Crater on the Moon

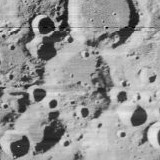
- Oblique Lunar Orbiter 4 image
- Coordinates: 52.5°N 88.1°W
- Diameter: 53.85 km (33.46 mi)
- Depth: Unknown
- Colongitude: 89° at sunrise
- Eponym: George G. Stokes

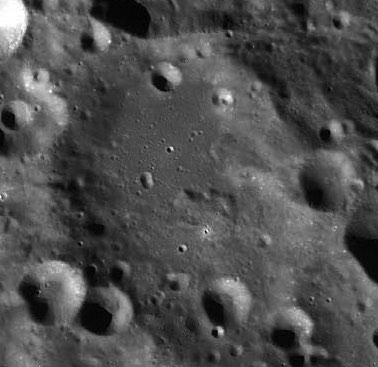
LRO image

Stokes is a lunar impact crater that is nestled in the curve formed by the craters Regnault to the north, Volta along the northeast, and Langley. This formation of craters lies nearly along the northwestern limb of the Moon, where their visibility is affected by libration effects.

The rim of this crater has been heavily modified by nearby impacts, although it retains a somewhat circular character. Several small craters lie along the western outer ramparts, as well as along the ridge between Stokes and Langley. Much of the southern section of the floor has been covered by ejecta from nearby impacts. The northern half of the floor, however, is much more smooth and nearly featureless except for a few minor impacts.

This crater is named after British mathematician and physicist George G. Stokes (1819–1903). Its designation was officially adopted by the International Astronomical Union in 1964.
