= Stokes approximation and artificial time =

This article provides an error analysis of time discretization applied to spatially discrete approximation of the stationary and nonstationary Navier-Stokes equations. The nonlinearity of the convection term is the main problem in solving a stationary or nonstationary Navier-Stokes equation or Euler equation problems. Stoke incorporated ‘the method of artificial compressibility’ to solve these problems.

== Navier-Stokes equation ==
$\rho \left(\frac{\partial \mathbf{v}}{\partial t} + \mathbf{v} \cdot \nabla \mathbf{v}\right) = -\nabla p + \mu \nabla^2 \mathbf{v} + \mathbf{f}.$

== Stokes approximation ==
The Stokes approximation is developed from the Navier-Stokes equations by omission of the convective term. For small Reynolds numbers in the incompressible flow, this approximation is more useful. Then incompressible Navier Stokes equation can be written as-

                 
  
    
      
        
          R
          
            e
          
        
        .
        
          ∂
          
            t
          
        
        
          
            
              u
              ~
            
          
        
        +
        
          R
          
            e
          
        
        .
        
          ⟨
          
            
              
                
                  u
                  ~
                
              
            
            ,
            
              
                
                  ∇
                  ~
                
              
            
          
          ⟩
        
        
          
            
              u
              ~
            
          
        
        +
        
          R
          
            e
          
        
        .
        ∇
        
          
            
              p
              ~
            
          
        
        −
        
          
            
              Δ
              ~
            
          
        
        
          
            
              u
              ~
            
          
        
        =
        0
      
    
    {\displaystyle R_{e}.\partial _{t}{\tilde {u}}+R_{e}.\left\langle {\tilde {u}},{\tilde {\nabla }}\right\rangle {\tilde {u}}+R_{e}.\nabla {\tilde {p}}-{\tilde {\Delta }}{\tilde {u}}=0}
  
.

Here linear diffusion term dominates the convection term. In the stationary problem neglecting the convection term, we get-

                   
  
    
      
        
          R
          
            e
          
        
        .
        ∇
        p
        −
        Δ
        u
        =
        0
      
    
    {\displaystyle R_{e}.\nabla p-\Delta u=0}
  

Many theorems can be proved by using this process. The main problem with the solution of the incompressible flow equation is the decoupling of the continuity and momentum equation due to the absence of pressure or density term. Chorin proposed the solution for this problem of the pressure decoupling; this approach is called artificial compressibility.

               
  
    
      
        
          ∂
          
            t
          
        
        ψ
        −
        L
        [
        ψ
        ]
        =
        0
        
           where 
        
        ψ
        =
        (
        
          u
          
            1
          
        
        ,
        
          u
          
            2
          
        
        ,
        
          u
          
            3
          
        
        ,
        p
        
          )
          
            T
          
        
      
    
    {\displaystyle \partial _{t}\psi -L[\psi ]=0{\text{ where }}\psi =(u_{1},u_{2},u_{3},p)^{T}}
  

In the above equation stoke assume that at, non-stationary Navier Stokes problem converge towards the solution of the correspondent stationary problem. This solution will not depend upon the function . If this is used for the above equation consisting of Navier stokes equation and continuity equations with time derivative of pressure, then the solution will be same as the stationary solution of the original Navier Stoke problem. This process also introduce the new term artificial time as t→∞. Artificial compressibility method is combined with a dual time stepping procedure which involves iteration in pseudo-time within each physical time step. This guarantees a convergence towards the solution for the incompressible flow problem.
