= Volta (crater) =

Crater on the Moon

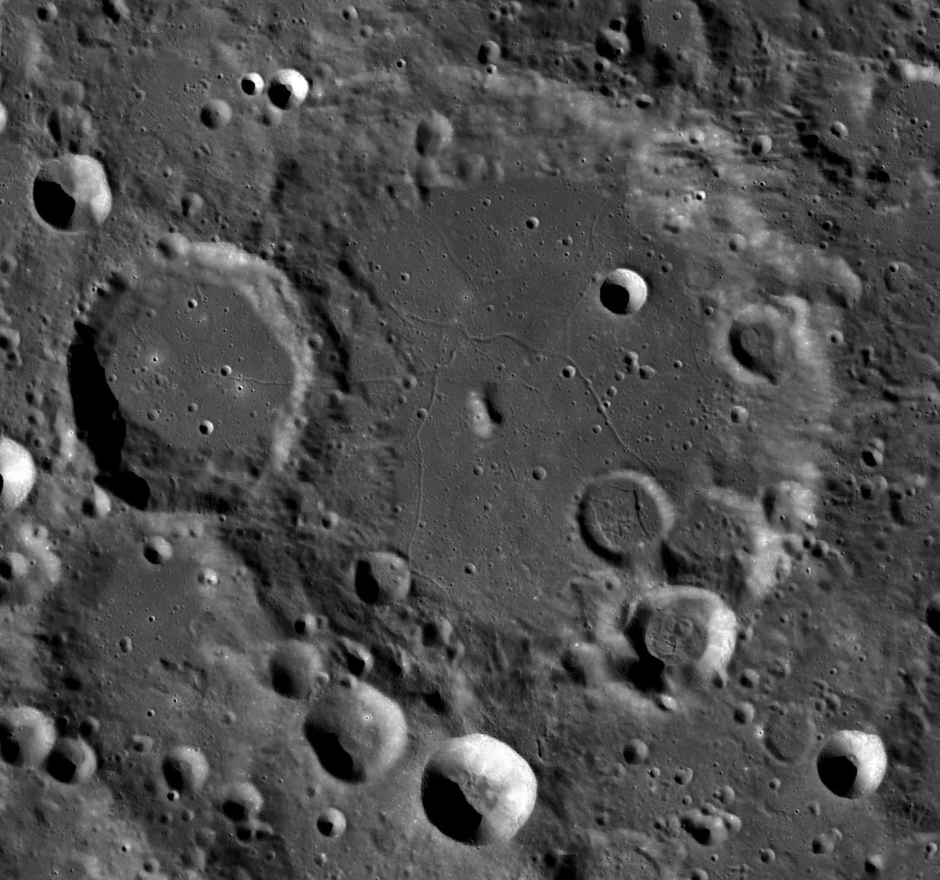
- LRO image
- Coordinates: 53.90°N 84.77°W
- Diameter: 117.15 km (72.79 mi)
- Depth: Unknown
- Colongitude: 88° at sunrise
- Eponym: Alessandro Volta

Volta is a lunar impact crater near the northwest limb of the Moon. It is located south-southeast of the crater Xenophanes, and due north of the smaller Galvani. The crater Regnault lies across the western rim of Volta. Attached to the southwest rim of Volta and the southern rim of Regnault is Stokes. The worn Langley is lying between Volta and Stokes in the north and Galvani in the south.

The outer rim of Volta is heavily worn and irregular, with small craters overlying the rim crest, a chain of craters along the east, and Regnault along the west rim. Even the northern rim is irregular, with a gouging valley extending through the north-northeast rim towards Xenophanes. In contrast the interior floor is relatively level and flat, other than some fractures. Volta B is in the northeast interior, and Volta D is on the southeast rim.

This crater is named after Italian physicist Alessandro Volta (1745–1827). Its designation was officially approved by the International Astronomical Union in 1964.

== Satellite craters ==
By convention these features are identified on lunar maps by placing the letter on the side of the crater midpoint that is closest to Volta.

Volta	Latitude	Longitude	Diameter
B	54.6° N	83.5° W	9 km
D	52.5° N	83.3° W	20 km
