= Sir George Stokes, 1st Baronet =

British mathematician and physicist (1819–1903)

Sir George Stokes Bt FRS
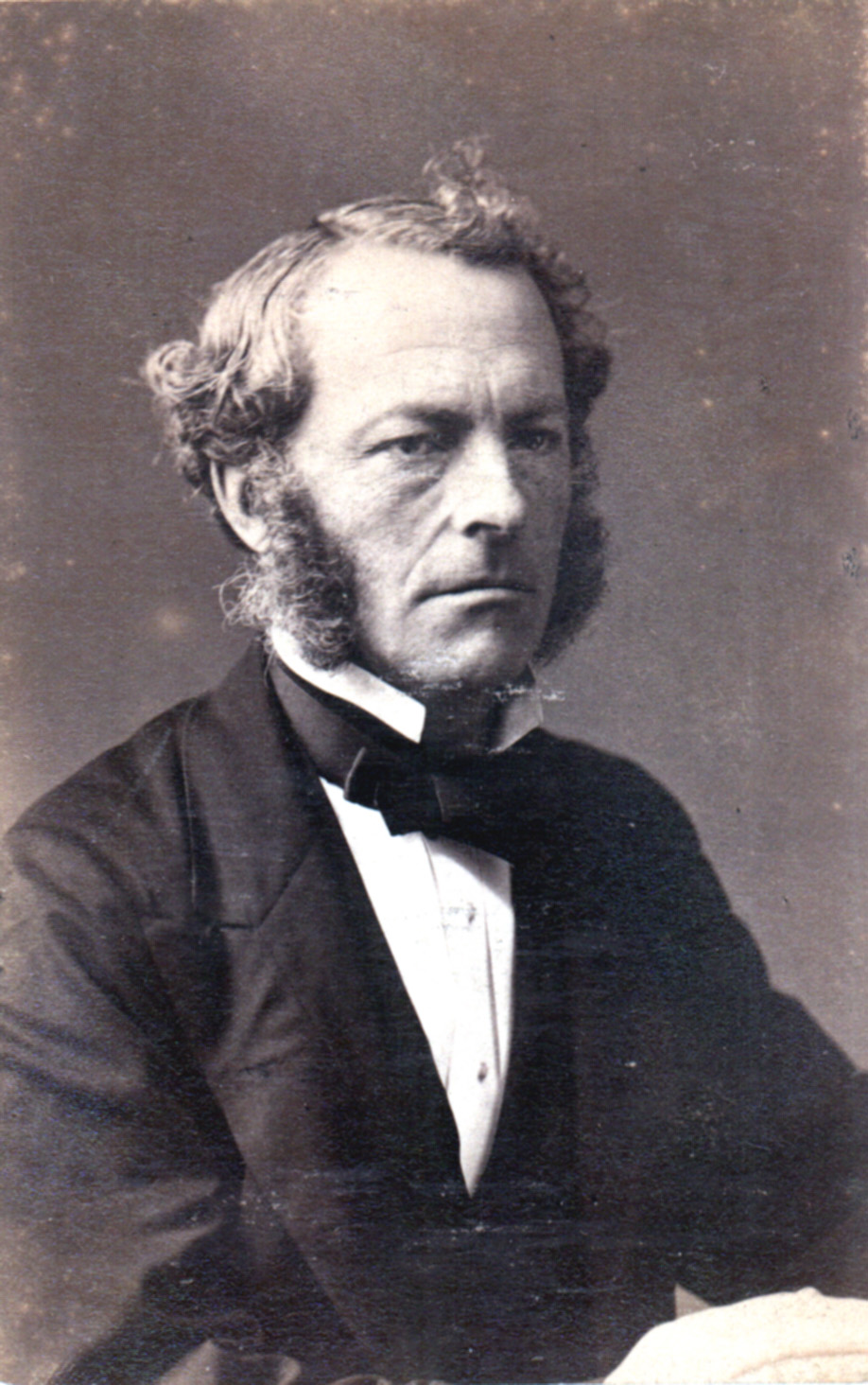
- Stokes, 1860s

35th President of the Royal Society
- In office 1885–1890
- Preceded by: Thomas Huxley
- Succeeded by: Lord Kelvin

Personal details
- Born: George Gabriel Stokes; 13 August 1819 Skreen, Ireland, United Kingdom of Great Britain and Ireland
- Died: 1 February 1903 (aged 83) Cambridge, England, United Kingdom of Great Britain and Ireland
- Resting place: Mill Road Cemetery, Cambridge
- Education: Pembroke College, Cambridge
- Known for: Stokes flow; Stokes' law; Stokes number; Stokes' paradox; Stokes parameters; Stokes relations; Stokes shift; Stokes' theorem; Stokes waves; Navier–Stokes equations
- Spouse: Mary Robinson (m. 1857)
- Children: 5
- Relatives: John Stokes (brother); Thomas Romney Robinson (father-in-law)
- Awards: Rumford Medal (1852); The William Hopkins Prize (1870); Copley Medal (1893)
- Scientific career
- Fields: Fluid dynamics; optics
- Workplaces: University of Cambridge (1841–1903)
- Academic advisors: William Hopkins
- Notable students: Thomas George Bonney; Robert Alfred Herman; Thomas John I'Anson Bromwich; Horace Lamb; Osborne Reynolds; John William Strutt

Sir George Gabriel Stokes, 1st Baronet (/stoʊks/ STOHKS; 13 August 1819 – 1 February 1903), was an Irish mathematician and physicist, born in County Sligo, Ireland, in the United Kingdom of Great Britain and Ireland. Stokes spent his entire career at the University of Cambridge, where he served as Lucasian Professor of Mathematics for 54 years—from 1849 until his death in 1903—the longest tenure held by any Lucasian Professor.

As a physicist, Stokes made seminal contributions to fluid mechanics, including the Navier–Stokes equations; and to optics, with notable works on polarisation and fluorescence. As a mathematician, he popularised Stokes' theorem in vector calculus and contributed to the theory of asymptotic expansions. Stokes, along with Felix Hoppe-Seyler, first demonstrated the oxygen transport function of haemoglobin, and showed colour changes produced by the aeration of haemoglobin solutions.

Stokes represented Cambridge University in the House of Commons from 1887 to 1892, sitting as a Conservative. He also served as President of the Royal Society from 1885 to 1890, and was briefly Master of Pembroke College, Cambridge. Stokes's extensive correspondence and his work as secretary of the Royal Society has led him to be referred to as a gatekeeper of Victorian science, with his contributions surpassing his own published papers.

== Biography ==
George Gabriel Stokes was born on 13 August 1819 in Skreen, Ireland, the youngest son of the Reverend Gabriel Stokes, a clergyman in the Church of Ireland who served as Rector of Skreen, and Elizabeth Haughton, daughter of the Reverend John Haughton. His home life was strongly influenced by his father's evangelical Protestantism; three of his brothers entered the Church, of whom the most eminent was John Stokes, who became Archdeacon of Armagh. Alongside a lifelong commitment to his Protestant faith, his childhood in Skreen had a strong influence on his later decision to pursue fluid dynamics as a research area. His daughter, Isabella Humphreys, wrote that her father "told me that he was nearly carried away by one of these great waves when bathing as a boy off the coast of Sligo, and this first attracted his attention to waves."

John and George were always close, and George lived with John while attending school in Dublin. Of all his family, he was closest to his sister, Elizabeth. Their mother was remembered in the family as "beautiful but very stern." In 1837, after attending schools in Skreen, Dublin, and Bristol, Stokes matriculated at Pembroke College, Cambridge. In 1841, he graduated as Senior Wrangler and Smith's Prizeman, achievements that earned him election as a fellow of the college that year.

In accordance with the college statutes, Stokes had to resign from his fellowship when he married in 1857. Twelve years later, under new statutes, he was re-elected to the fellowship and retained that place until 1902, when he was elected Master of Pembroke College. He died the following year on 1 February at the age of 83, and was buried at Mill Road Cemetery in Cambridge. There is also a memorial to him in the north aisle at Westminster Abbey.

== Career ==
In 1849, Stokes was appointed Lucasian Professor of Mathematics at the University of Cambridge, a position he held until his death in 1903. On 1 June 1899, the golden jubilee of this appointment was celebrated there in a ceremony attended by numerous delegates from European and American universities. A commemorative gold medal was presented to Stokes by the chancellor of the university, and marble busts of Stokes by Hamo Thornycroft were formally offered to Pembroke College and to the university by Lord Kelvin. At 54 years, Stokes's tenure as Lucasian Professor was the longest in history.

Stokes, who was made a baronet in 1889, further served his university by representing it in parliament from 1887 to 1892 as one of the two members for the Cambridge University constituency. From 1885 to 1890, he was also president of the Royal Society, of which he had been one of the secretaries since 1854. As he was also Lucasian Professor at this time, he was the first person to hold all three positions simultaneously; Isaac Newton held the same three, although not at the same time.

Stokes was the oldest of the trio of natural philosophers, James Clerk Maxwell and Lord Kelvin being the other two, who especially contributed to the fame of the Cambridge school of mathematical physics in the middle of the 19th century.

Stokes's original work began about 1840, and is distinguished for its quantity and quality. The Royal Society's catalogue of scientific papers gives the titles of over a hundred memoirs by him published down to 1883. Some of these are only brief notes, others are short controversial or corrective statements, but many are long and elaborate treatises.

== Research ==
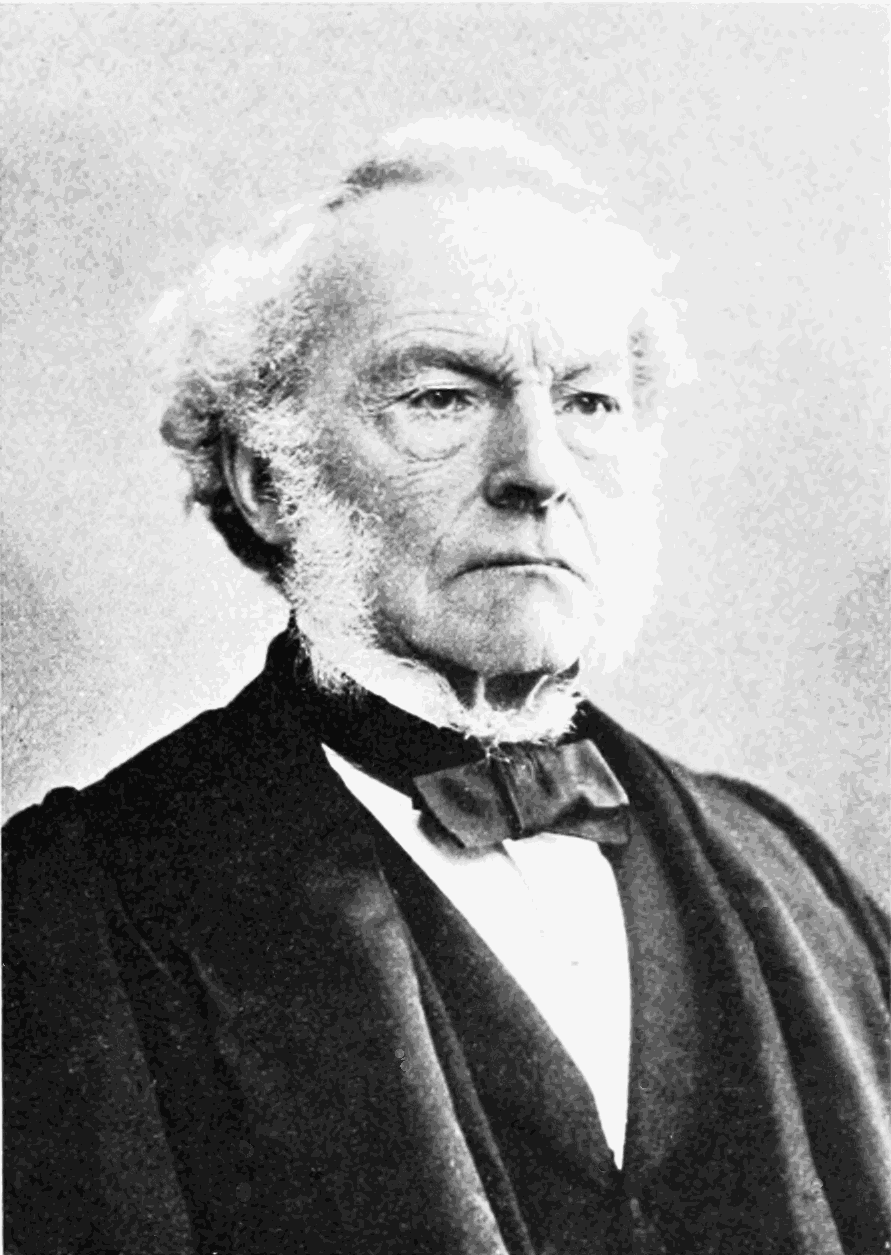
Stokes at a later age

In scope, Stokes's work covered a wide range of physical inquiry but, as Marie Alfred Cornu remarked in his Rede Lecture of 1899, the greater part of it was concerned with waves and the transformations imposed on them during their passage through various media.

=== Fluid dynamics ===
Stokes's first published papers, which appeared in 1842 and 1843, were on the steady motion of incompressible fluids and some cases of fluid motion. These were followed in 1845 by one on the friction of fluids in motion and the equilibrium and motion of elastic solids, and in 1850 by another on the effects of the internal friction of fluids on the motion of pendulums. To the theory of sound he made several contributions, including a discussion of the effect of wind on the intensity of sound and an explanation of how the intensity is influenced by the nature of the gas in which the sound is produced. These inquiries together put the science of fluid dynamics on a new footing, and provided a key not only to the explanation of many natural phenomena, such as the suspension of clouds in the air, and the subsidence of ripples and waves in water, but also to the solution of practical problems, such as the flow of water in rivers and channels, and the skin resistance of ships.

==== Creeping flow ====
Creeping flow past a sphere: streamlines and forces

Stokes's work on fluid motion and viscosity led to his calculating the terminal velocity for a sphere falling in a viscous medium. This became known as Stokes' law. He derived an expression for the frictional force (also called drag force) exerted on spherical objects with very small Reynolds numbers.

Stokes's work is the basis of the falling sphere viscometer, in which the fluid is stationary in a vertical glass tube. A sphere of known size and density is allowed to descend through the liquid. If correctly selected, it reaches terminal velocity, which can be measured by the time it takes to pass two marks on the tube. Electronic sensing can be used for opaque fluids. Knowing the terminal velocity, the size and density of the sphere, and the density of the liquid, Stokes's law can be used to calculate the viscosity of the fluid. A series of steel ball bearings of different diameters is normally used in the classic experiment to improve the accuracy of the calculation. The school experiment uses glycerine as the fluid, and the technique is used industrially to check the viscosity of fluids used in processes.

The same theory explains why small water droplets (or ice crystals) can remain suspended in air (as clouds) until they grow to a critical size and start falling as rain (or snow and hail). Similar use of the equation can be made in the settlement of fine particles in water or other fluids.

The stokes, the CGS unit of kinematic viscosity, was named in recognition of his work.

=== Optics ===
Perhaps Stokes's best-known researches are those which deal with the wave theory of light. His optical work began at an early period in his scientific career. His first papers on the aberration of light appeared in 1845 and 1846, and were followed in 1848 by one on the theory of certain bands seen in the spectrum.

In 1849, Stokes published a long paper on the dynamical theory of diffraction, in which he showed that the plane of polarisation must be perpendicular to the direction of propagation. Two years later, he discussed the colours of thick plates.

Stokes also investigated George Airy's mathematical description of rainbows. Airy's findings involved an integral that was awkward to evaluate. Stokes expressed the integral as a divergent series, which were little understood. However, by cleverly truncating the series (i.e., ignoring all except the first few terms of the series), he obtained an accurate approximation to the integral that was far easier to evaluate than the integral itself. Stokes's research on asymptotic series led to fundamental insights about such series.

==== Fluorescence ====
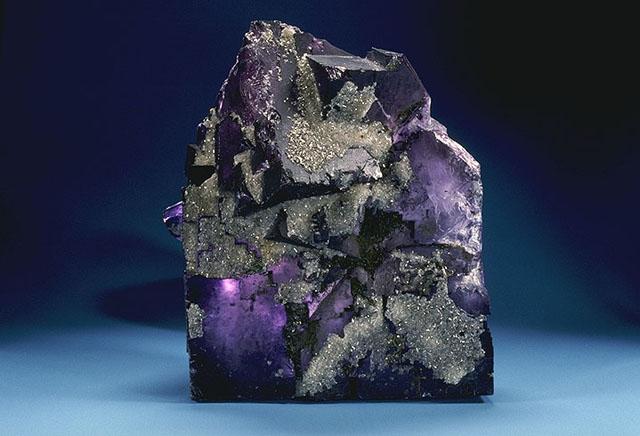
Fluorspar

In 1852, in his famous paper on the change of wavelength of light, he described the phenomenon of fluorescence, as exhibited by fluorspar and uranium glass, materials which he viewed as having the power to convert invisible ultra-violet radiation into radiation of longer wavelengths that are visible. The Stokes shift, which describes this conversion, is named in Stokes's honour. A mechanical model, illustrating the dynamical principle of Stokes's explanation was shown. The offshoot of this, Stokes line, is the basis of Raman scattering. In 1883, during a lecture at the Royal Institution, Lord Kelvin said he had heard an account of it from Stokes many years before, and had repeatedly but vainly begged him to publish it.

==== Polarisation ====
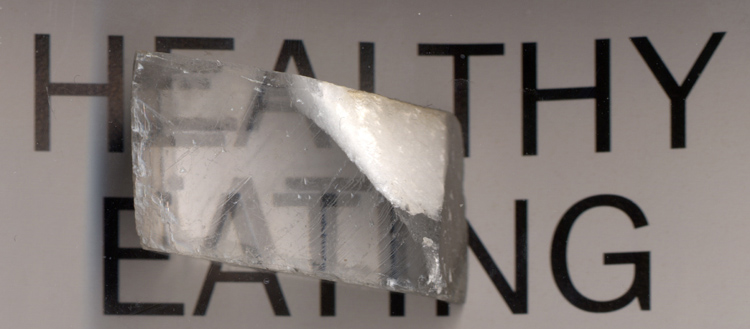
A calcite crystal laid upon a paper with some letters showing the double refraction

In the same year, 1852, there appeared the paper on the composition and resolution of streams of polarised light from different sources, and in 1853 an investigation of the metallic reflection exhibited by certain non-metallic substances. The research was to highlight the phenomenon of light polarisation. About 1860 he was engaged in an inquiry on the intensity of light reflected from, or transmitted through, a pile of plates; and in 1862 he prepared for the British Association a valuable report on double refraction, a phenomenon where certain crystals show different refractive indices along different axes. Perhaps the best known crystal is Iceland spar, transparent calcite crystals.

A paper on the long spectrum of the electric light bears the same date, and was followed by an inquiry into the absorption spectrum of blood.

=== Chemical analysis ===
The chemical identification of organic bodies by their optical properties was treated in 1864; and later, in conjunction with the Rev. William Vernon Harcourt, he investigated the relation between the chemical composition and the optical properties of various glasses, with reference to the conditions of transparency and the improvement of achromatic telescopes. A still later paper connected with the construction of optical instruments discussed the theoretical limits to the aperture of microscope objectives.

=== Ophthalmology ===
In 1849, Stokes invented the Stokes lens to detect astigmatism. It is a lens combination consisting of equal but opposite power cylindrical lenses attached together in such a way so that the lenses can be rotated relative to one another.

=== Mathematics ===
The result now known as Stokes' theorem, relating the line integral of a vector field around a closed curve to the surface integral of its curl over a bounded surface, was communicated to Stokes by William Thomson in a letter of 2 July 1850. Stokes set it as question 8 of the Smith's Prize examination of February 1854, for which James Clerk Maxwell was among the candidates, and the theorem has borne his name since. Its modern form, for differential forms on manifolds, is the generalized Stokes theorem.

Stokes made lasting contributions to the theory of asymptotic expansions. In a paper presented in 1850 he evaluated the integral arising in Airy's theory of the rainbow by means of a divergent series, truncated to yield a highly accurate approximation. In a further paper presented in 1857 he showed that the constants multiplying exponentially small terms in such expansions change discontinuously as the argument crosses certain rays in the complex plane. This behaviour, now called the Stokes phenomenon, and the rays themselves, called Stokes lines, are fundamental to the modern theory of asymptotics.

In analysis, Stokes's 1847 paper on the critical values of the sums of periodic series examined the convergence of Fourier series near points of discontinuity. In doing so he introduced, independently of Seidel, a notion of "infinitely slow" convergence that anticipated the concept of uniform convergence later formalised by Weierstrass.

=== Other work ===
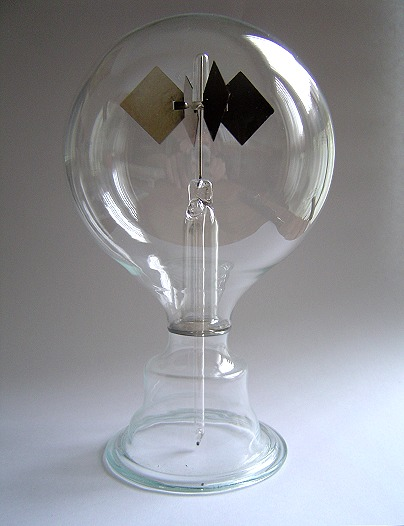
Crookes Radiometer

In other areas of physics may be mentioned his paper on the conduction of heat in crystals (1851) and his inquiries in connection with Crookes radiometer; his explanation of the light border frequently noticed in photographs just outside the outline of a dark body seen against the sky (1882); and, still later, his theory of the x-rays, which he suggested might be transverse waves travelling as innumerable solitary waves, not in regular trains. He gave a lecture entitled "On the nature of Röntgen rays", to the Cambridge Philosophical Society, Manchester Literary & Philosophical Society and submitted it for publication to Nature.

Two long papers published in 1849—one on attractions and Clairaut's theorem, and the other on the variation of Earth's gravity at the surface of the planet (1849) Stokes's gravity formula—also merit notice. He also authored mathematical memoirs on the critical values of sums of periodic series (1847) and on the numerical calculation of a class of definite integrals and infinite series (1850). His discussion of a differential equation relating to the breaking of railway bridges (1849) was related to his evidence given to the Royal Commission on the Use of Iron in Railway structures after the Dee Bridge disaster of 1847.

=== Unpublished research ===
Many of Stokes's discoveries were not published, or were only touched upon in the course of his oral lectures. One such example is his work in the theory of spectroscopy.

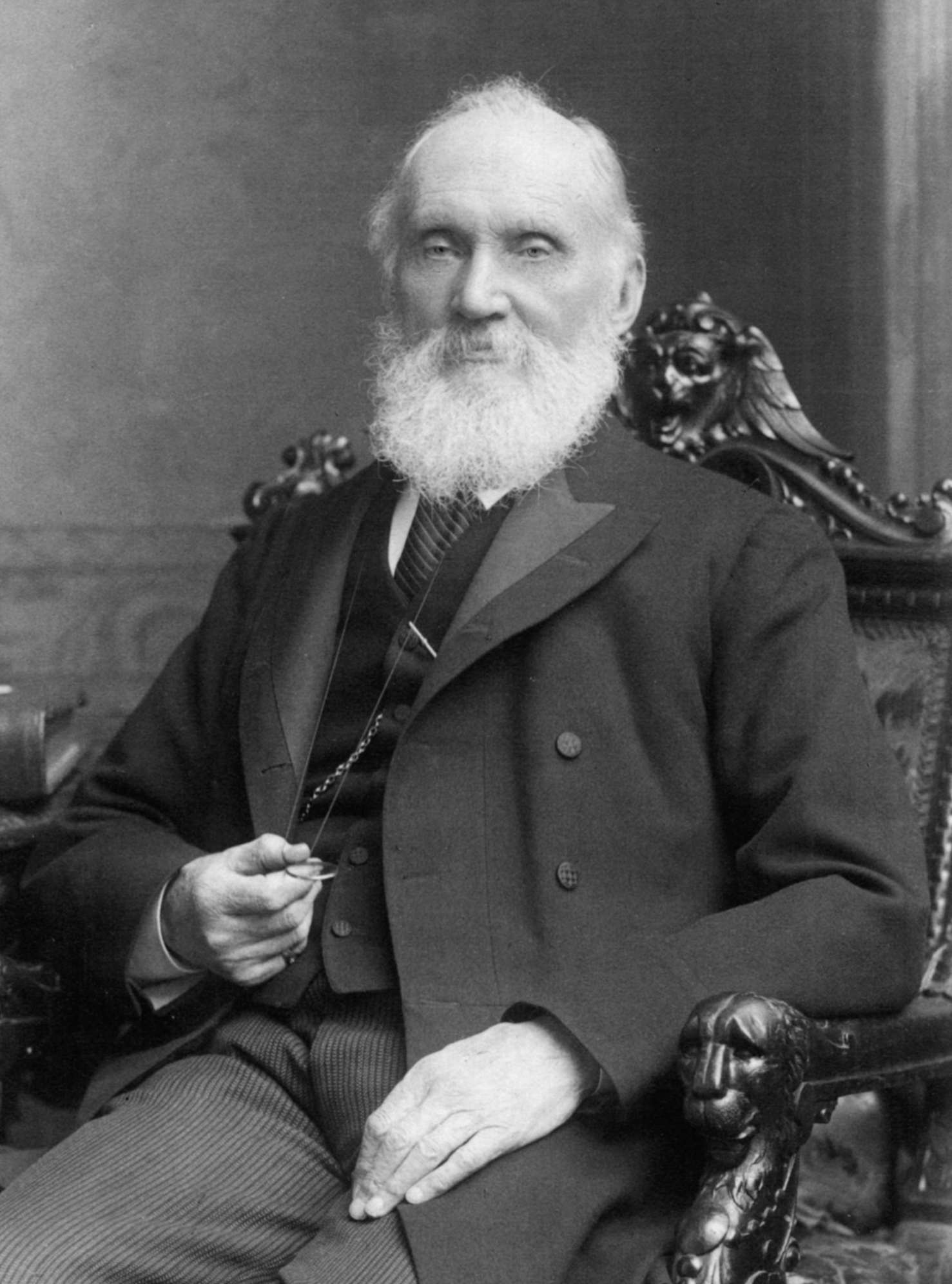
Lord Kelvin

In his presidential address to the British Association in 1871, Lord Kelvin stated his belief that the application of the prismatic analysis of light to solar and stellar chemistry had never been suggested directly or indirectly by anyone else when Stokes taught it to him at Cambridge University some time prior to the summer of 1852, and he set forth the conclusions, theoretical and practical, which he learnt from Stokes at that time, and which he afterwards gave regularly in his public lectures at Glasgow.

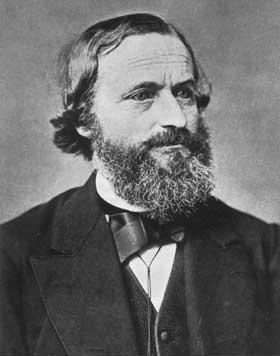
Kirchhoff

These statements, containing as they do the physical basis on which spectroscopy rests, and the way in which it is applicable to the identification of substances existing in the sun and stars, make it appear that Stokes anticipated Gustav Kirchhoff by at least seven or eight years. Stokes, however, in a letter published some years after the delivery of this address, stated that he had failed to take one essential step in the argument—not perceiving that emission of light of definite wavelength not merely permitted, but necessitated, absorption of light of the same wavelength. He modestly disclaimed "any part of Kirchhoff's admirable discovery," adding that he felt some of his friends had been over-zealous in his cause. It must be said, however, that English scientists have not accepted this disclaimer in all its fullness, and still attribute to Stokes the credit of having first enunciated the fundamental principles of spectroscopy.

In another way, too, Stokes did much for the progress of mathematical physics. Soon after he was elected to the Lucasian chair he announced that he regarded it as part of his professional duties to help any member of the university with difficulties he might encounter in his mathematical studies, and the assistance rendered was so real that pupils were glad to consult him, even after they had become colleagues, on mathematical and physical problems in which they found themselves at a loss. Then during the thirty years he acted as secretary of the Royal Society, he exercised an enormous if inconspicuous influence on the advancement of mathematical and physical science, not only directly by his own investigations, but indirectly by suggesting problems for inquiry and inciting men to attack them, and by his readiness to give encouragement and help.

=== Contributions to engineering ===
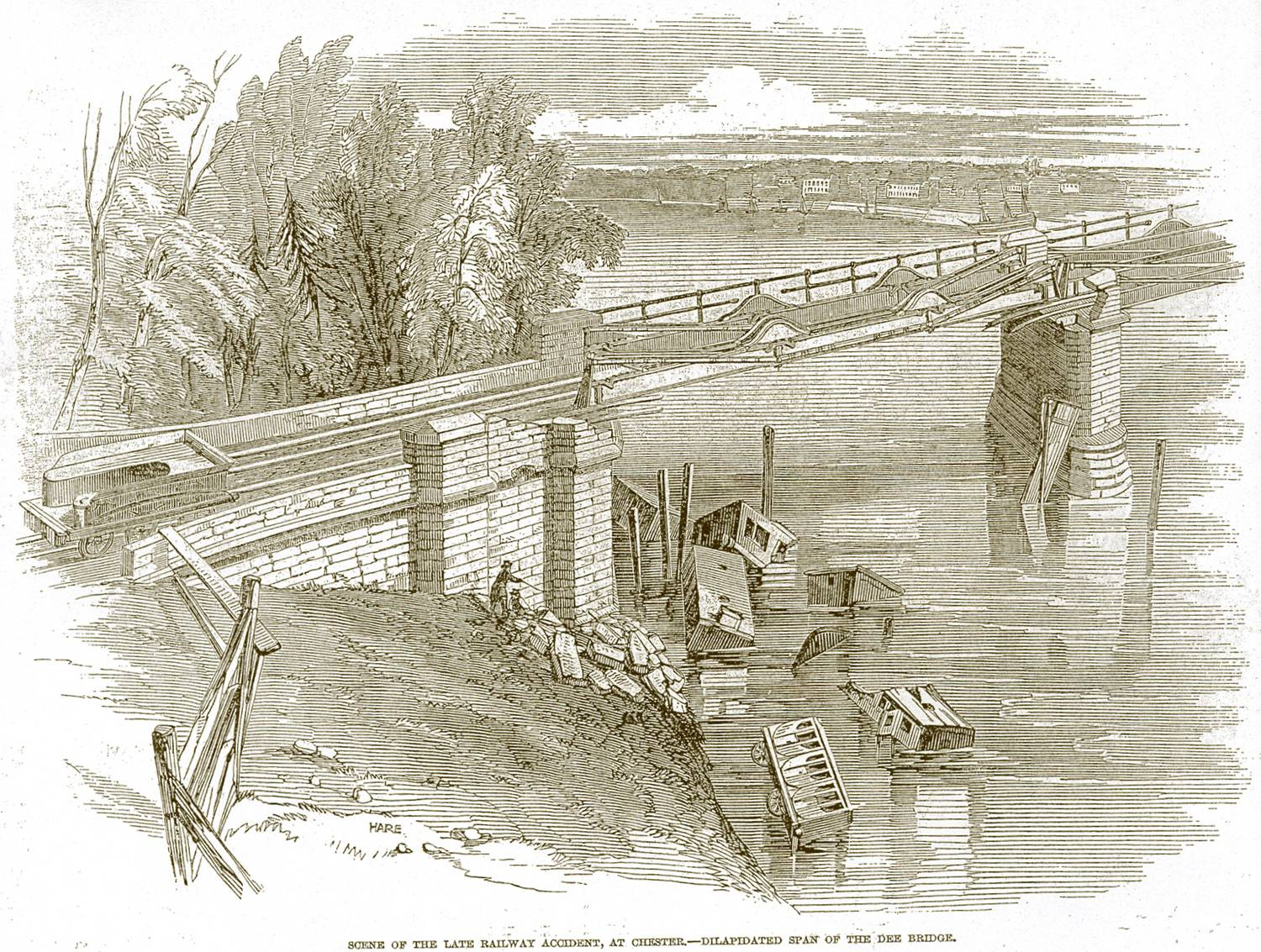
The Dee Bridge after its collapse

Stokes was involved in several investigations into railway accidents, especially the Dee Bridge disaster in Chester in May 1847, and he served as a member of the subsequent Royal Commission into the use of cast iron in railway structures. He contributed to the calculation of the forces exerted by moving engines on bridges. The bridge failed because a cast iron beam was used to support the loads of passing trains. Cast iron is brittle in tension or bending, and many other similar bridges had to be demolished or reinforced.

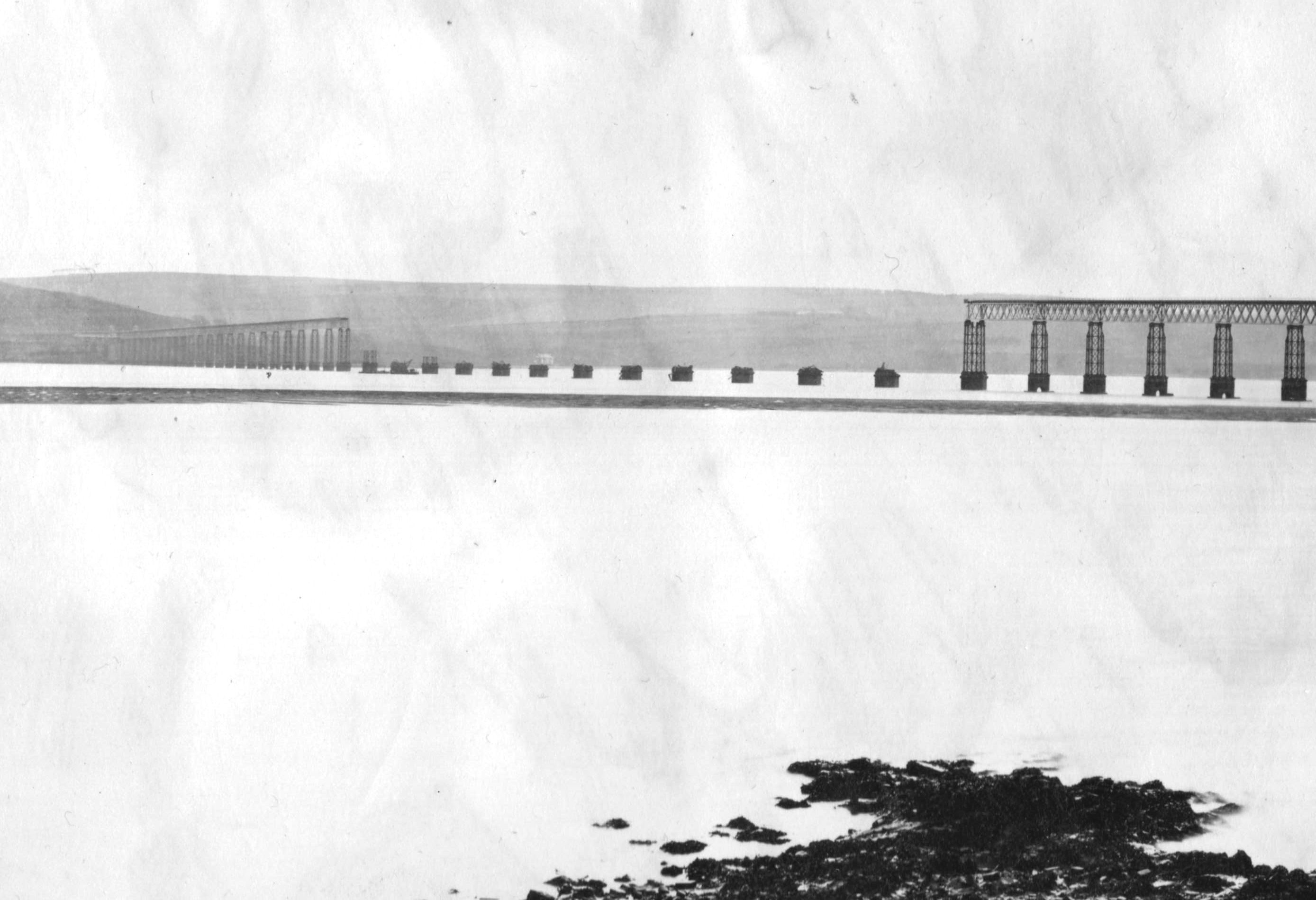
Fallen Tay Bridge from the north

He appeared as an expert witness at the Tay Bridge disaster, where he gave evidence about the effects of wind loads on the bridge. The centre section of the bridge (known as the High Girders) was completely destroyed during a storm on 28 December 1879, while an express train was in the section, and everyone aboard died (more than 75 victims). The Board of Inquiry listened to many expert witnesses, and concluded that the bridge was "badly designed, badly built and badly maintained".

As a result of his evidence, he was appointed a member of the subsequent Royal Commission into the effect of wind pressure on structures. The effects of high winds on large structures had been neglected at that time, and the commission conducted a series of measurements across Britain to gain an appreciation of wind speeds during storms, and the pressures they exerted on exposed surfaces.

=== Work on religion ===
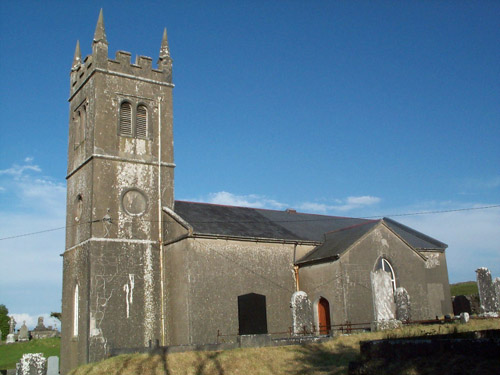
Skreen, Church of Ireland in County Sligo

Stokes generally held conservative religious values and beliefs. In 1886, he became president of the Victoria Institute, which had been founded to defend evangelical Christian principles against challenges from the new sciences, especially the Darwinian theory of biological evolution. He gave the 1891 Gifford lecture on natural theology. He was also the vice-president of the British and Foreign Bible Society and was actively involved in doctrinal debates concerning missionary work. However, although his religious views were mostly orthodox, he was unusual among Victorian evangelicals in rejecting eternal punishment in hell, and instead was a proponent of Christian conditionalism.

As President of the Victoria Institute, Stokes wrote:

We all admit that the book of Nature and the book of Revelation come alike from God, and that consequently there can be no real discrepancy between the two if rightly interpreted. The provisions of Science and Revelation are, for the most part, so distinct that there is little chance of collision. But if an apparent discrepancy should arise, we have no right on principle, to exclude either in favour of the other. For however firmly convinced we may be of the truth of revelation, we must admit our liability to err as to the extent or interpretation of what is revealed; and however strong the scientific evidence in favour of a theory may be, we must remember that we are dealing with evidence which, in its nature, is probable only, and it is conceivable that wider scientific knowledge might lead us to alter our opinion.

== Family ==
On 4 July 1857, Stokes married Mary Susanna Robinson, the only daughter of Irish astronomer Thomas Romney Robinson, at St Patrick's Cathedral in Armagh. They had five children: Arthur Romney, who inherited the Stokes Baronetcy; Susanna Elizabeth, who died in infancy; Isabella Lucy (Mrs Laurence Humphry), who contributed the personal memoir of her father in "Memoir and Scientific Correspondence of the Late George Gabriel Stokes, Bart"; Dr William George Gabriel, physician, a troubled man who committed suicide aged 30 while temporarily insane; and Dora Susanna, who died in infancy. His male line and hence his baronetcy have since become extinct.

== Recognition ==
=== Memberships ===
Country	Year	Institute	Type	Ref.
United Kingdom	1851	Royal Society	Fellow	
United States	1874	American Academy of Arts and Sciences	International Honorary Member	
United States	1883	National Academy of Sciences	International Member	
United States	1889	American Philosophical Society	International Member	

=== Awards ===
Country	Year	Institute	Award	Citation	Ref.
United Kingdom	1852	Royal Society	Rumford Medal	"For his discovery of the change in the refrangibility of light"	
United Kingdom	1893	Royal Society	Copley Medal	"For his researches and discoveries in physical science"	

=== Chivalry ===
Country	Year	Monarch	Title/Order	Ref.
Germany	1879	Wilhelm I	Pour le Mérite	
United Kingdom	1889	Victoria	Baronet	

=== Honorary degrees ===
Country	Year	Institute	Degree	Ref.
Norway	1902	Royal Frederick University	Doctor mathematicae	

== Commemorations ==
- The stokes, a unit of kinematic viscosity, is named after him.
- 1909: the Stokes Society at Pembroke College, Cambridge, was founded as an academic hub for undergraduate scientists across the university. It remains active as of 2023.
- 1964: the lunar crater Stokes was named in his honor.
- 1973: the Martian crater Stokes was named in his honor.
- July 2017: Dublin City University named a building after Stokes in recognition of his contributions to physics and mathematics

== Publications ==
Stokes's mathematical and physical papers (see external links) were published in a collected form in five volumes; the first three (Cambridge, 1880, 1883, and 1901) under his own editorship, and the two last (Cambridge, 1904 and 1905) under that of Sir Joseph Larmor, who also selected and arranged the Memoir and Scientific Correspondence of Stokes published at Cambridge in 1907.

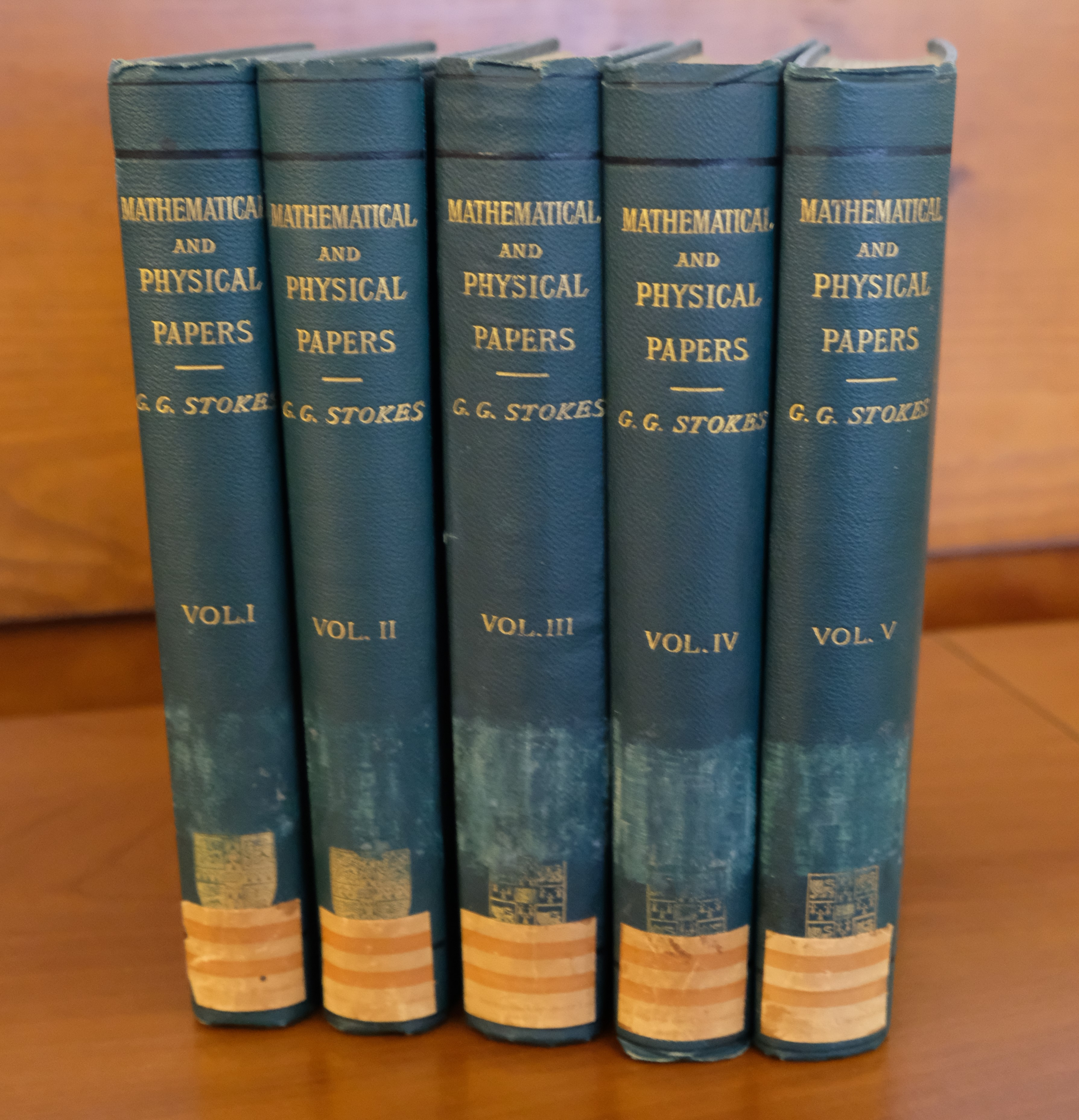
Volumes I–V of Mathematical and Physical Papers (1880–1905)

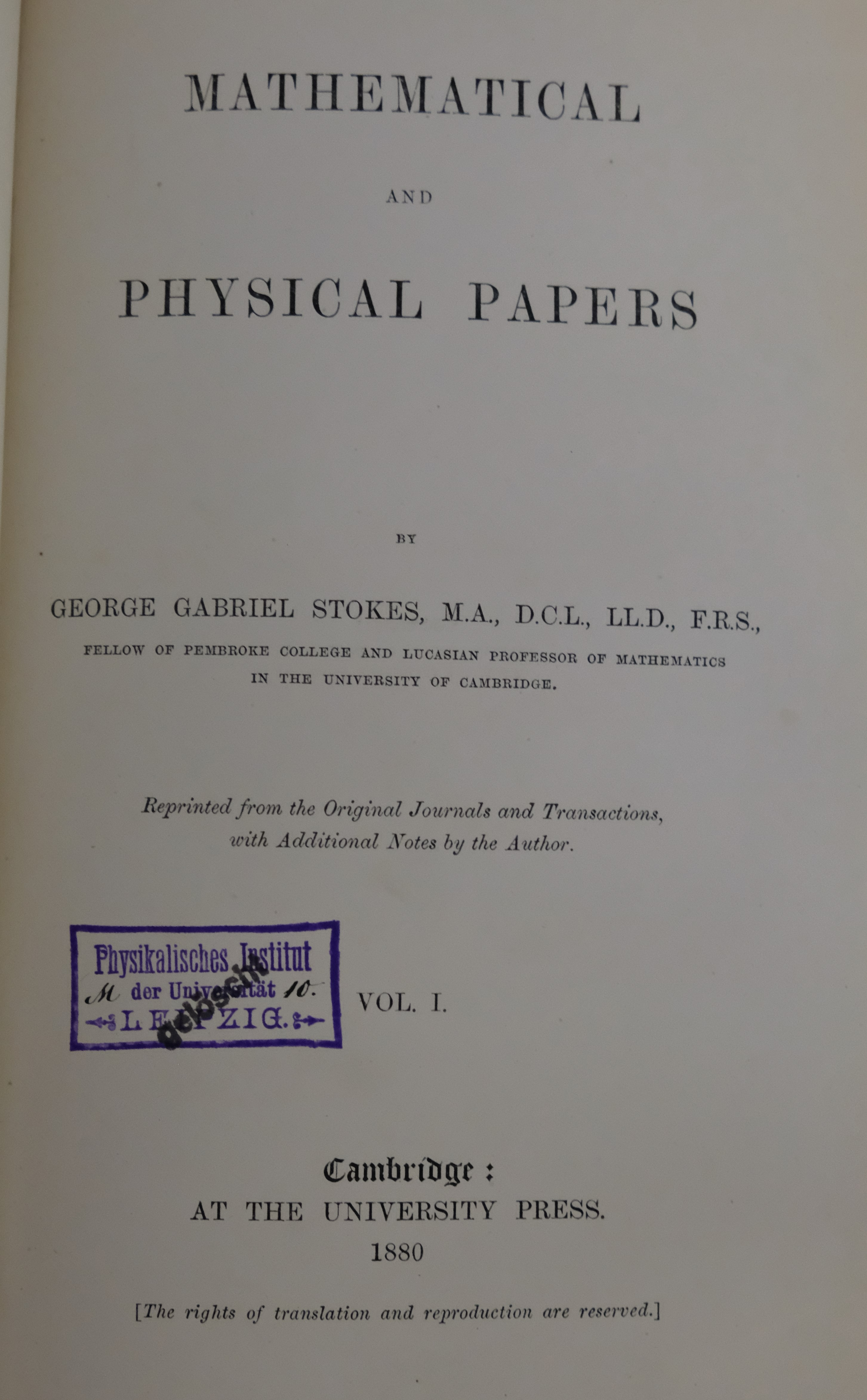
Title page to Volume I of Mathematical and Physical Papers (1880)

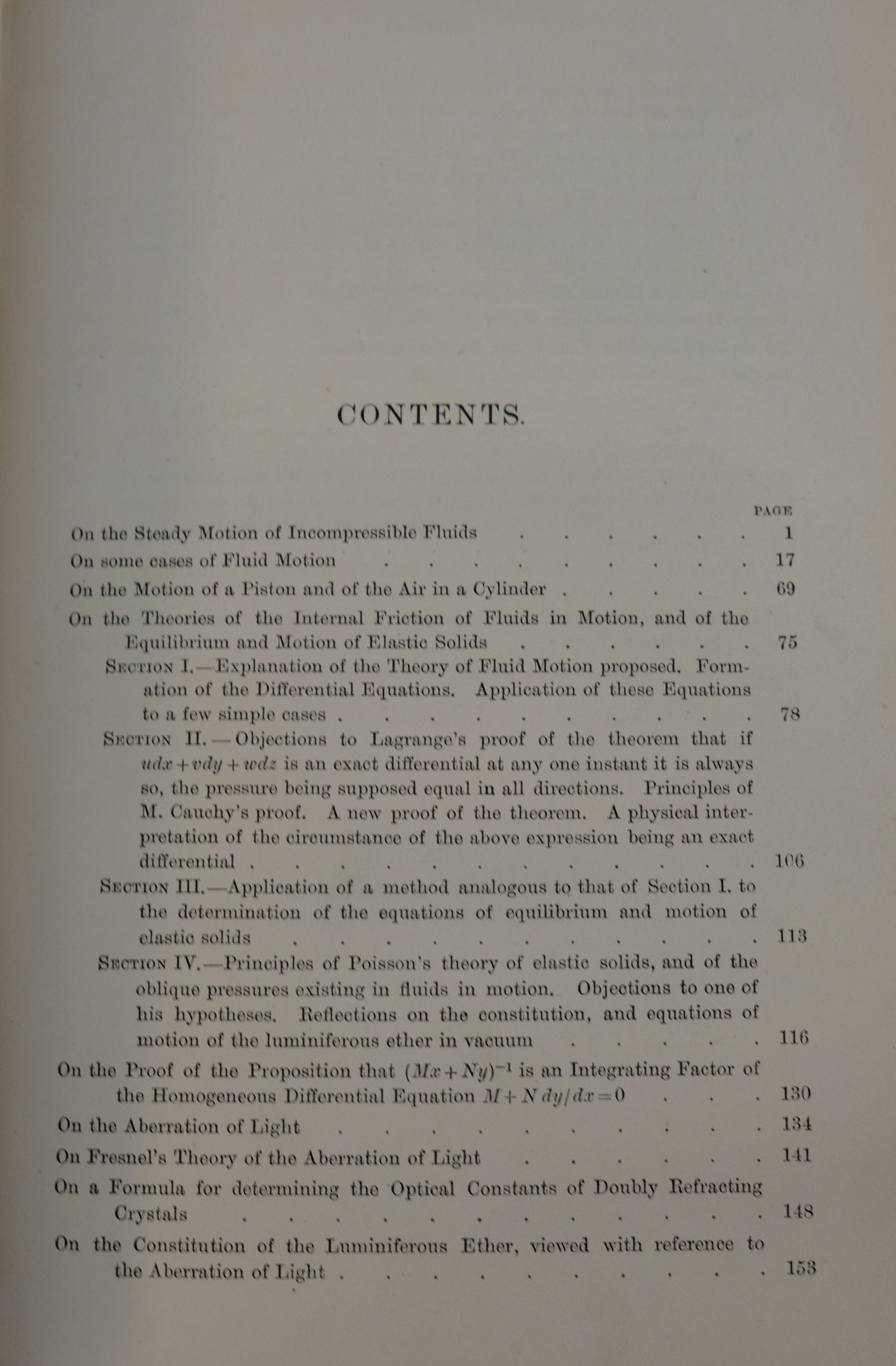
Table of contents to Volume I of Mathematical and Physical Papers (1880)

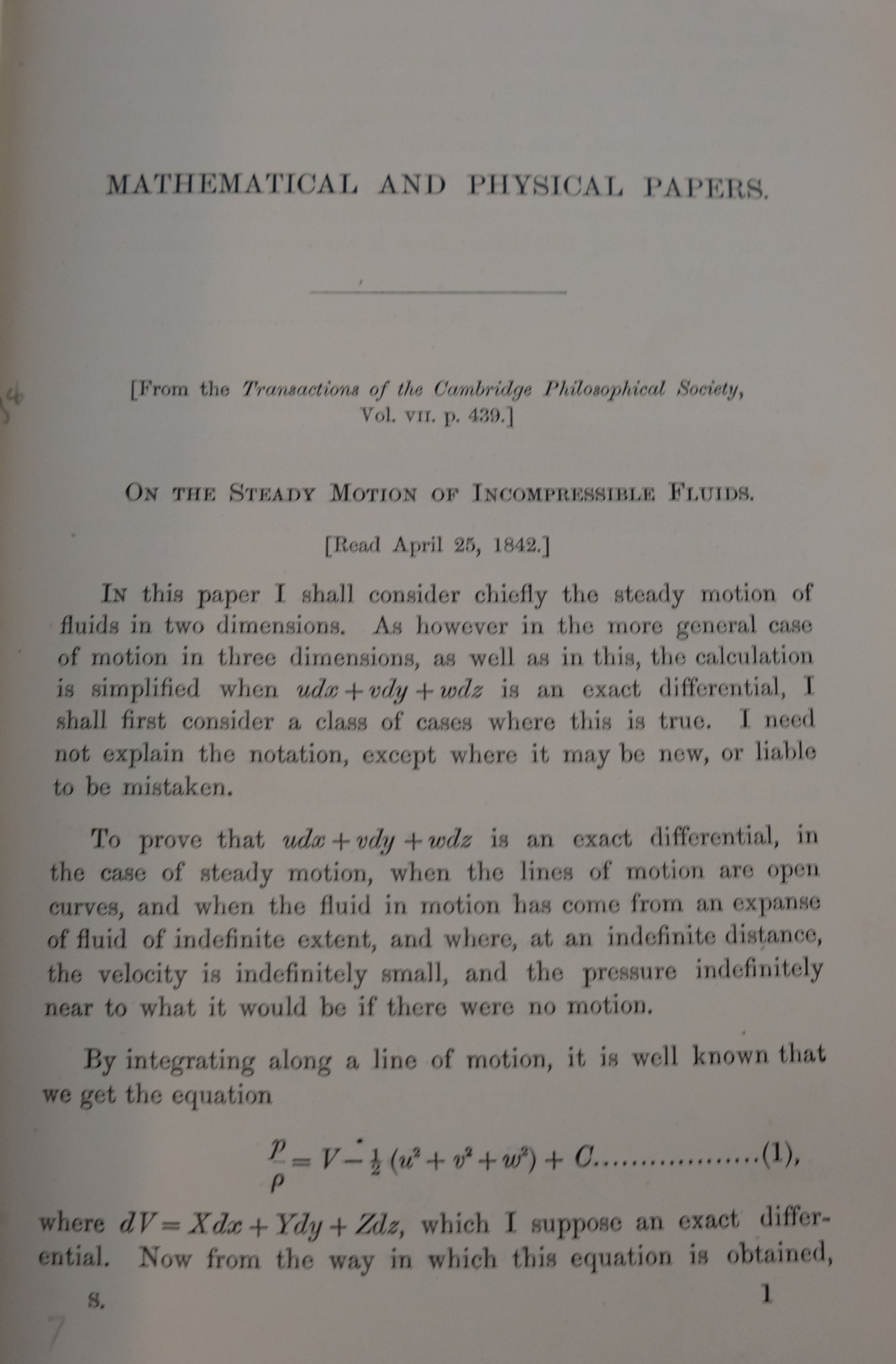
First page of Volume I of Mathematical and Physical Papers (1880)

== See also ==
- Stokes flow
- List of presidents of the Royal Society

Parliament of the United Kingdom
Preceded by Henry Cecil Raikes; Alexander Beresford Hope	Member of Parliament for Cambridge University; 1887 – 1892; With: Henry Cecil Raikes to 1891; Sir Richard Claverhouse Jebb from 1891	Succeeded by Sir Richard Claverhouse Jebb; Sir John Eldon Gorst
Baronetage of the United Kingdom
New creation	Baronet (of Lensfield Cottage); 1889–1903	Succeeded by Arthur Stokes
Professional and academic associations
Preceded by Thomas Henry Huxley	35th President of the Royal Society; 1885–1890	Succeeded by William Thomson
Academic offices
Preceded by Charles Edward Searle	Master of Pembroke College, Cambridge; 1902–1903	Succeeded by Arthur James Mason
