= Danube Flats =

Skyscraper in Vienna, Austria

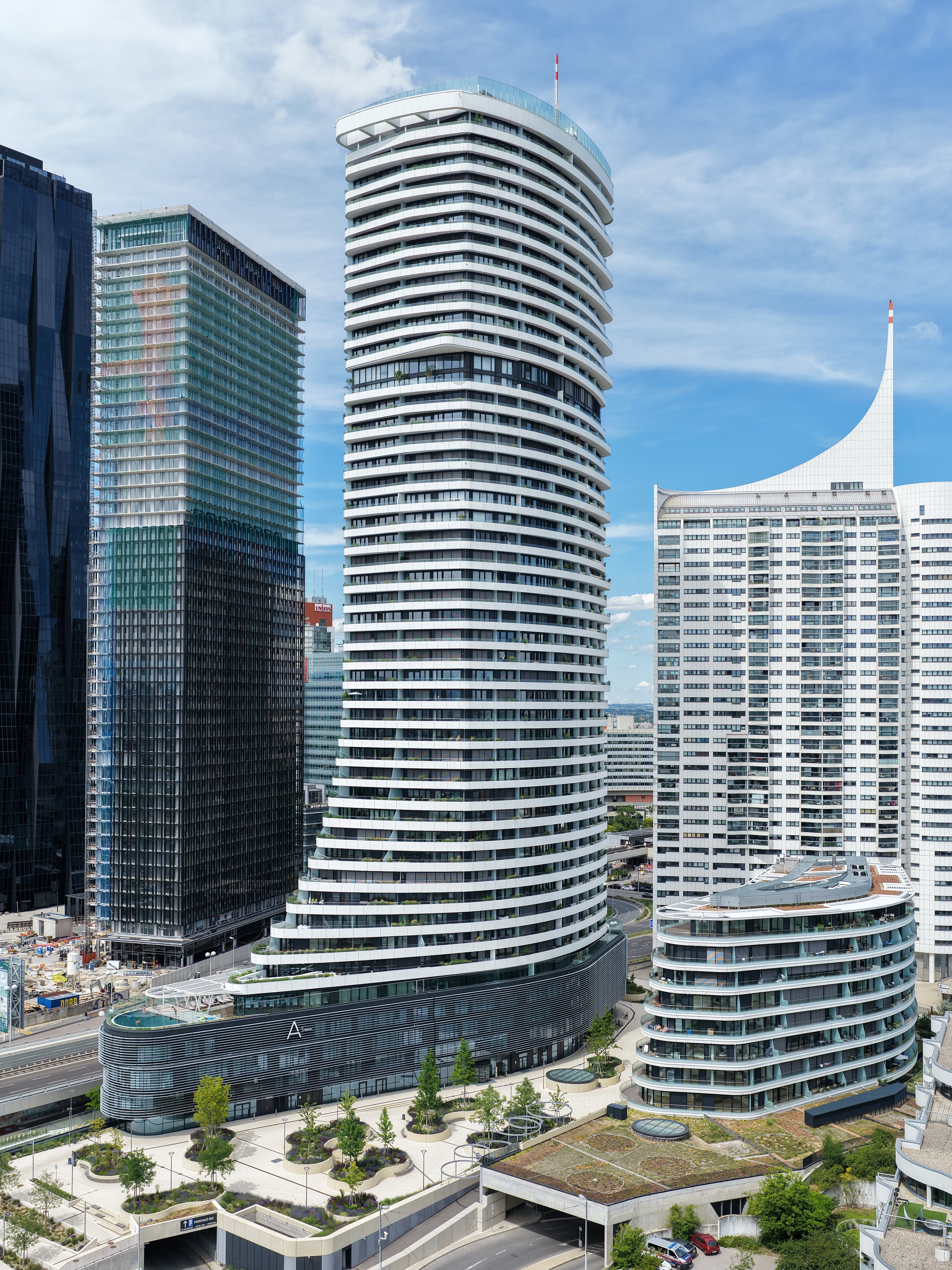

General information
- Status: Completed
- Type: Residential
- Architectural style: Postmodern
- Location: Vienna, Austria, 2 Wagramer Strasse
- Coordinates: 48.23031°N 16.41470°E
- Construction started: 2020
- Completed: 2024
- Owner: S+B Gruppe AG; Soravia Group

Height
- Roof: 182 m (597 ft)

Technical details
- Structural system: Concrete
- Floor count: 48

Design and construction
- Architect: A01 architects
- Developer: S+B Gruppe AG
- Structural engineer: KS Ingenieure ZT; Doka GmbH (framework)
- Main contractor: Granit Gesellschaft

The Danube Flats is a residential skyscraper in the Donau City district of Vienna, Austria. Built between 2020 and 2024, the tower stands at 182 m (597 ft) tall with 48 floors and is the current 3rd tallest building in both Vienna and Austria.

== History ==
=== Architecture ===
The tower houses a total of approximately 600 privately financed condominiums and investment apartments spread across 48 floors. Since its inauguration, it has been the tallest residential building in Austria. Construction began in April 2019, and completion was planned for 2023, but was delayed until 2024.

On April 19, 2012, the tender documents for the Danube Flats project were handed over to a group of architectural teams. The objective of this competition was to develop a residential quarter with attractive uses, particularly on the ground and basement floors, on the approximately 1.24-hectare property at Wagramer Straße 2.

On September 5, 2012, the decision was made in favor of the design proposed by the Vienna architectural firm of A01 architects.

On November 16, 2018, the Supreme Administrative Court of Austria upheld the building permit for the "Danube Flats" high-rise project in Donaustadt, thereby rejecting complaints from local residents. The previous building was demolished by the end of 2018, and excavation work began in April 2019. Construction of the building itself started in the first quarter of 2021.

=== Criticism ===
The Kaisermühlen Initiative argues that the construction of the Danube Flats building could lead to a decline in the quality of life for the residents of the Hochhaus Neue Donau building, partly due to the obstructed view of the Danube and partly due to a feared increase in noise and wind.

The main criticism, however, is that in the important urban development area of Donau City, the developers Soravia and S+B Group were primarily looking forward to creating privately financed luxury apartments instead of affordable housing units.

== See also ==
- List of tallest buildings in Austria
- List of tallest buildings in Vienna
