= Andromeda Tower =

Skyscraper in Vienna, Austria

- Andromeda Turm (German)
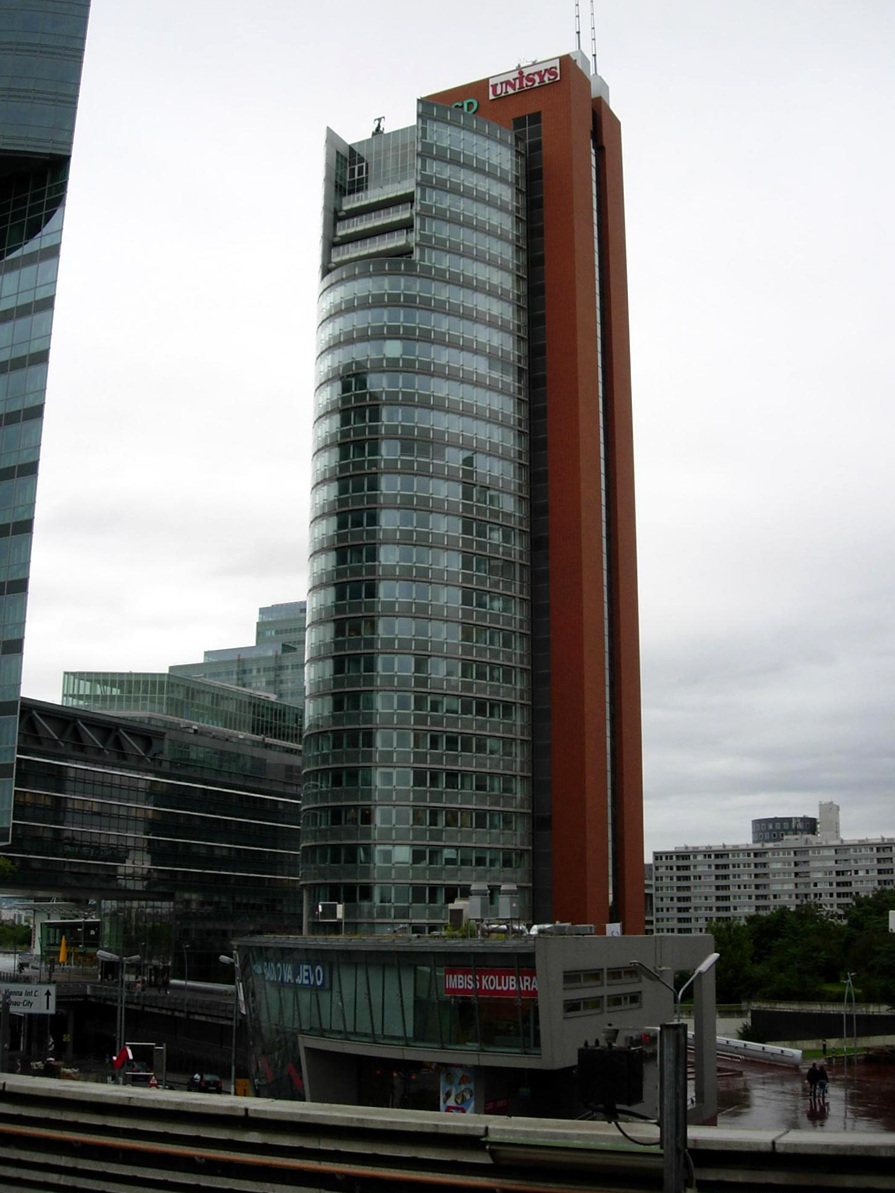
- Interactive map of the Andromeda Tower area

General information
- Status: Completed
- Type: Residential
- Location: Vienna, Austria, 6 Donau-City Straße, Vienna, Austria
- Coordinates: 48.23298°N 16.41417°E
- Construction started: 1996
- Completed: 1998

Height
- Antenna spire: 113 m (371 ft)
- Roof: 103.5 ft (31.5 m)

Technical details
- Structural system: Concrete
- Floor count: 29 (+3 underground)
- Floor area: 34,450 m^{2} (371,000 sq ft)
- Lifts/elevators: Kone

Design and construction
- Architect: Wilhelm Holzbauer
- Main contractor: Porr

The Andromeda Tower (German: Andromeda Turm) is a high-rise residential building in the Donaustadt district of Vienna, Austria. Built between 1996 and 1998, the tower stands at 113 m (371 ft) by antenna spire (103.5 ft (31.5 m) by roof) with 29 floors and is the current 20th tallest building in Austria.

== Architecture ==
The tower is located in the 22nd district of Vienna of Donaustadt. It was built between 1996 and 1998 according to plans by Wilhelm Holzbauer as the first building in the new district of Donau City. It was named after the figure Andromeda from Greek mythology.

The developer was WED Wiener Entwicklungsgesellschaft für den Donauraum AG, which sold the building to Billa founder Karl Wlaschek for a reported 57 million euros after completion. While the basement floors house shops, service companies and restaurants, the upper floors house offices. Tenants include the Permanent Missions of Japan and Austria to International Organizations, the computer company Unisys, ATB AG and General Electric.

The Andromeda Tower has a floor area of 34,450 m^{2} (371,000 sq ft), spread over 29 floors. Its roof height is 103.5 meters, and including the antennas it measures 113 meters. This makes it one of the tallest buildings in Vienna.

== See also ==
- List of tallest buildings in Austria
- List of tallest buildings in Vienna
