= The One (Vienna) =

Skyscraper in Vienna, Austria

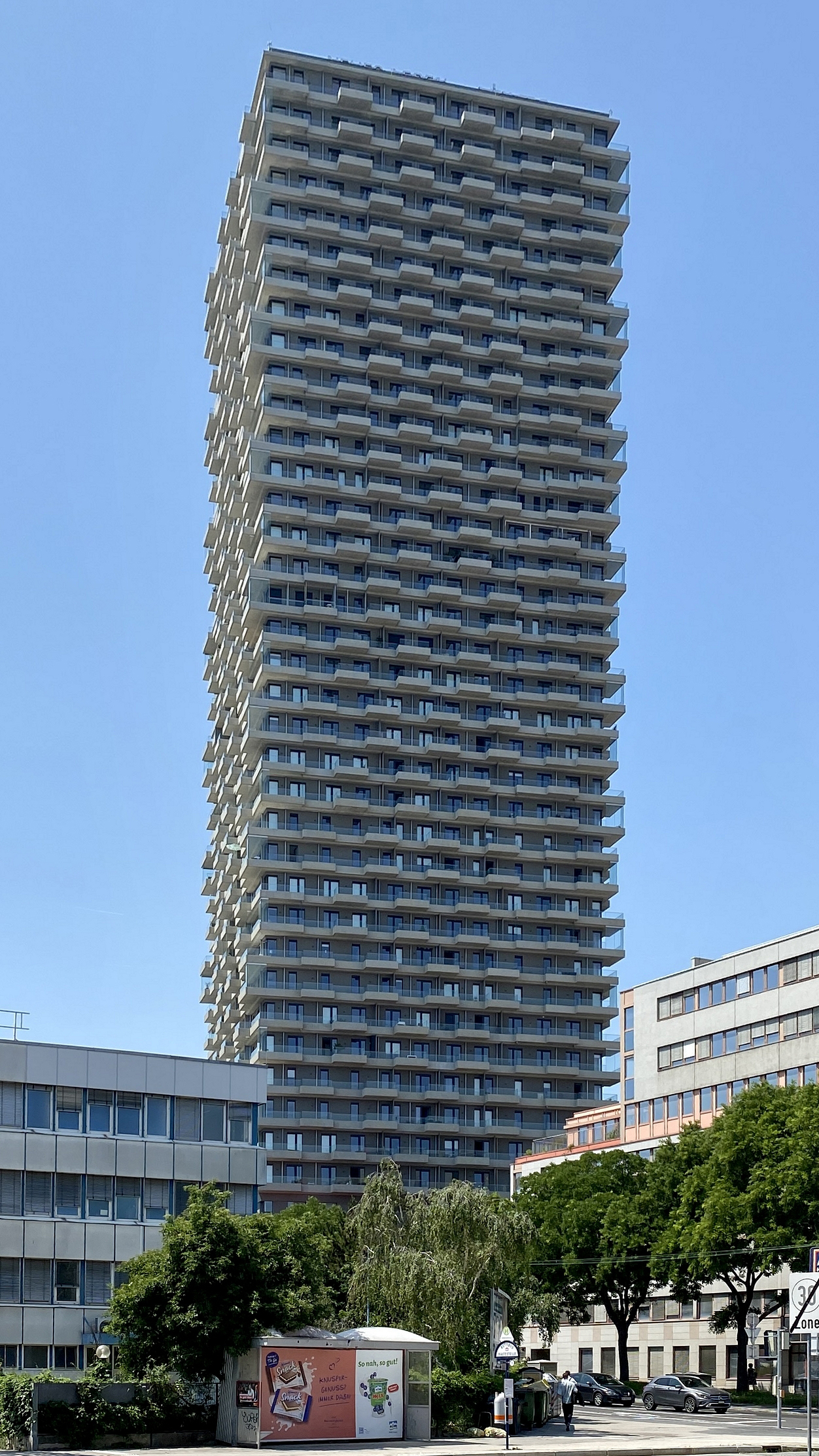
- Interactive map of the The One area

General information
- Status: Completed
- Type: Residential
- Location: Vienna, Austria, 20 Modecenterstraße
- Coordinates: 48.18452°N 16.41379°E
- Construction started: 2020
- Completed: 2023
- Cost: €110,000,000

Height
- Roof: 128 m (420 ft)

Technical details
- Structural system: Concrete
- Floor count: 39
- Lifts/elevators: 4

Design and construction
- Architect: Studio Vlay Streeruwitz
- Structural engineer: Doka GmbH (framework)

Website
- The One

The One also known as the MGC Plaza 1 is a residential skyscraper in the Landstraße district of Vienna, Austria. Built between 2020 and 2023, the tower stands at 128 m (420 ft) with 39 floors and is the current 7th tallest building in Austria.

== History ==
=== Architecture ===
The residential tower was designed by the architectural firm StudioVlayStreeruwitz. The Housing Association for Private Employees (WBV-GPA) and Neues Leben began construction in 2019 and completed in 2023. The construction costs were estimated at 110 million euros.

Of the total of 402 apartment units housed in the tower, 178 are available for rent. The remaining 224 apartments are privately financed and are all located on the upper floors.

The One shares the base zone with the neighboring skyscrapers Helio Tower and Q-Tower.

== Gallery ==
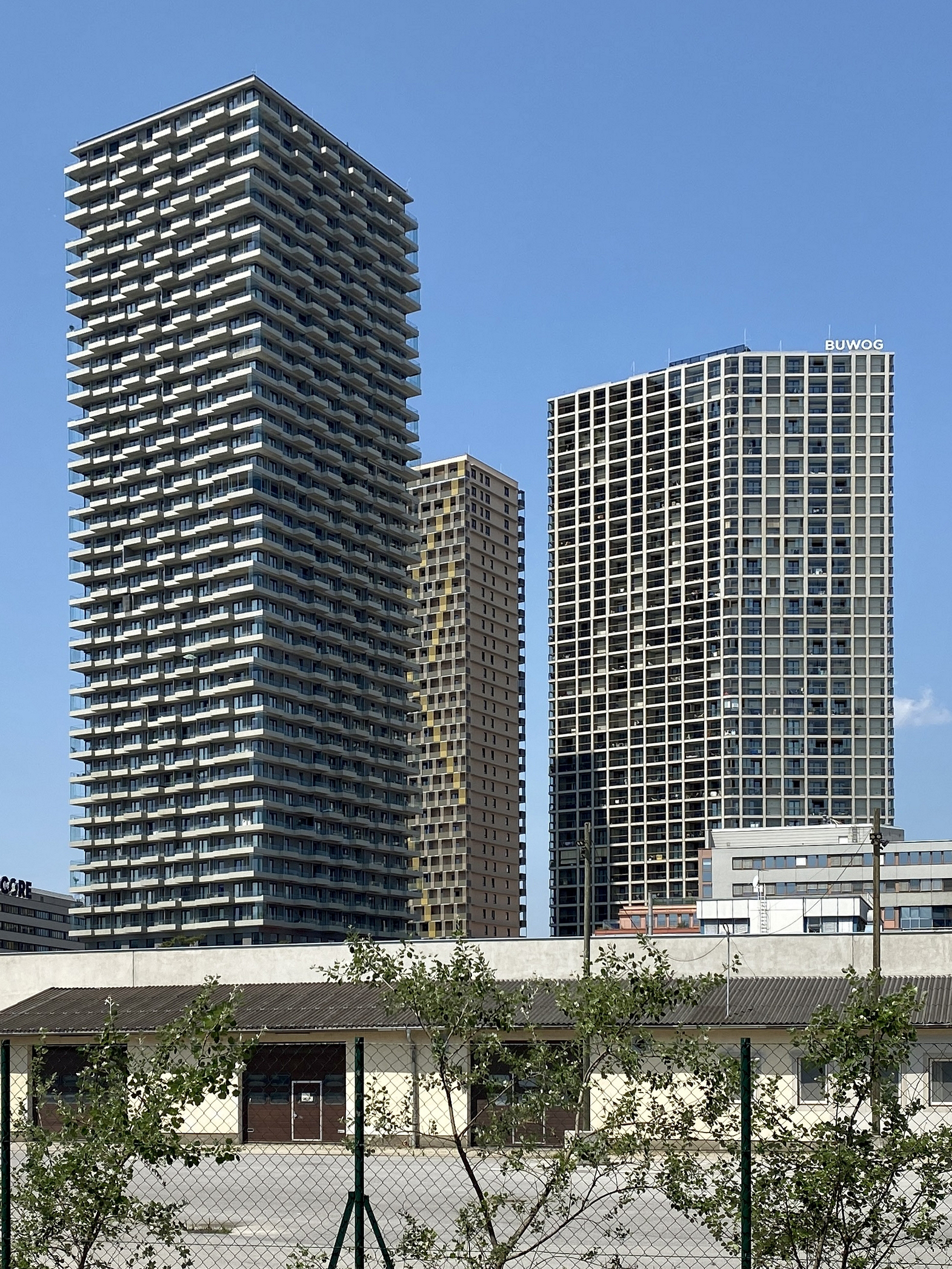
The One (left) as part of the building complex "The Marks" with Q-Tower (back) and Helio Tower (right)

== See also ==
- List of tallest buildings in Austria
- List of tallest buildings in Vienna
