= Vienna Twin Tower =

Building complex in Vienna, Austria

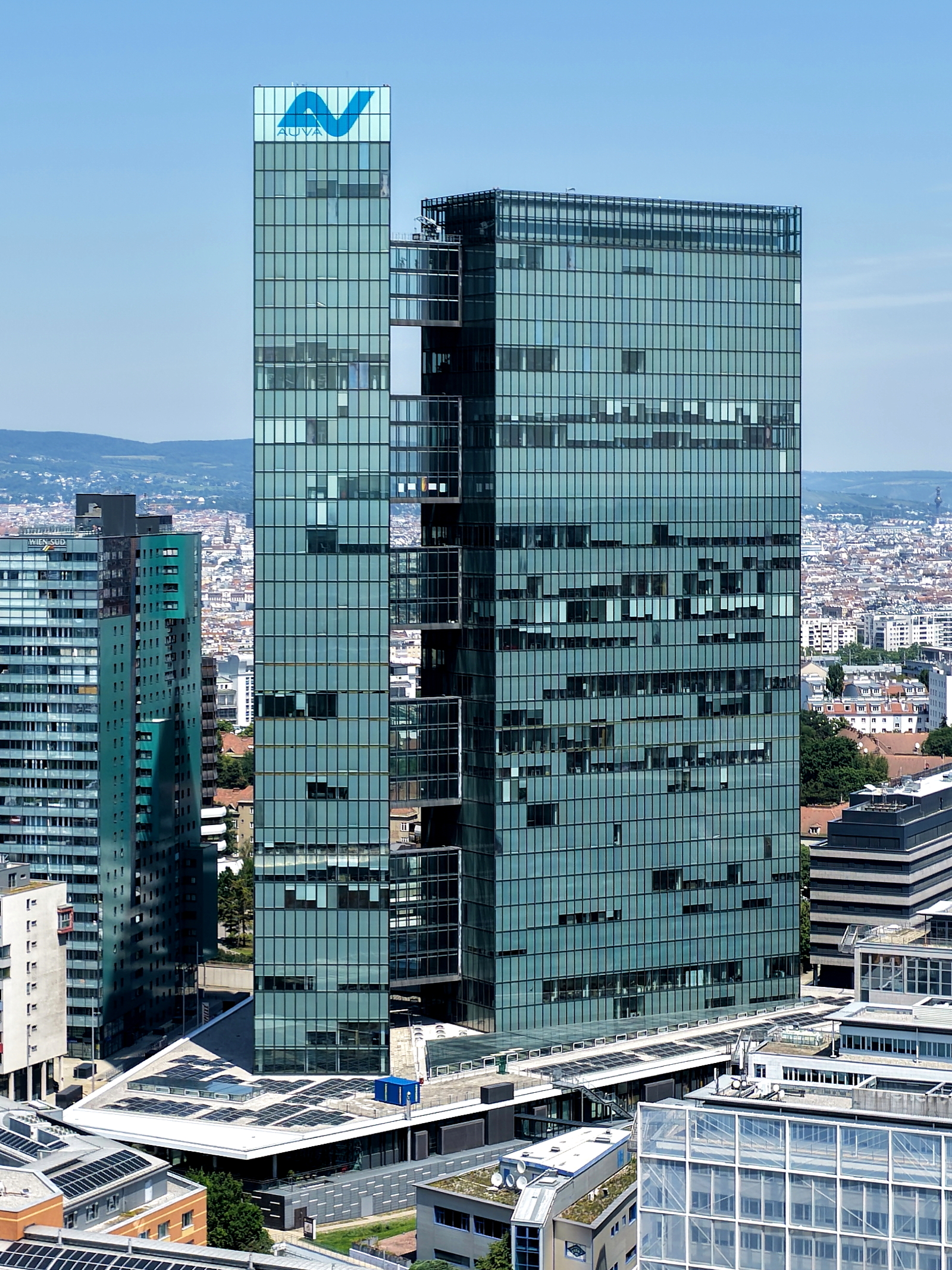
- South view of the Vienna Twin Tower
- Interactive map of the Vienna Twin Tower area

General information
- Location: Vienna, Austria
- Coordinates: 48°10′08″N 16°20′49″E
- Construction started: 1999
- Completed: 2001

Height
- Roof: 138 m (453 ft) and 127 m (417 ft)

Technical details
- Floor count: 37
- Floor area: more than 100,000 m^{2} (1,100,000 ft^{2})

Design and construction
- Architect: Massimiliano Fuksas

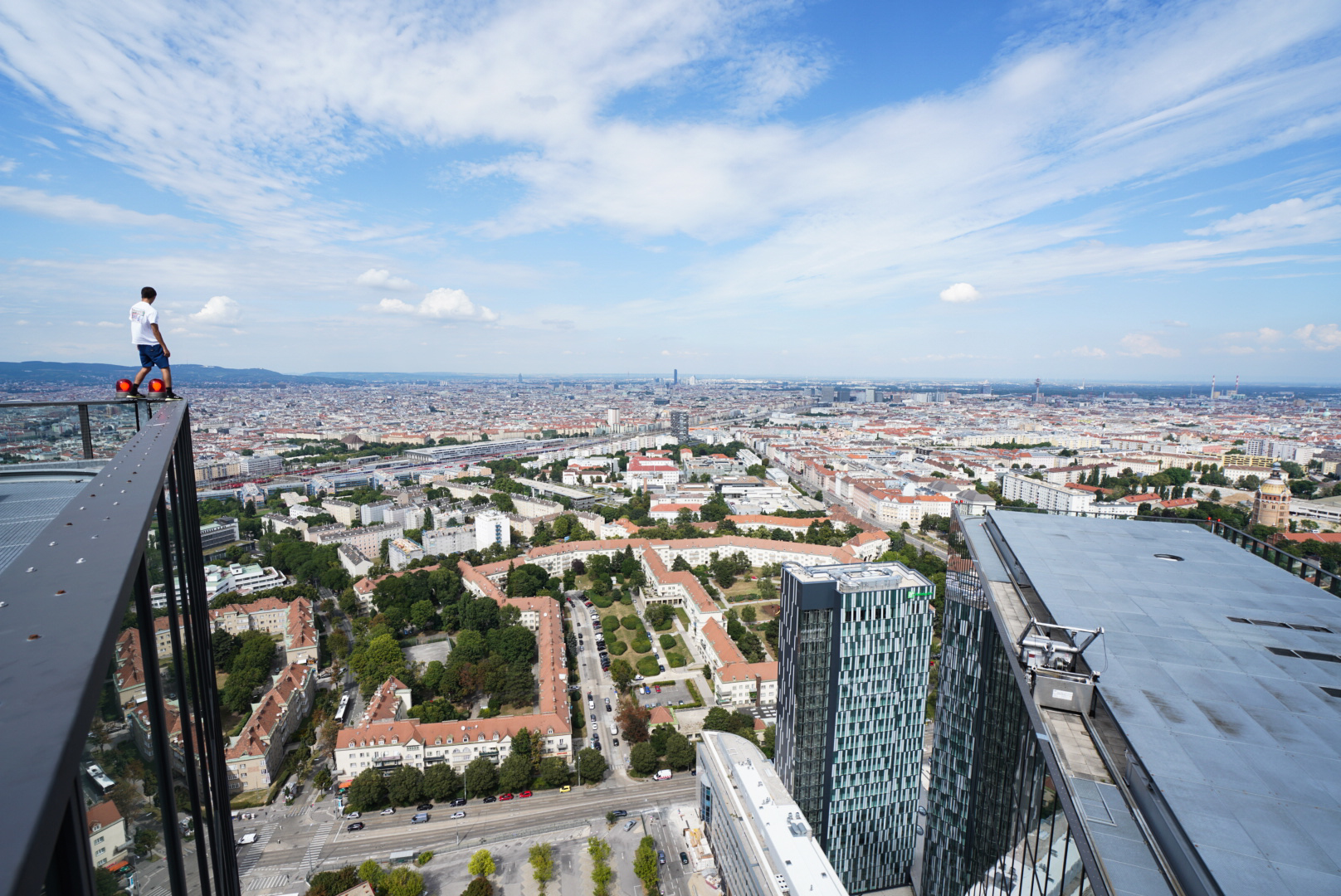
A rooftopper stands on the edge of the Twin Tower with Vienna in the background.

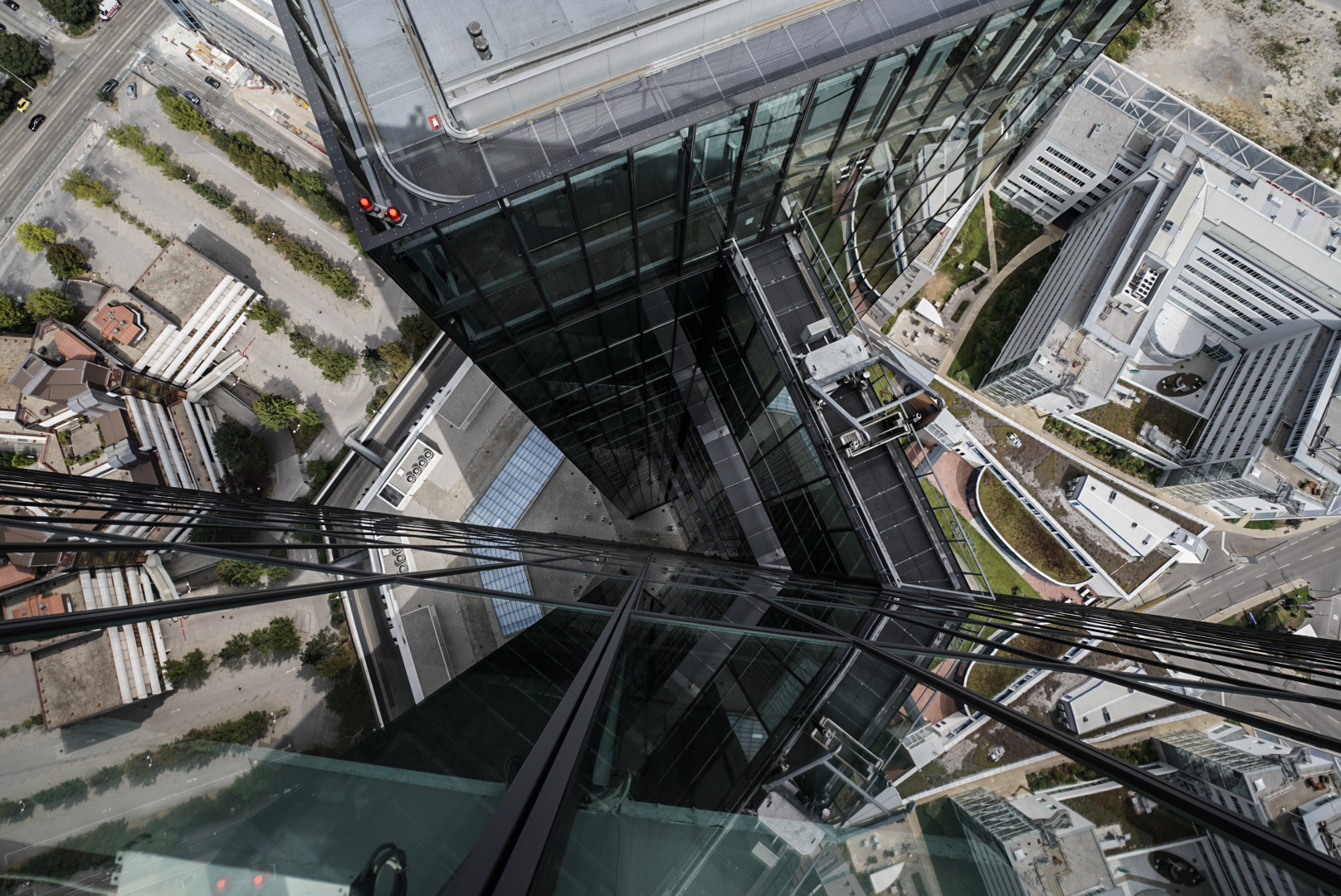
Twin Tower lookdown from the roof.

The Vienna Twin Tower is a building complex located in the Wienerberg City in Favoriten, the tenth district of Vienna. The complex is located near the Wienerberg, on the Wienerbergstraße and near Triester Straße. The complex is built in the High-tech style.

The twin building is the tallest building in the newly built quarter, which is currently mostly a series of apartment and office buildings. Construction began in 1999 and finished in 2001. The highrise has 37 floors above ground and office space of over 100,000 square metres. The tower is composed of two building halves connected at an obtuse corner. One is 138 metres high, the other 127, and they also connect through several bridges. The architect was Massimiliano Fuksas, and the project was financed by Wienerberger Baustoffindustrie AG and the Immofinanz Immobilien Anlagen AG. Inside there is a conference centre and ten-screen movie theatre as well as a number of cafés and restaurants. Its garage has 1,000 parking places.

The Vienna Twin Town lies on the city edge of Vienna, directly next to the recreation area of Wienerberg with a golf course nearby. However, the location has the disadvantage of being difficult to access public transportation. Currently, there is a connection through three bus lines and a newly established shuttle bus to reach the U-Bahn 6 line station at the Philadelphiabrücke (Philadelphia Bridge).

== See also ==
- List of tallest buildings in Austria
- List of tallest buildings in Vienna
