= List of tallest buildings in Vienna =

Skyline of Vienna Skyline von Wien
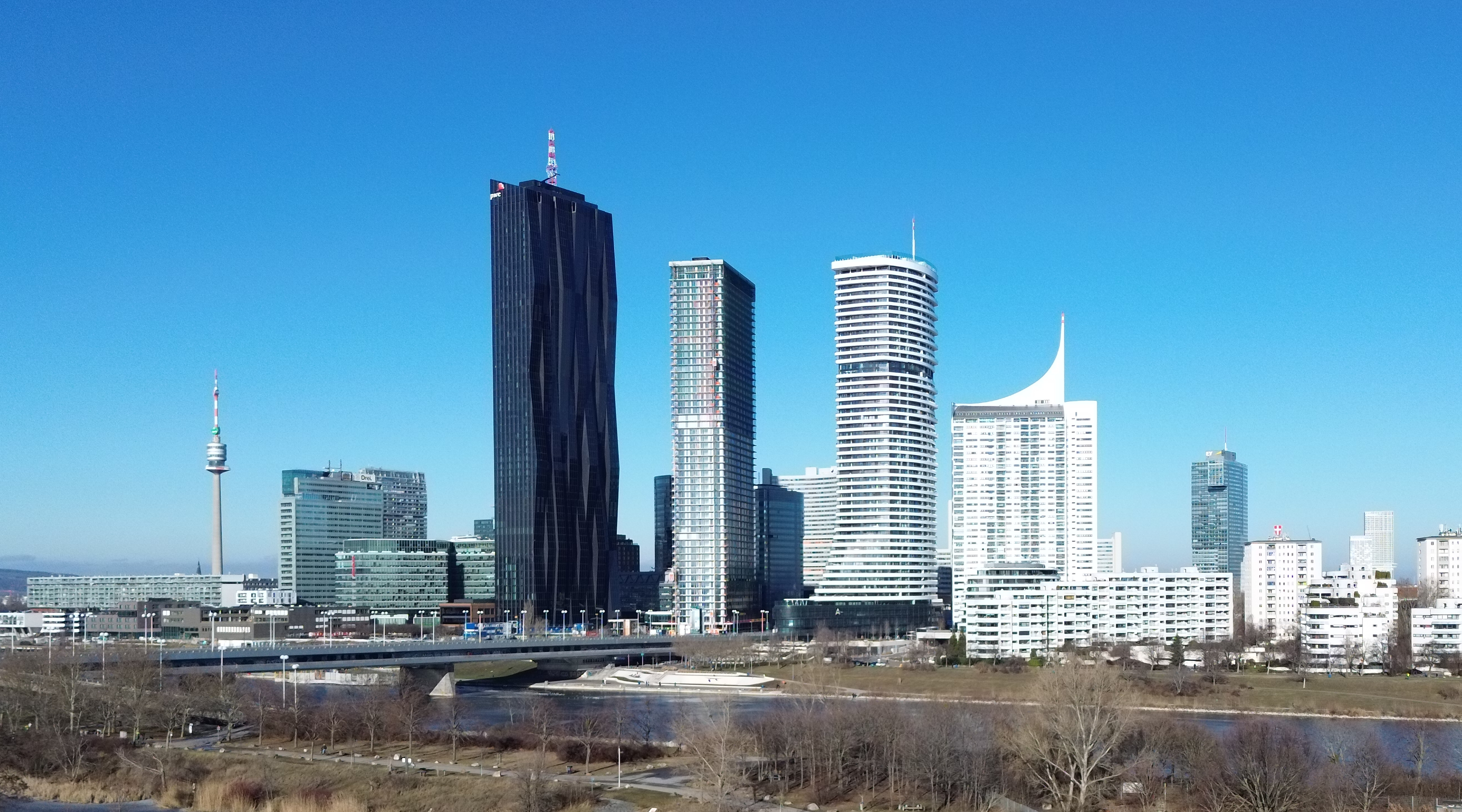
- Donau City in 2026
- Tallest building: DC Tower I (2013)
- Tallest building height: 220 m (722 ft)
- Tallest structure: Donauturm (1964)
- Tallest structure height: 252 m (827 ft)
- Major clusters: Donau City; Wienerberg City; TownTown
- First 150 m+ building: Millennium City (1999)

Number of tall buildings (2026)
- Taller than 100 m (328 ft): 26
- Taller than 150 m (492 ft): 6
- Taller than 200 m (656 ft): 2

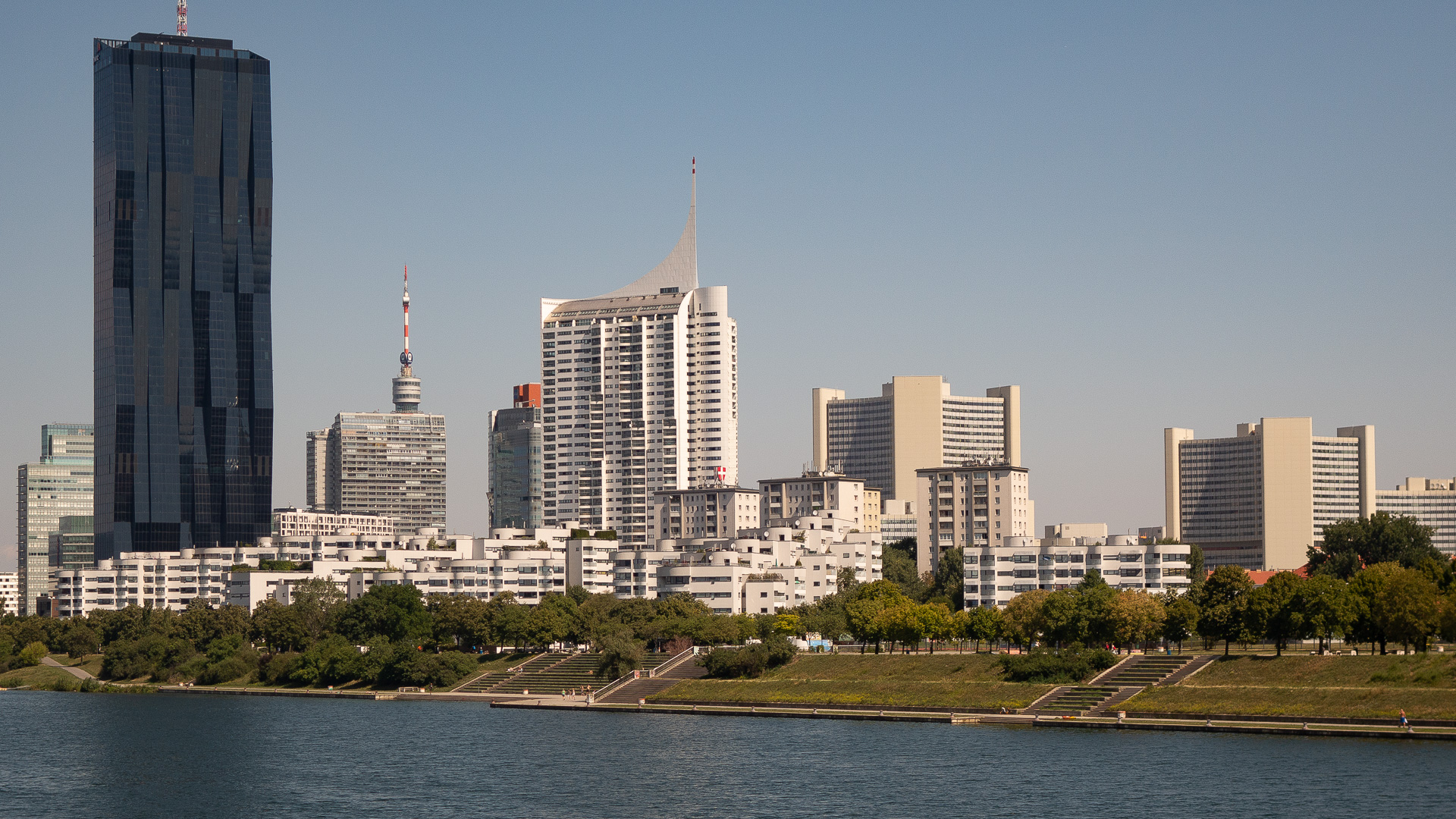
DC Tower 1 (left) and the Vienna International Centre (right)

Vienna is the capital and largest city of Austria, with two million inhabitants and a metropolitan area population of nearly three million. Vienna is home to most of the tallest buildings in Austria. The city has over 200 completed high-rises, including 26 buildings that stand taller than 100 metres (328 ft) as of 2026. Six skyscrapers have a height of over 150 metres (492 ft). The tallest skyscraper in Vienna is DC Tower I, a 60-story mixed-use building reaching a height of 220 m (722 ft). Vienna's skyline is one of the largest in the European Union. It has the third most buildings taller than 100 m and 150 m of any city in Central Europe, after Frankfurt and Warsaw.

High-rises in Vienna are spread out throughout the city, with the largest grouping of skyscrapers in Donau City, a neighborhood in the Donaustadt district directly north of the Danube. There are very few high-rises in the historic city centre, which is surrounded by the Ringstrasse. Some of Vienna's tallest buildings are standalone skyscrapers that are much taller than their surroundings, including Millennium Tower, Marina Tower, and Florido Tower. For centuries since its completion in 1578 until 1999, the tallest structure in Vienna had been St. Stephen's Cathedral, whose tower reaches up to 137 m (449 ft) tall.

While Vienna was one of the most populous cities in the world during the early 20th century, only one high-rise was built in the city before World War II, that being the 16-story Hochhaus Herrengasse in 1932. Vienna underwent reconstruction after the war. A notable early high-rise was the Ringturm, one of the few tall buildings found within the Ringstrasse. Built in 1955, Ringturm serves as the headquarters of Vienna Insurance Group. In the 1970s, construction began on the Alterlaa social housing complex, featuring high-rises with distinctive setbacks on their lower floors. The Vienna International Centre (VIC) completed in 1979, hosts the United Nations Office at Vienna and consists of six distinctive Y-shaped office towers. The tallest has a height of 127 m (417 ft) and was the city's tallest building until 1999.

Beginning in the 1990s, Vienna would see a significant increase in the scale of high-rise development, with a surge in the early 2020s. The Millennium Tower in the Brigittenau district was the first to exceed both 150 m (492 ft) and 200 m (656 ft) in height. During this time, the Donau City area began to be developed into a modern neighborhood. Donau City has grown to be the neighborhood with the tallest buildings in Austria. The centrepiece of the Donau City skyline, DC Tower I was completed in 2012. The DC Towers complex expanded with two more high-rises in the 2020s. In addition to Donau City, other high-rise districts such as Wienerberg City in Favoriten and TownTown in Landstraße have emerged.

== History ==
Number of buildings by height in Vienna by the end of each year, based on the information in this article. Click on the legend to toggle a specific height on or off. View chart definition.

== Map of tallest buildings ==
This map displays the location of all buildings taller than 100 m (328 ft) in Vienna. Each marker is numbered by the building's height rank, and coloured by the decade of its completion.

Buildings taller than 100 m (328 ft) in Vienna.
- 1970s
- 1980s
- 1990s
- 2000s
- 2010s
- 2020s
1 DC Tower I
2 Millennium Tower
3 Danube Flats
4 DC Tower II
5 VIENNA TWENTYTWO Tower Homes & Offices
6 Hochhaus Neue Donau
7 Vienna Twin Towers
8 Marina Tower
9 Austro Tower
10 IZD Tower
11 The One
12 Vienna International Centre Building A-B
13 TrIIIple Tower 3
14 TrIIIple Tower 1
15 Q-Tower
16 Florido Tower
17 Andromeda Tower
18 Hoch 33
19 DC Tower III
20 Helio Tower
21 Delugan Meissl Tower
22 VIENNA TWENTYTWO Living
23 Mischek Tower
24 Citygate Tower
25 TrIIIple Tower 2
26 ORBI Tower

== Cityscape ==
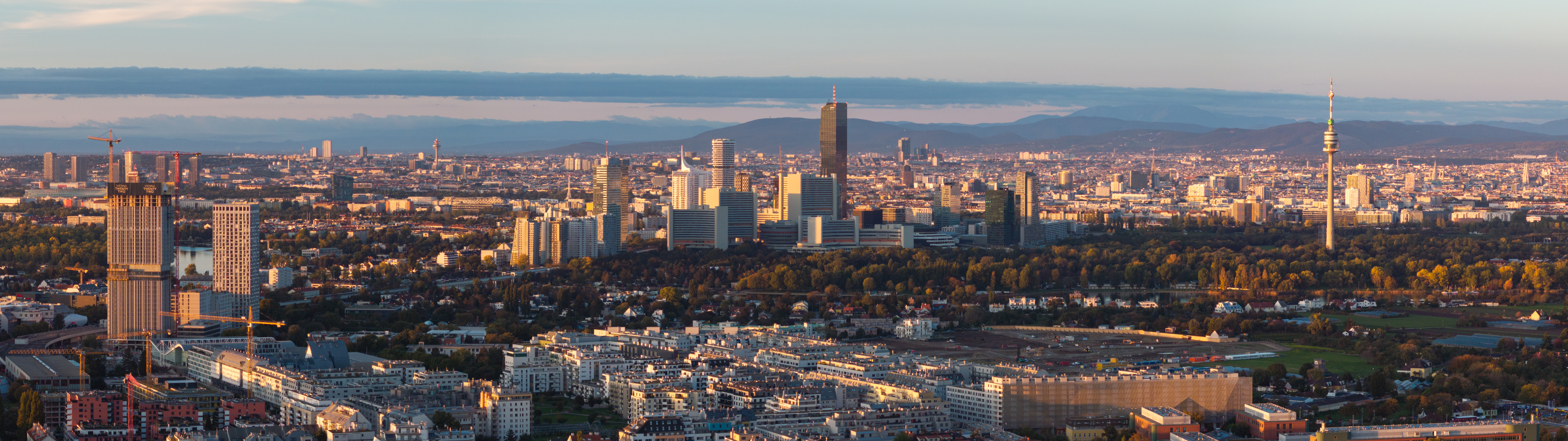
Skyline of Vienna in 2024

== Tallest buildings ==
This list ranks completed buildings in Vienna that stand at least 100 m (328 ft) tall as of 2026, based on standard height measurement. This includes spires and architectural details but does not include antenna masts. The “Year” column indicates the year of completion. Buildings tied in height are sorted by year of completion with earlier buildings ranked first, and then alphabetically.

Was the tallest building in Vienna upon completion

| Rank | Name | Image | Location | Height m (ft) | Floors | Year | Purpose | Notes |
|---|---|---|---|---|---|---|---|---|
| 1 | DC Tower I | | 48°13′55″N 16°24′47″E | 250 (820) | 60 | 2013 | Mixed-use | Tallest building in Vienna and Austria since 2013. Tallest building completed in Vienna in the 2010s. Mixed-use residential, office, and hotel building. |
| 2 | Millennium Tower | | 48°14′24″N 16°23′14″E | 202 (663) | 50 | 1999 | Mixed-use | Mixed-use residential and office building. |
| 3 | Danube Flats | | 48°13′50″N 16°24′52″E | 182 (597) | 48 | 2024 | Mixed-use | Mixed-use residential and hotel building. Tallest building completed in Vienna in the 2020s. |
| 4 | DC Tower II | | 48°13′53″N 16°24′49″E | 175 (574) | 53 | 2026 | Mixed-use | Mixed-use residential and office building. |
| 5 | IZD Tower | | 48°14′05″N 16°25′15″E | 162 (531) | 37 | 2001 | Office | Known as IZD Turm in German. |
| 6 | VIENNA TWENTYTWO Tower Homes & Offices | | 48°14′41″N 16°26′01″E | 155 (509) | 45 | 2026 | Mixed-use | Mixed-use residential and office building. |
| 7 | Hochhaus Neue Donau | | 48°13′51″N 16°24′56″E | 150 (492) | 34 | 2001 | Residential | Tallest building completed in Vienna in the 2000s. |
| 8 | Vienna Twin Towers Tower A | | 48°10′05″N 16°20′43″E | 138 (453) | 37 | 2001 | Office | |
| 9 | Marina Tower | | 48°12′23″N 16°25′51″E | 138 (453) | 41 | 2022 | Residential | |
| 10 | Austro Tower | | 48°11′37″N 16°24′47″E | 136.6 (448) | 36 | 2021 | Office | |
| 11 | The One | | 48°11′05″N 16°24′49″E | 128 (420) | 39 | 2023 | Residential | Also known as MGC Plaza 1. Shares a base with neighbouring high-rises Q-Tower and Helio Tower. |
| 12 | Vienna International Centre Building A | | 48°14′04″N 16°24′57″E | 127 (417) | 27 | 1978 | Office | Tallest building in Vienna from 1978 to 1999. Tallest building completed in Vienna in the 1970s. |
| 13 | Vienna Twin Towers Tower B | | | 127 (417) | 34 | 2001 | Office | |
| 14 | TrIIIple Tower 3 | | 48°11′42″N 16°24′40″E | 120.2 (394) | 35 | 2021 | Residential | |
| 15 | TrIIIple Tower 1 | | 48°11′40″N 16°24′44″E | 117.2 (385) | 34 | 2021 | Residential | |
| 16 | Q-Tower | | 48°11′06″N 16°24′45″E | 114 (374) | 35 | 2023 | Residential | Shares a base with neighbouring high-rises The One and Helio Tower. |
| 17 | Florido Tower | | 48°15′10″N 16°23′33″E | 113 (371) | 31 | 2001 | Office | Also known as Peak Vienna. |
| 18 | Andromeda Tower | | 48°13′59″N 16°24′51″E | 113 (371) | 29 | 1998 | Office | |
| 19 | Hoch 33 | | 48°09′59″N 16°23′20″E | 110 (361) | 31 | 2019 | Office | Also known as Monte Laa Towers. |
| 20 | DC Tower III | | 48°13′54″N 16°24′54″E | 109.4 (359) | 34 | 2022 | Residential | Serviced apartments. |
| 21 | Helio Tower | | 48°11′07″N 16°24′49″E | 109 (358) | 33 | 2023 | Residential | Shares a base with neighbouring high-rises The One and Q-Tower. |
| 22 | Delugan Meissl Tower | | 48°10′07″N 16°20′38″E | 108.5 (356) | 34 | 2005 | Residential | |
| 23 | VIENNA TWENTYTWO Living | | 48°14′38″N 16°25′56″E | 108.5 (356) | 33 | 2022 | Residential | |
| 24 | Mischek Tower | | 48°14′09″N 16°24′43″E | 108 (354) | 36 | 1999 | Residential | |
| 25 | Citygate Tower | | 48°15′48″N 16°27′12″E | 108 (354) | 36 | 2015 | Residential | |
| 27 | TrIIIple Tower 2 | | 48°11′41″N 16°24′42″E | 107.7 (353) | 31 | 2021 | Residential | |
| 28 | ORBI Tower | | 48°11′34″N 16°24′48″E | 102.4 (336) | 26 | 2017 | Office | |
| 26 | Vienna International Centre Building D | | | 100,9 (331) | 27 | 1979 | Office | |
| 29 | Ares Tower | | | 100 (328) | 26 | 2001 | Office | |
| 30 | Schneewittchen | | | 100 (328) | 30 | 2024 | Residential | |

== Tallest under construction or proposed ==
=== Under construction ===
The following table includes buildings under construction in Vienna that are planned to be at least 100 m (328 ft) tall as of 2026, based on standard height measurement. The “Year” column indicates the expected year of completion. Buildings that are on hold are not included.

| Name | Height m (ft) | Floors | Year | Purpose | Notes |
|---|---|---|---|---|---|
| Weitblick | 120 (394) | 35 | 2028 | Mixed-use | Mixed-use hotel and office building. |

== Timeline of tallest buildings ==
This lists buildings that once held the title of the tallest building in Vienna.

| Name | Image | Years as tallest | Height m (ft) | Floors | References |
|---|---|---|---|---|---|
| Ringturm | | 1955–1977 | 71 (233) | 21 | |
| Wohnpark Alt Erlaa, Block A1-A4 | | 1977–1978 | 90 (295) | 27 | |
| Vienna International Centre Building A-B | | 1978–1999 | 127 (417) | 27 | |
| Millennium Tower | | 1999–2013 | 202 (663) | 50 | |
| DC Tower I | | 2013–present | 220 (722) | 60 | |

== See also ==
- List of tallest buildings in Austria
- List of tallest buildings in Bratislava
- List of tallest buildings in Frankfurt
