= Marina Tower (Vienna) =

Skyscraper in Vienna, Austria

- Marina Turm (German)
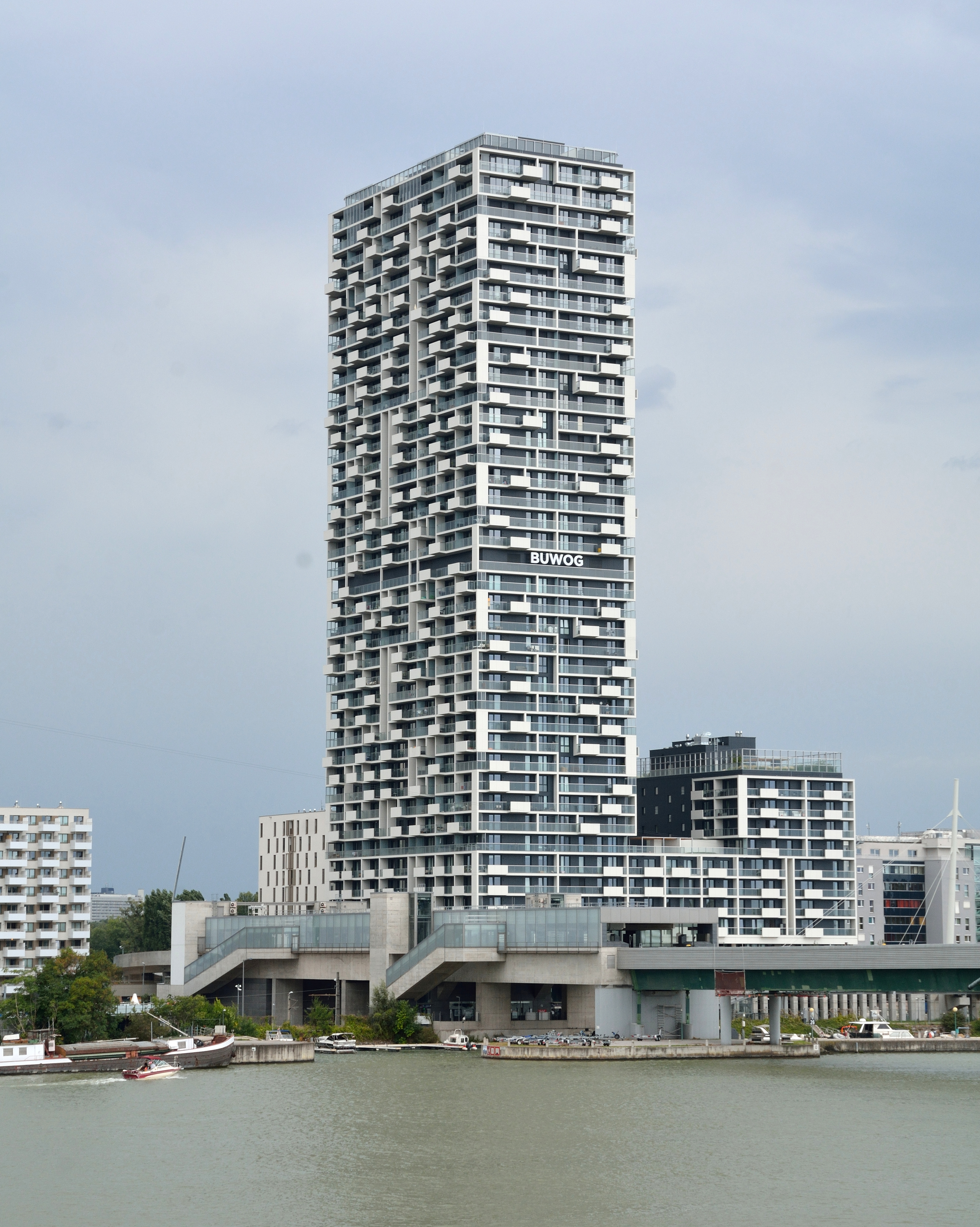
- Interactive map of the Marina Tower area

General information
- Status: Completed
- Type: Residential
- Location: Vienna, Austria, 291 Wehlistraße
- Coordinates: 48.20638°N 16.43059°E
- Construction started: 2018
- Completed: 2022

Height
- Roof: 138 m (453 ft)

Technical details
- Structural system: Concrete
- Floor count: 41
- Floor area: 63,090 m^{2} (679,000 sq ft)
- Lifts/elevators: Schindler

Design and construction
- Architects: Zechner & Zechner
- Developer: BUWOG; IES Immobilien-Projektentwicklung
- Structural engineer: KS Ingenieure ZT; Doka GmbH (framework)
- Main contractor: DYWIDAG DSI; Swietelsky AG

The Marina Tower (German: Marina Turm) is a high-rise residential building in the Leopoldstadt district of Vienna, Austria. Built between 2018 and 2022, the tower stands at 138 m (453 ft) with 41 floors and is the 4th tallest building in Austria.

== History ==
=== Architecture ===
The project is located in Vienna's 2nd district Leopoldstadt. The building's main developer is BUWOG and houses a total of 500 rentable condominium units. The architectural firm Zechner & Zechner was responsible for the planning. The high-rise was built by ARGE Swietelsky and Dywidag as general contractor.

The project stands as a significant feature on the Danube, linking the riverside to the city by overlaying the road and rail lines adjacent to the river.

The tower features apartments of various sizes, each equipped with outdoor areas, such as loggias or balconies. A playground for children is situated on the rooftop of the building's lower section. The program includes kindergarten facilities, a spa and fitness center, shops, restaurants, and various services, including concierge assistance.

The tower's high-rise and low-rise elements rest on a shared base, creating a multi-storey arcade along the street front facing the city. From this point, one can access the central atrium covered by glass, where the primary entrances can be found. The implementation of renewable energy sources like geothermal energy for heating and cooling, along with a well-insulated building envelope, is fundamental to the sustainable building concept.

A total of 24,000 m^{2} (258,000 sq ft) of ceramic tiles were applied to the floors and walls in the taller of the two towers utilizing various specialized Mapei products.

== Gallery ==
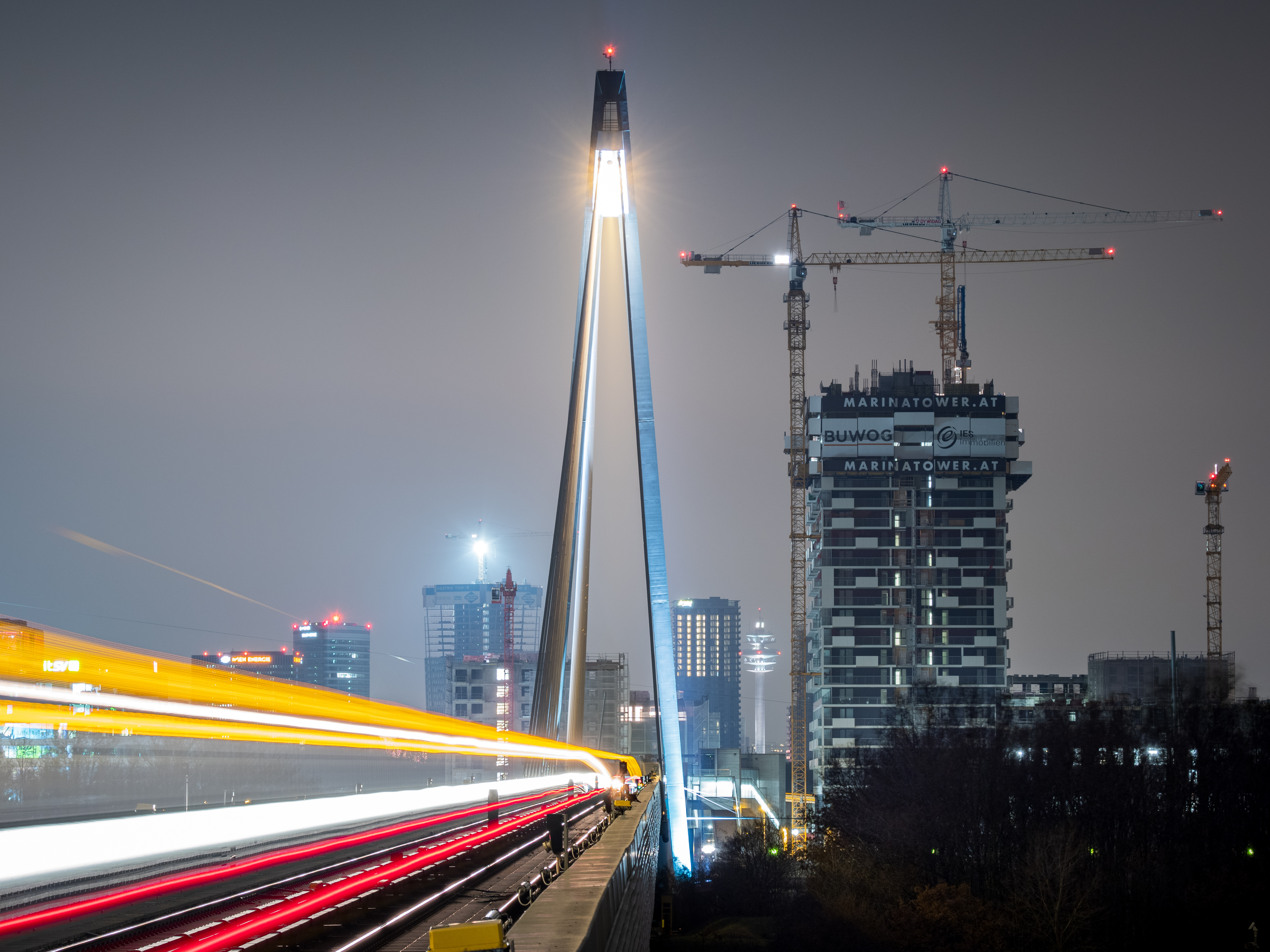
Marina Tower under construction in December 2020

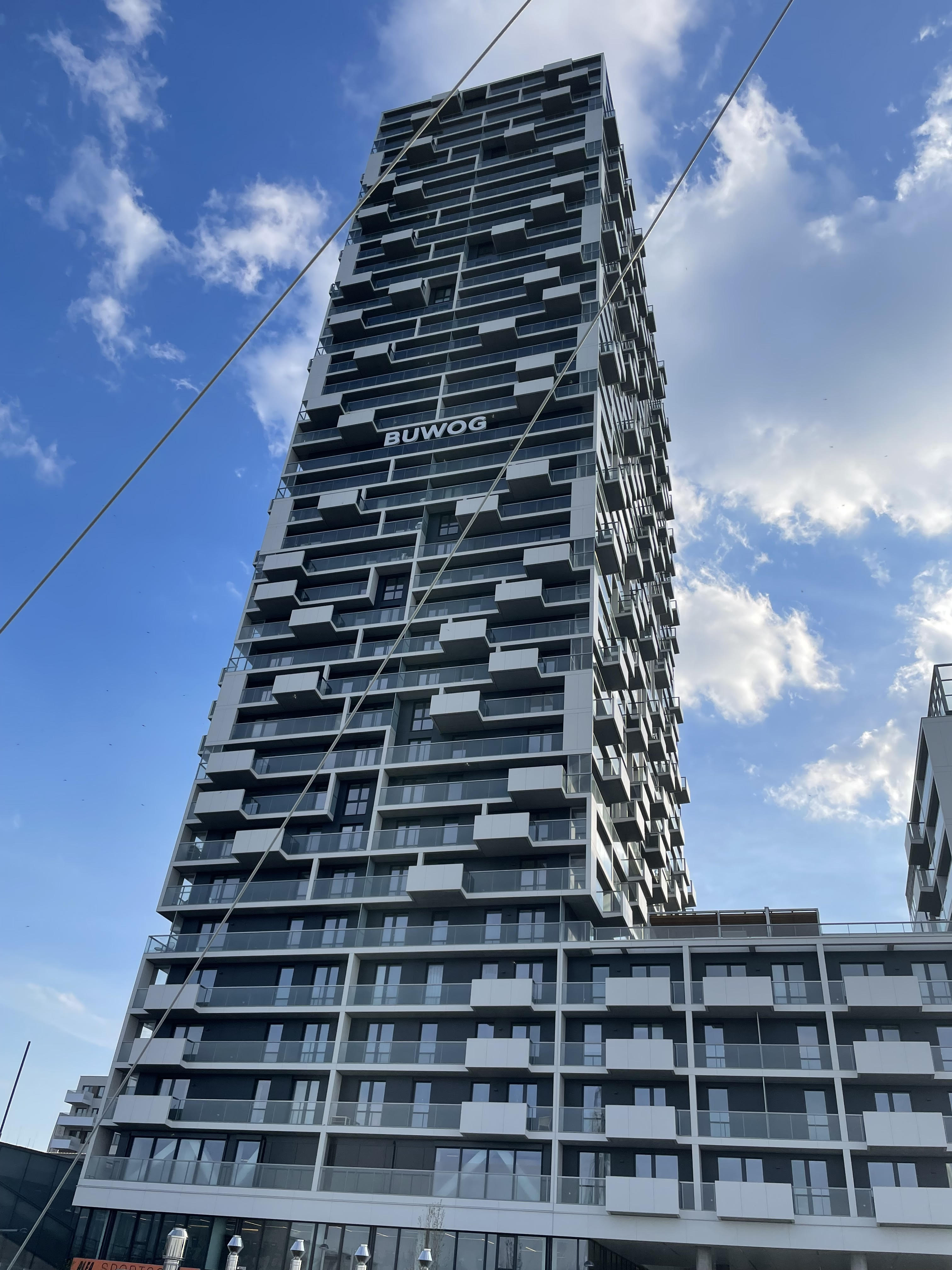
The high-rise building section

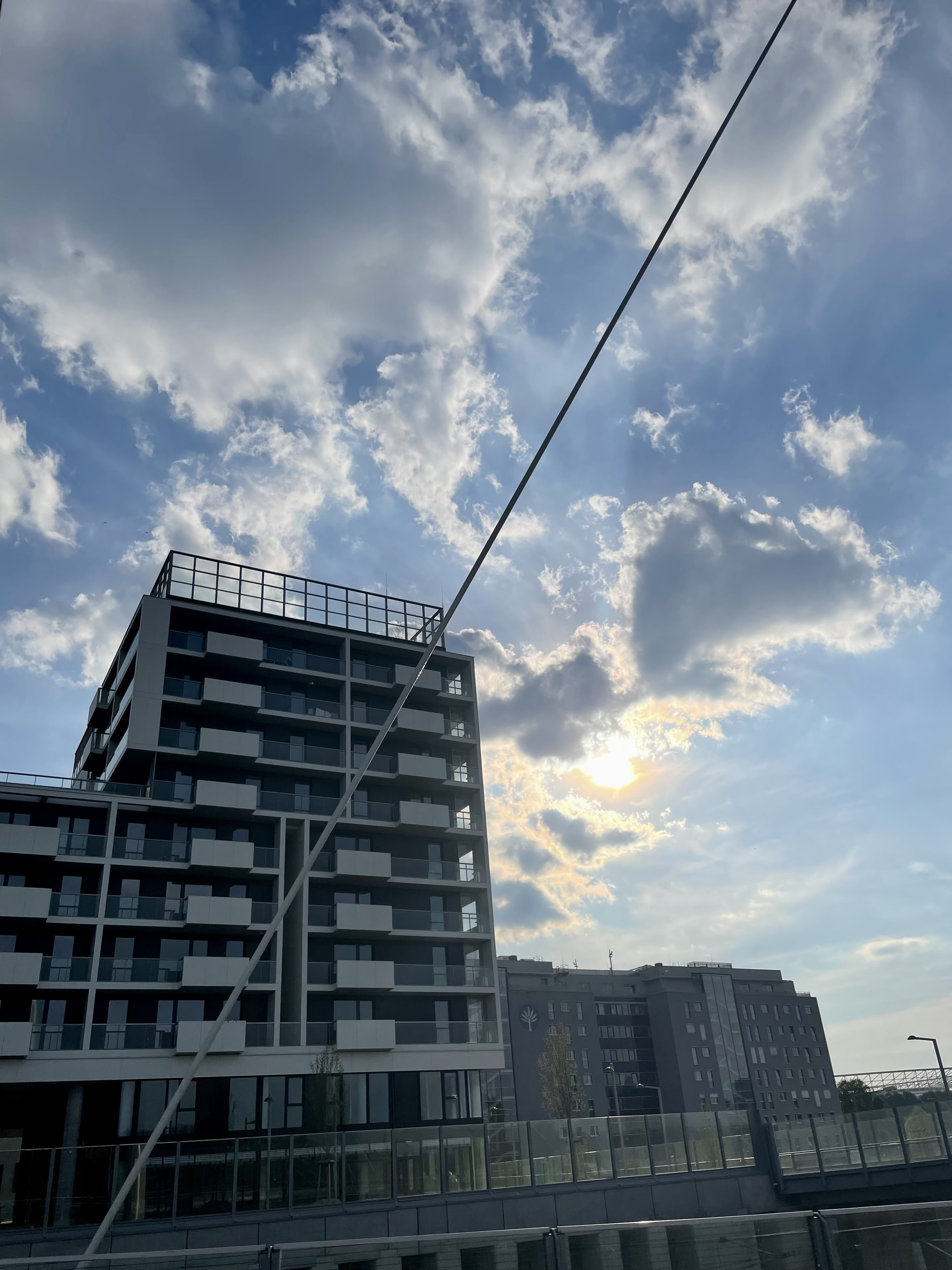
The lower-rise section seen from the Danube

== See also ==
- List of tallest buildings in Austria
- List of tallest buildings in Vienna
