= List of tallest buildings in Austria =

Vienna skyline in 2026

This list ranks the tallest buildings in Austria that stand at least 80 m (262 ft) tall. In accordance with standard architectural definitions, only habitable buildings are ranked; non-habitable structures such as radio masts, observation towers, steeples, and chimneys are excluded. For a comprehensive overview of all tall architectural structures in the country, see List of tallest structures in Austria.

== Tallest buildings ==
Was the tallest building in Austria upon completion
Indicates buildings that have been topped out but not yet completed

| Rank | Name | Image | City | Height m (ft) | Floors | Year built | Notes | References |
|---|---|---|---|---|---|---|---|---|
| 1 | DC Tower 1 | | Vienna | 250 m (821 ft) | 60 | 2014 | Tallest building in Austria since 2014. | |
| 2 | Millennium Tower | | Vienna | 202 m (663 ft) | 50 | 1999 | Tallest building in Austria from 1999 to 2014. Designed by Gustav Peichl, Boris Podrecca, and Rudolf Weber. | |
| 3 | Danube Flats | | Vienna | 182 m (597 ft) | 48 | 2024 | Tallest residential building in Austria. | |
| 4 | DC Tower 2 | | Vienna | 175 m (574 ft) | 53 | 2026 | Underwent drastic redesigns several times before construction. Is Europe´s first high-rise building which is clad with photovoltaic elements along the entire height of its facade and it generates its own electricity. | |
| 5 | IZD Tower | | Vienna | 162 m (525 ft) | 37 | 2001 | Designed by NFOG. | |
| 6 | VIENNA TWENTYTWO Tower Homes & Offices | | Vienna | 155 m (509 ft) | 45 | 2026 | | |
| 7 | Hochhaus Neue Donau | | Vienna | 150 m (492 ft) | 34 | 2001 | Tallest residential building in Austria from 2001 to 2024. | |
| 8 | Marina Tower | | Vienna | 140 m (459 ft) | 41 | 2022 | | |
| 9 | Vienna Twin Towers (Tower A) | | Vienna | 138 m (453 ft) | 35 | 2001 | | |
| 10 | Austro Tower | | Vienna | 136.6 m (448 ft) | 38 | 2021 | Headquarters of ASFINAG and Austro Control | |
| 11 | The One | | Vienna | 128 m (420 ft) | 39 | 2023 | Part of The Marks development | |
| 12 | Vienna Twin Towers (Tower B) | | Vienna | 127 m (417 ft) | 34 | 2001 | | |
| 12= | Vienna International Centre (Building A) | | Vienna | 127 m (417 ft) | 27 | 1979 | | |
| 13 | TrIIIple Tower 3 | | Vienna | 120.2 m (394 ft) | 35 | 2021 | | |
| 14 | TrIIIple Tower 1 | | Vienna | 117 m (384 ft) | 34 | 2021 | | |
| 15 | Q-Tower | | Vienna | 114 m (374 ft) | 35 | 2023 | Part of The Marks development | |
| 16 | Florido Tower | | Vienna | 113 m (371 ft) | 31 | 2001 | | |
| 16= | Andromeda Tower | | Vienna | 113 m (371 ft) | 29 | 1998 | | |
| 17 | ORBI Tower | | Vienna | 111 m (364 ft) | 27 | 2017 | | |
| 18 | Vienna Twentytwo Living | | Vienna | 110 m (361 ft) | 33 | 2022 | | |
| 18= | Mischek Tower | | Vienna | 110 m (361 ft) | 35 | 2000 | | |
| 18= | Hoch 33 | | Vienna | 110 m (361 ft) | 33 | 2018 | | |
| 18= | DC Tower 3 | | Vienna | 110 m (361 ft) | 34 | 2022 | | |
| 18= | HELIO Tower | | Vienna | 110 m (361 ft) | | 2022 | Part of The Marks development | |
| 19 | Quadrill-Tower | | Linz | 109 m (358 ft) | 27 | 2025 | Tallest building in Austria outside of Vienna | |
| 20 | Delugan Meissl Tower | | Vienna | 108.5 m (356 ft) | 34 | 2005 | | |
| 21 | TrIIIple Tower 2 | | Vienna | 108 m (354 ft) | 31 | 2021 | | |
| 22 | Vienna International Centre (Building B) | | Vienna | 100.9 m (331 ft) | 27 | 1979 | | |
| 23 | Ares Tower | | Vienna | 100 m (328 ft) | 26 | 2001 | | |
| 23= | CGL Tower | | Vienna | 100 m (328 ft) | 34 | 2015 | | |
| 23= | Schneewittchen | | Vienna | 100 m (328 ft) | 30 | 2024 | | |
| 24 | Bruckner Tower | | Linz | 99 m (325 ft) | 31 | 2021 | Second tallest building in Linz | |
| 25 | Terminal Tower | | Linz | 98.5 m (323 ft) | 24 | 2008 | Used to be the tallest building in Linz till 2021 | |
| 26 | Wiener Stadtwerke Tower | | Vienna | 95 m (312 ft) | 24 | 2010 | Headquarters of Wien Energie | |
| 27 | Ringturm | | Vienna | 93 m (304 ft) | 23 | 1955 | | |
| 28 | Saturn Tower | | Vienna | 90 m (295 ft) | 20 | 2004 | | |
| 28= | Grünblick | | Vienna | 90 m (295 ft) | 27 | 2025 | | |
| 28= | Business Park Tower | | Vienna | 90 m (295 ft) | 22 | 2019 | Went through a major renovation that reshaped the entire building and changed its appearance drastically | |
| 28= | SEG Apartment Tower | | Vienna | 90 m (295 ft) | 25 | 1998 | | |
| 29 | ÖBB Tower | | Vienna | 88 m (289 ft) | 24 | 2014 | Headquarters of ÖBB (Austrian Federal Railways) | |
| 29= | The Icon Vienna | | Vienna | 88 m (289 ft) | 24 | 2019 | | |
| 30 | City Tower Vienna | | Vienna | 86 m (282 ft) | 24 | 2003 | | |
| 31 | Wohnpark Alterlaa (Block A) | | Vienna | 85,1 m (279 ft) | 27 | 1973 | | |
| 31= | Wohnpark Alterlaa (Block B) | | Vienna | 85,1 m (279 ft) | 27 | 1973 | | |
| 31= | Wohnpark Alterlaa (Block C) | | Vienna | 85,1 m (279 ft) | 27 | 1973 | | |
| 32 | Leopold Tower | | Vienna | 85 m (279 ft) | 26 | 2015 | | |
| 32= | Vienna General Hospital | | Vienna | 85 m (279 ft) | 25 | 1994 | Largest hospital in Austria | |
| 33 | HoHo Wien | | Vienna | 84 m (276 ft) | 27 | 2020 | Third-tallest timber high-rise in the world | |
| 34 | Wohnturm Höchstädtplatz | | Vienna | 83.5 m (274 ft) | 27 | 2006 | | |
| 35 | Mischek-Coop-Tower | | Vienna | 83 m (272 ft) | 27 | 2004 | | |
| 36 | Lentia 2000 | | Linz | 80,9 m (265 ft) | 21 | 1977 | | |
| 37 | UNIQA Tower | | Vienna | 80,7 m (264 ft) | 25 | 2005 | | |
| 38 | Hoch Zwei | | Vienna | 80 m (262 ft) | 23 | 2008 | Headquarters of OMV | |
| 38= | Momento | | Vienna | 80 m (262 ft) | 22 | 2025 | | |
| 38= | Porr Hochhaus | | Vienna | 80 m (262 ft) | 22 | 1999 | Headquarters of Porr | |
| 38= | Obelixturm | | Vienna | 80 m (262 ft) | 22 | 1998 | | |
| 38= | Lux Tower | | Linz | 80 m (262 ft) | 21 | 2019 | | |
| 38= | Happy | | Vienna | 80 m (262 ft) | 26 | 2024 | | |

== See also ==
- List of tallest buildings in Vienna
- List of tallest structures in Austria
