= Austro Tower =

Skyscraper in Vienna, Austria

- Austro Turm (German)
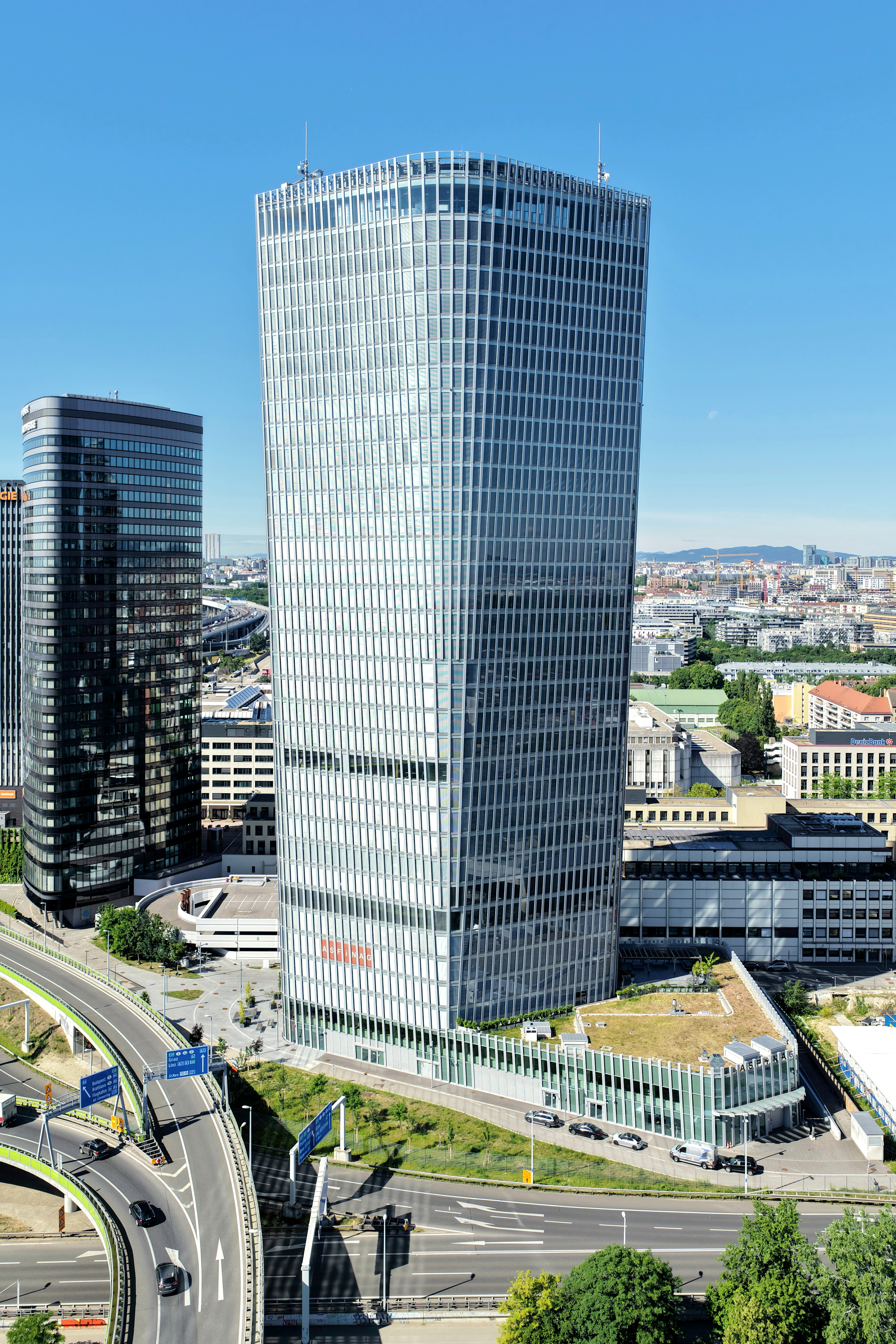

General information
- Status: Completed
- Type: Office
- Location: Vienna, Austria, 17 Schnirchgasse, Vienna, Austria
- Coordinates: 48.19361°N 16.41303°E
- Construction started: 2018
- Completed: 2021
- Owner: Deka Inmobilien

Height
- Roof: 136.6 m (448 ft)

Technical details
- Structural system: Reinforced concrete
- Floor count: 36 (+4 underground)
- Floor area: 43,400 m^{2} (467,000 sq ft)
- Lifts/elevators: 11 (Schindler)

Design and construction
- Architects: ATP architects engineers AZPML; SHARE Architects
- Structural engineer: Gmeiner Haferl Zivilingenieure ZT; Doka GmbH (framework)
- Main contractor: Swietelsky AG

The Austro Tower (German: Austro Turm) is a high-rise office building in the Landstraße district of Vienna, Austria. Built between 2018 and 2021, the tower stands at 136.6 m (448 ft) with 36 floors and is the current 9th tallest building in Austria.

== History ==
=== Architecture ===
The building, which was constructed between 2018 and 2021, is one of the tallest structures in Vienna and Austria with a height of around 135 metres. It has a usable area of 32,000 m^{2} (344,000 sq ft) spread over 38 floors and eleven elevators. The windows of the double-shell facade can be opened.

In May 2020, the tower was sold to the German Deka Immobilien Investment GmbH. The ground floor houses a conference center and a restaurant.

The project was built by the real estate company Soravia and, in the form of a general contractor, the Upper Austrian construction company Swietelsky. The construction costs amounted to around 120 million euros.

The project benefits from transport connections to the city center and the airport - and, on the other hand, from the panorama: from above, the new district next to the Danube Canal, between the TownTown business district and the new TrIIIple skyscraper complex. The building provides various sustainability facilities. At the same time, the impact on the environment and climate is reduced to a minimum, reason why the tower is subject to strict sustainability criteria. The building was designed to reach the highest standard both in the international LEED system and in the Austrian ÖGNI certification.

Regarding sustainability, the Austro Tower aligns every element toward renewable energy: heating and cooling are sourced from the Danube Canal, and component activation guarantees a comfortable atmosphere throughout all 38 floors.

== Gallery ==
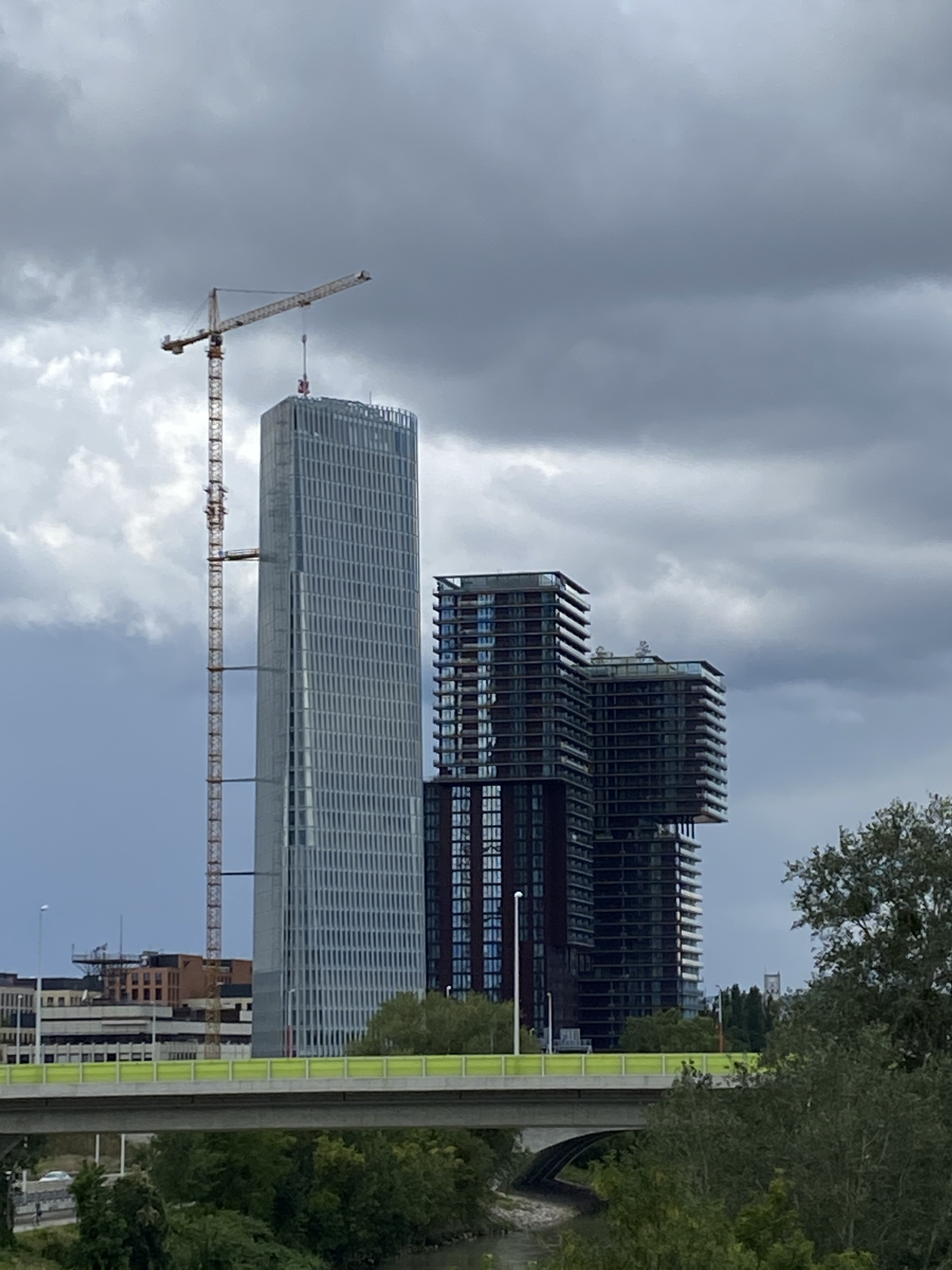
Construction progress of the Austro Tower in August 2021

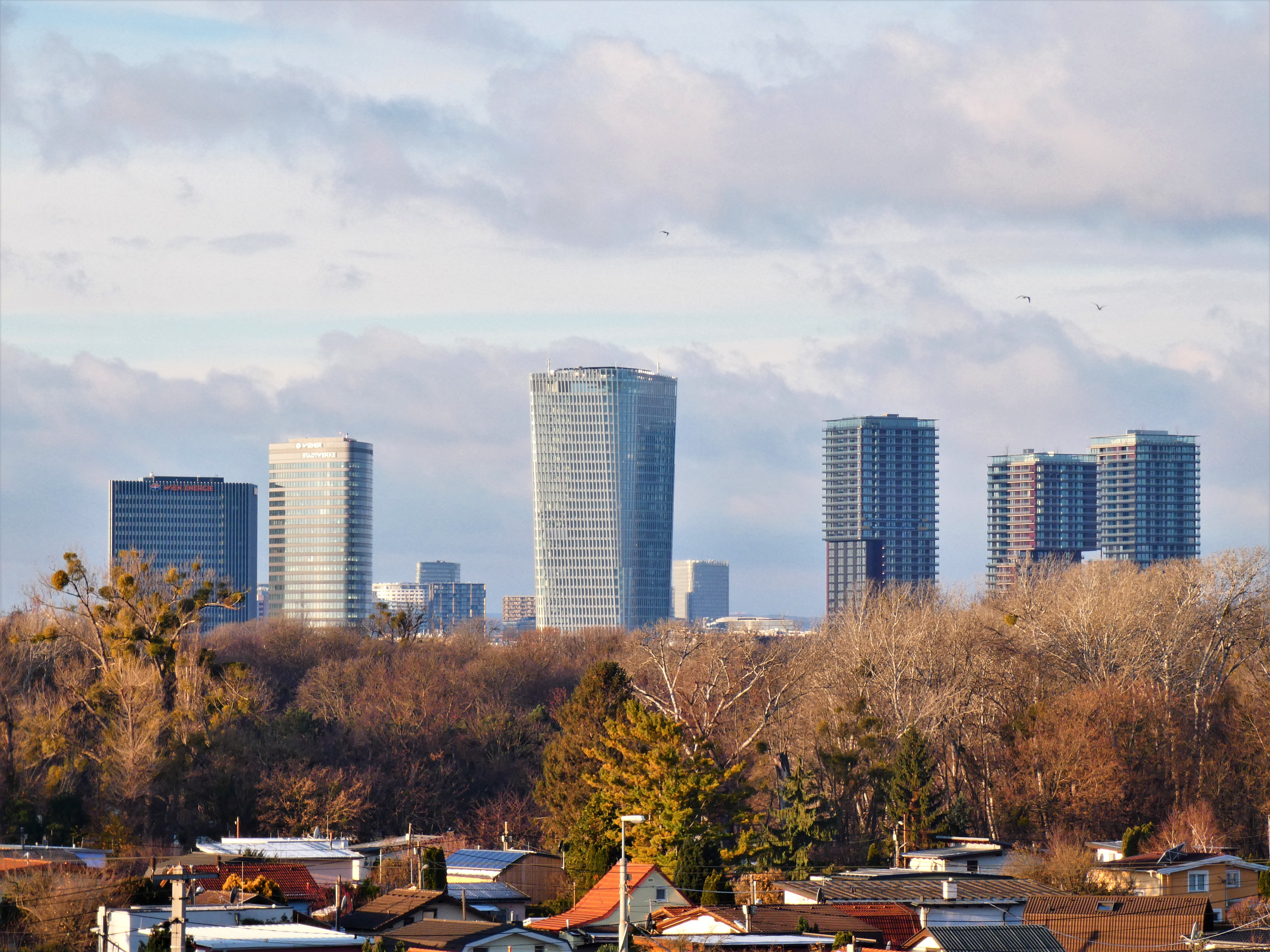
The Erdberg Ensemble seen from the Wien Praterkai railway station

== See also ==
- List of tallest buildings in Austria
- List of tallest buildings in Vienna
