= Mischek Tower =

Skyscraper in Vienna, Austria

- Mischek Turm (German)
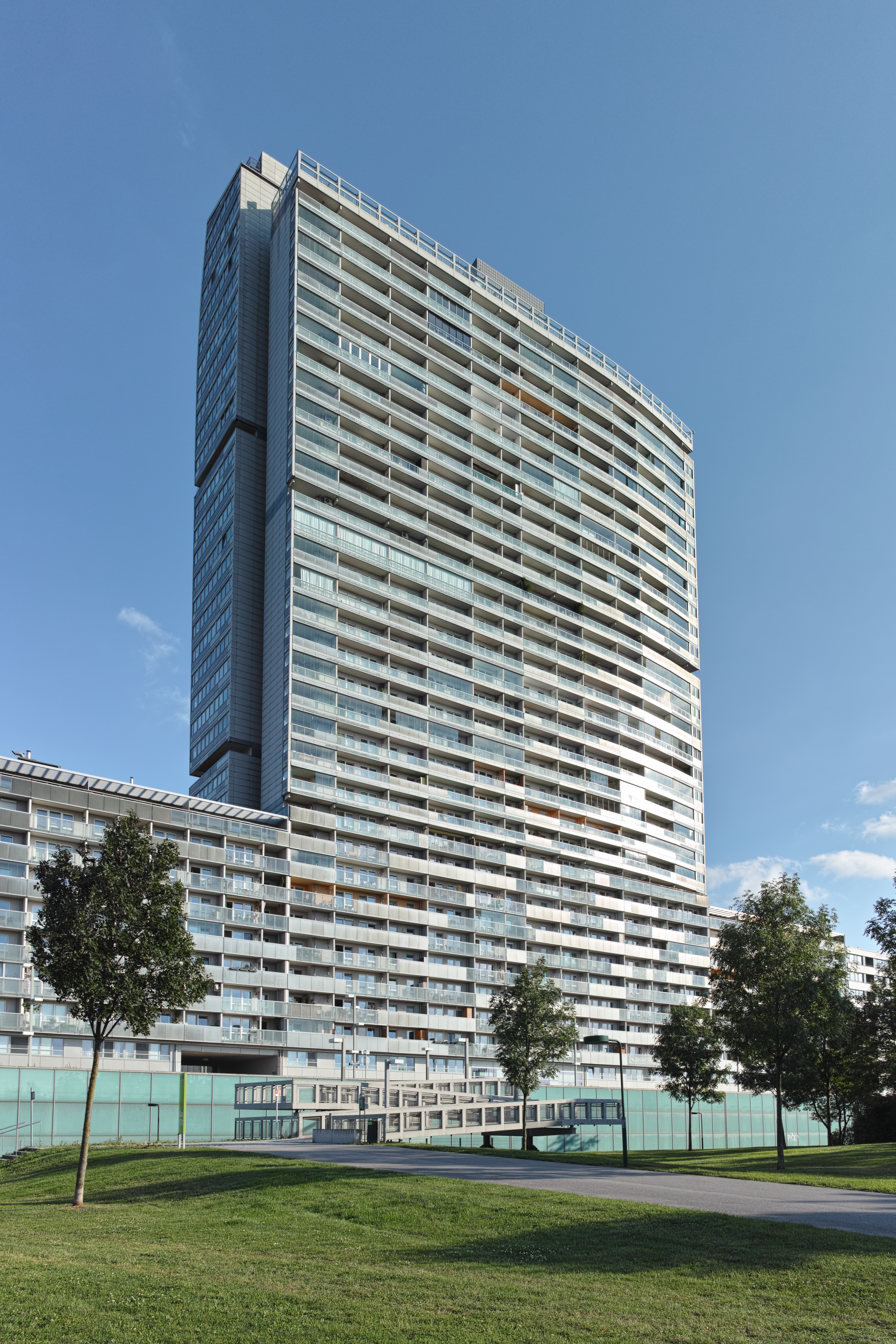
- Interactive map of the Mischek Tower area

General information
- Status: Completed
- Type: Residential
- Location: Vienna, Austria, 8 Leonard-Bernstein-Straße, Vienna, Austria
- Coordinates: 48.23695°N 16.41229°E
- Construction started: 1998
- Completed: 1999

Height
- Roof: 108 m (354 ft)

Technical details
- Structural system: Concrete
- Floor count: 36 (+4 underground)

Design and construction
- Architect: Delugan Meissl Associated Architects
- Structural engineer: Dr. Ronald Mischek
- Main contractor: Mischek AG

The Mischek Tower (German: Mischek Turm) is a high-rise residential building in the Donaustadt district of Vienna, Austria. Built between 1998 and 1999, the tower stands at 108 m (354 ft) with 36 floors and is the current 15th tallest building in Austria.

== History ==
=== Architecture ===
The building was constructed between 1998 and 1999 based on designs by the architect couple Delugan-Meissl by the construction company Mischek, which acted as general contractor, on behalf of the property developer Wiener Heim. The 110-meter-high building was the tallest residential building in Austria until the opening of the Neue Donau high-rise in 2002. Built from precast concrete elements, the Mischek Tower with its 35 floors (from the Donauplatte level, the street level is on level −3) is considered the tallest prefabricated building in the world.

Located on the edge of Donau City between Donaupark and Austria Center Vienna, the bar-shaped building serves as a visual boundary between the city and the park. In addition to the actual high-rise, there are two further building sections, each with 9 floors. Towards the Danube, a residential building of the Donaucity residential park borders directly to the south of the Staircase 3 building section.

The building is owned by the buyers of the approximately 440 apartments, most of which are subsidized by the State of Vienna.

== Gallery ==
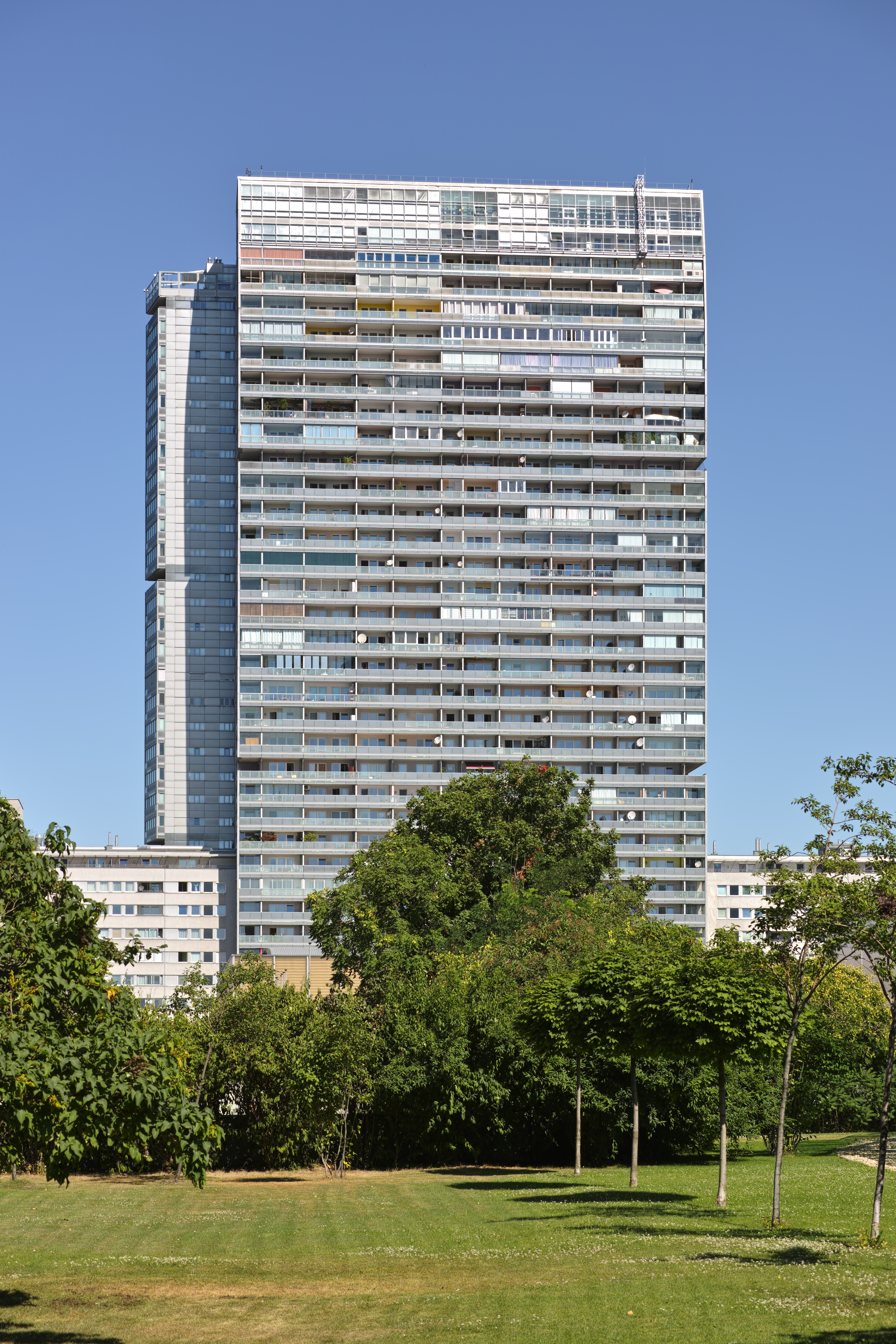
View from the south

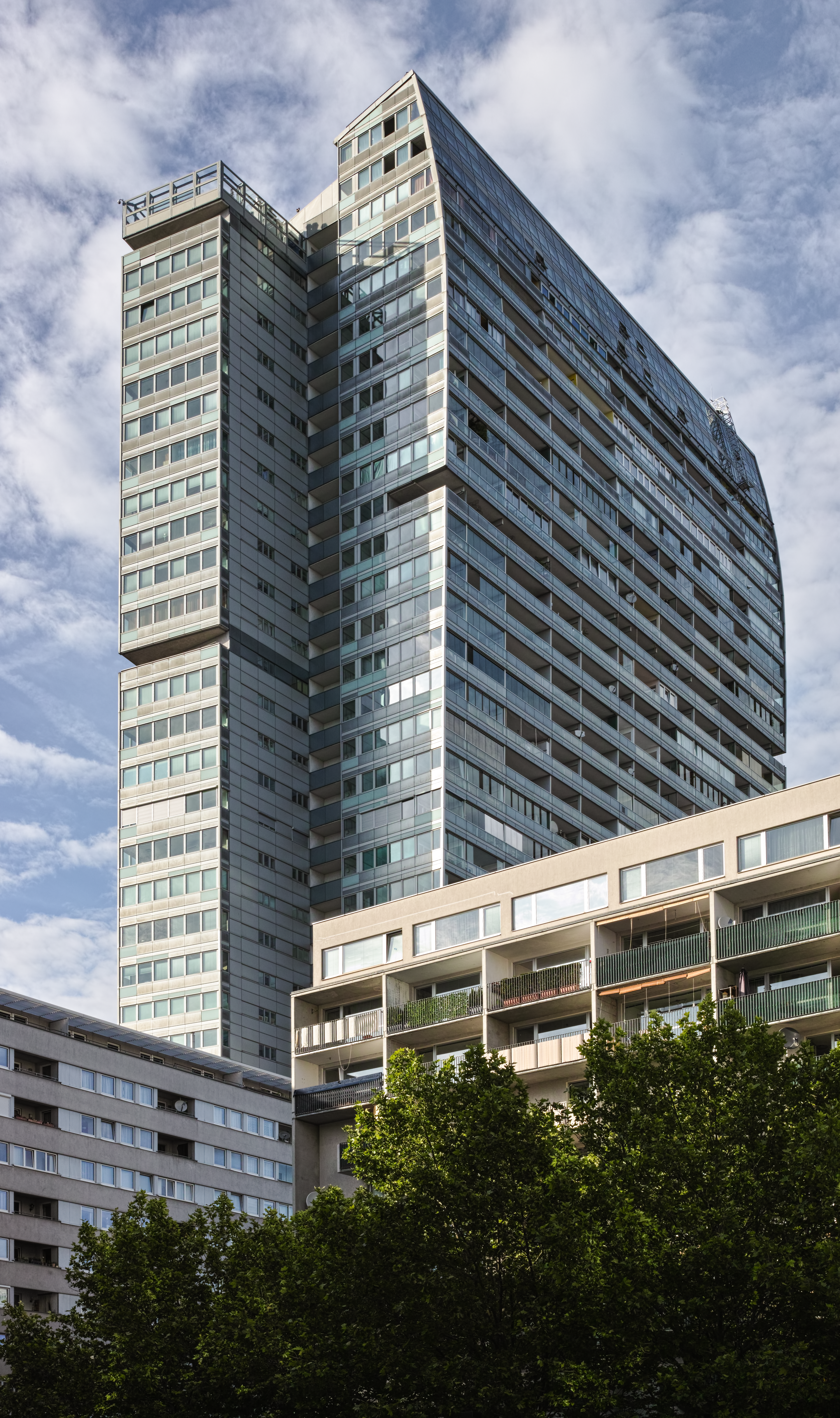
View from southeast

== See also ==
- List of tallest buildings in Austria
- List of tallest buildings in Vienna
