= Florido Tower =

Skyscraper in Vienna, Austria

- Florido Turm (German)
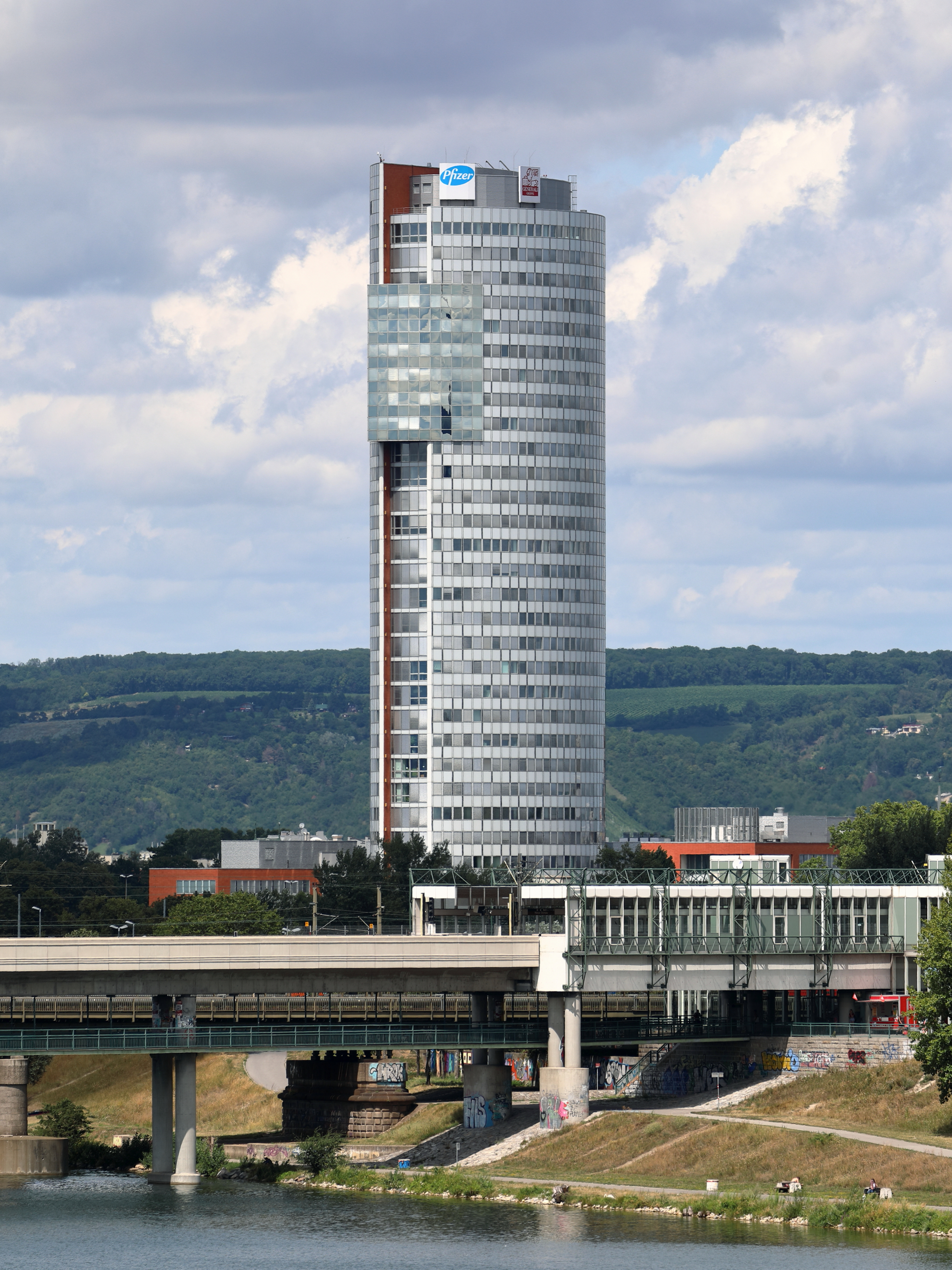
- Interactive map of the Florido Tower area

General information
- Status: Completed
- Type: Office
- Location: Vienna, Austria, Floridsdorfer Hauptstrasse 1, Vienna, Austria
- Coordinates: 48.25294°N 16.39231°E
- Construction started: 1999
- Completed: 2001

Height
- Roof: 113 m (371 ft)

Technical details
- Structural system: Reinforced concrete
- Floor count: 31
- Floor area: 36,000 m^{2} (388,000 sq ft)
- Lifts/elevators: 9

Design and construction
- Architect: Herbert Müller-Hartburg
- Main contractor: Porr

The Florido Tower (German: Florido Turm) also known as the Peak Vienna is a high-rise office building in the Floridsdorf district of Vienna, Austria. Built between 1999 and 2001, the tower stands at 113 m (371 ft) tall with 31 floors and is the current 13th tallest building in Austria.

== Architecture ==
The building, which was constructed in 2001 according to designs by the architect Andreas Müller-Hartburg, is one of the tallest buildings in Vienna with a height of 113 meters. It has a usable area of around 36,000 m^{2} (388,000 sq ft), spread over 31 floors, and 9 elevators. The office complex features the main 30-story skyscraper along with a ground floor and a technology floor, three flat structures containing four or five stories each, and a three-story parking garage. It has an energy-saving double-skin climate facade and opening windows, and cooling is achieved using chilled beams. At the end of 2006, the building was sold for 110 million euros to the German company DIFA Deutsche Immobilien Fonds AG, which now operates under the name Union Investment Real Estate AG. The Florido Lounge is located on the 30th floor and can be rented for conferences and events for 10 to 240 people.

In November 2020, the high-rise was renamed Peak Vienna. This involved the introduction of a new office concept and architectural changes such as open spaces, the use of natural materials and greenery.

The corridor varies in its materials from the original concept. Contemporary design, along with the intentional incorporation of reflections and light, gentle dark-hued natural components, and wooden features enhances the overall idea and provides the corridor with liniarity.

== Gallery ==
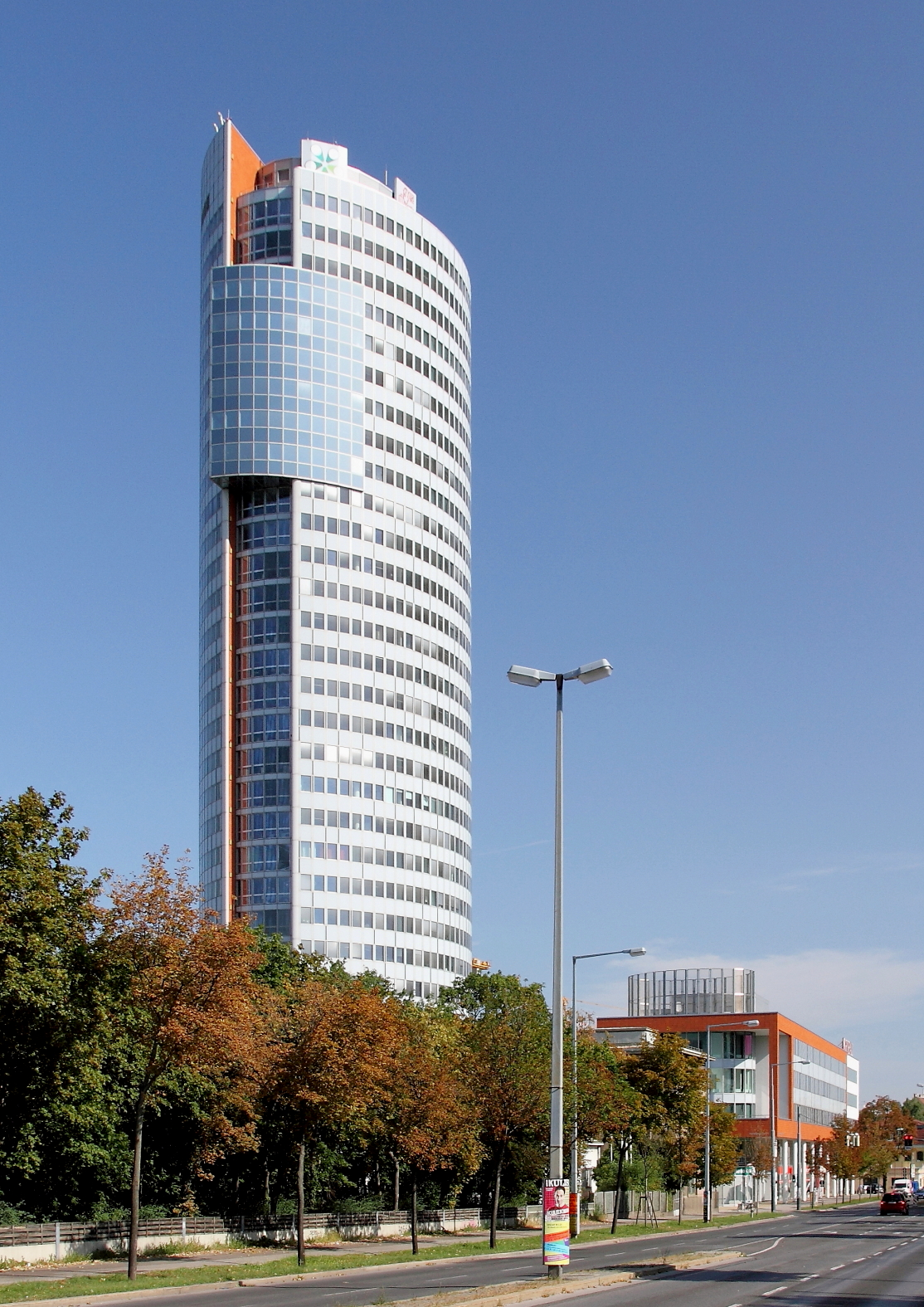
East view

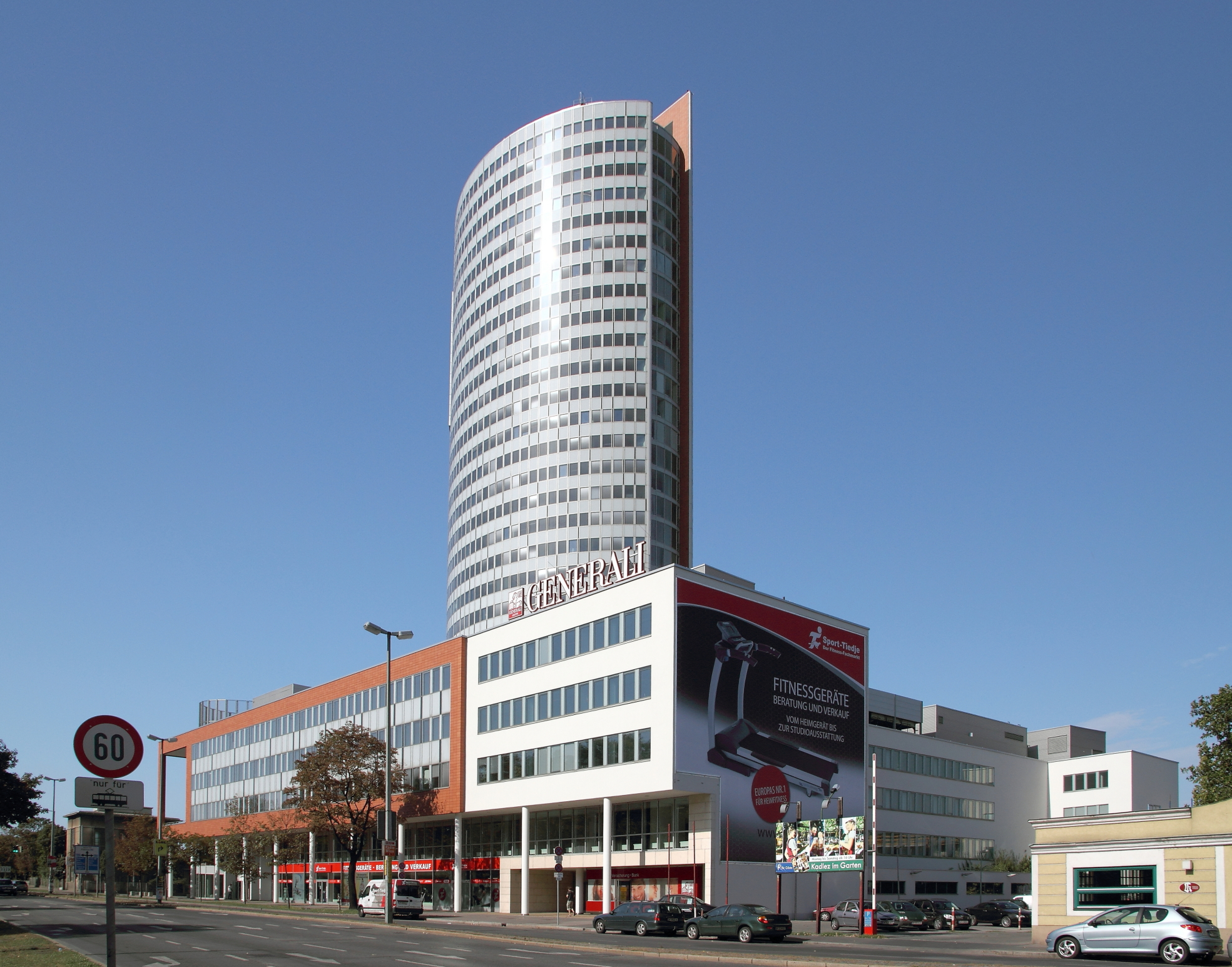
Southeast view

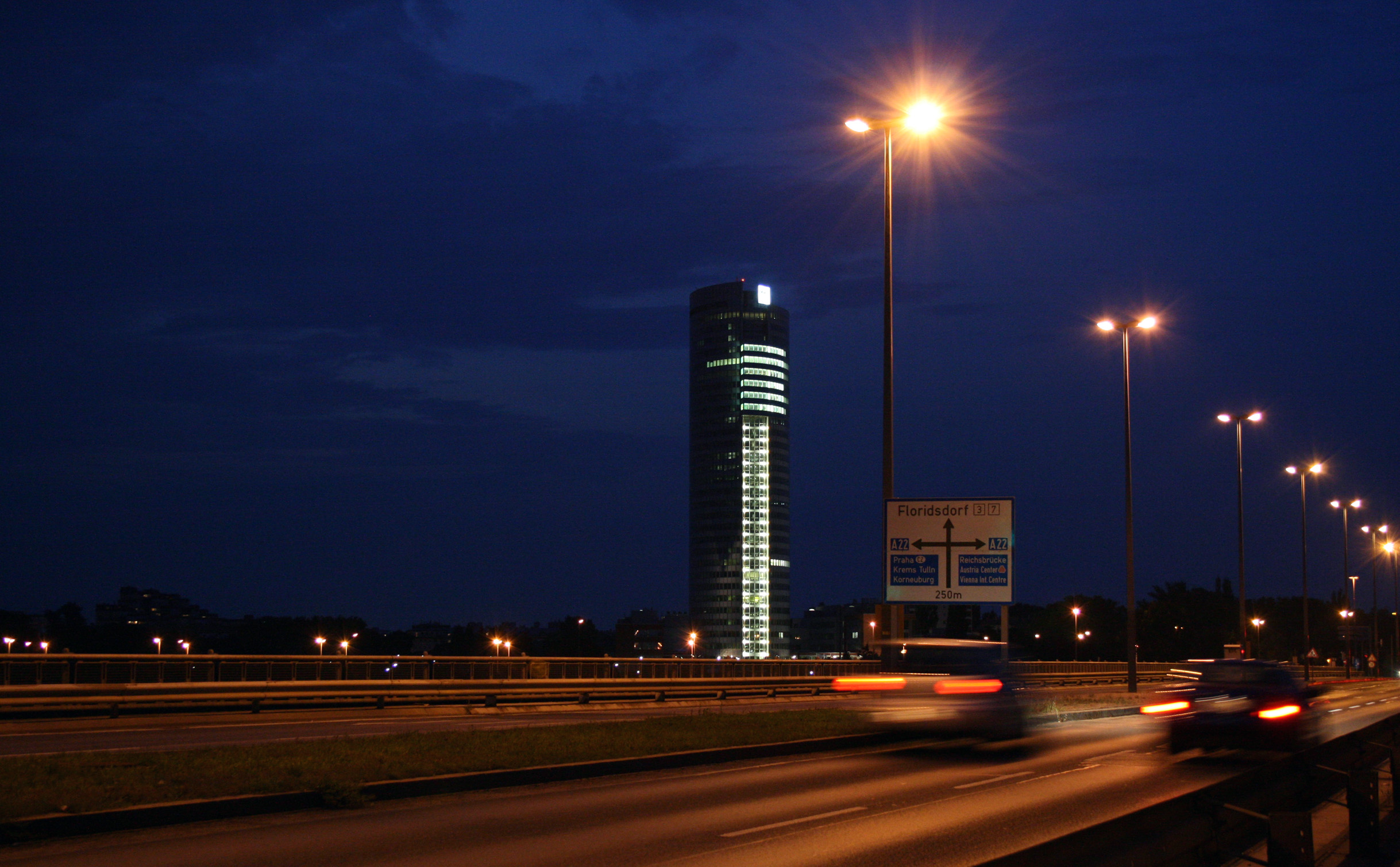
Southwest view (2008) at night

== See also ==
- List of tallest buildings in Austria
- List of tallest buildings in Vienna
