= Delugan Meissl Tower =

Skyscraper in Vienna, Austria

- Delugan Meissl Turm (German)
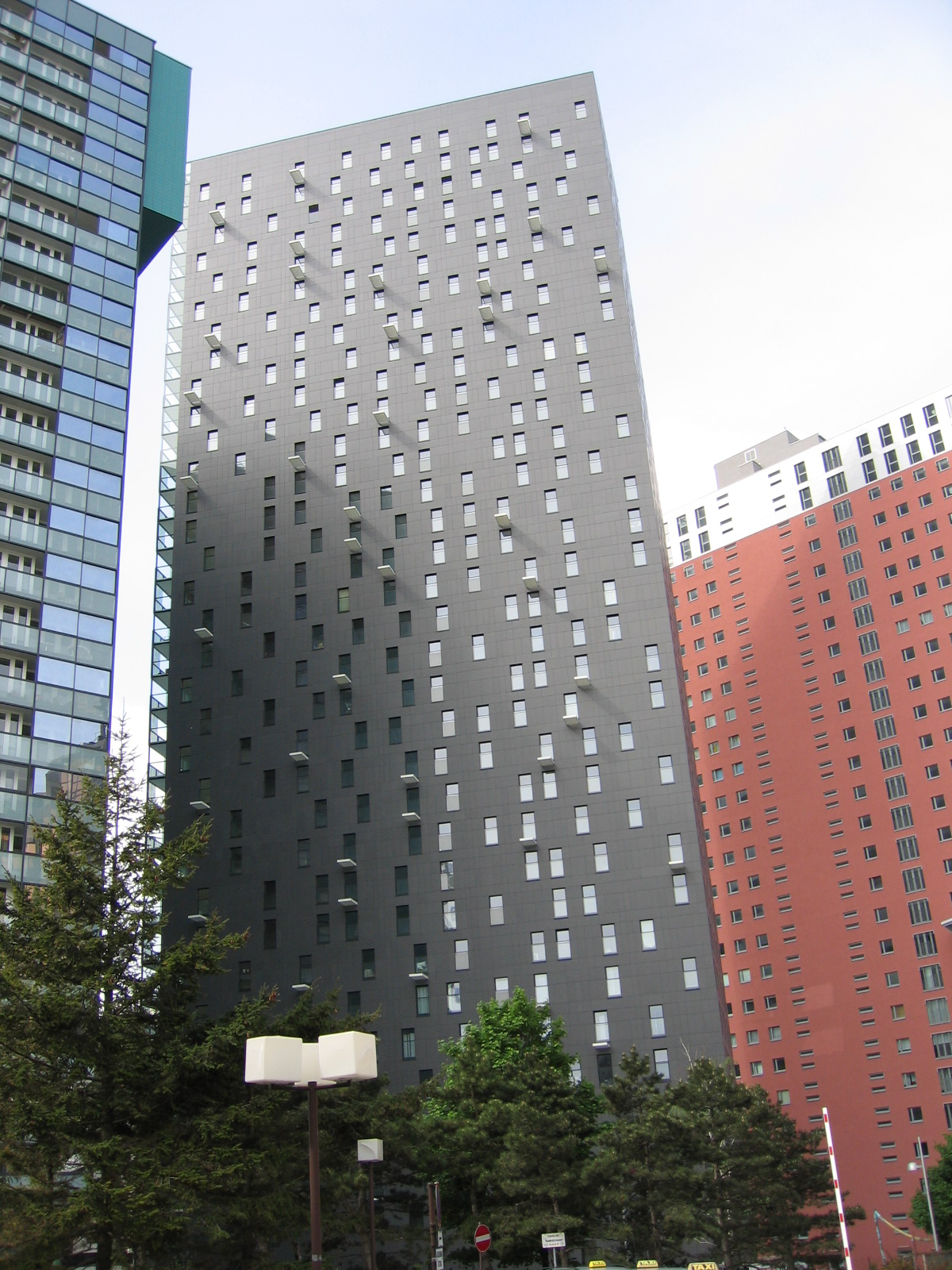
- Interactive map of the Delugan Meissl Tower area

General information
- Status: Completed
- Type: Residential
- Location: Vienna, Austria, 7 Carl Appel Straße, Vienna, Austria
- Coordinates: 48.16865°N 16.34395°E
- Construction started: 2003
- Completed: 2005

Height
- Roof: 108.5 m (356 ft)

Technical details
- Structural system: Concrete
- Floor count: 34
- Floor area: 23,300 m^{2} (251,000 sq ft)
- Lifts/elevators: Schindler

Design and construction
- Architect: Delugan Meissl Associated Architects
- Structural engineer: Dr. Ronald Mischek
- Main contractor: Mischek AG

The Delugan Meissl Tower (German: Delugan Meissl Turm) is a high-rise residential building in the Wienerberg district of Vienna, Austria. Built between 2003 and 2005, the tower stands at 108.5 m (356 ft) tall with 34 floors and is the current 18th tallest building in Austria.

== History ==
=== Architecture ===
The Delugan Meissl Tower is a residential high-rise on the ridge of the Wienerberg in the Austrian capital Vienna. It is located in the so-called Wienerberg City and has an official height of 108.5 meters. The tower is named after the Delugan Meissl architectural firm, which also designed it. The construction of the residential tower took two years (2003–2005) and since then it has been one of the tallest skyscrapers in Vienna. The usable area of the entire high-rise (23,300 m^{2} (251,000 sq ft)) is used for apartments, making it one of the largest residential complexes in the city.

== Gallery ==
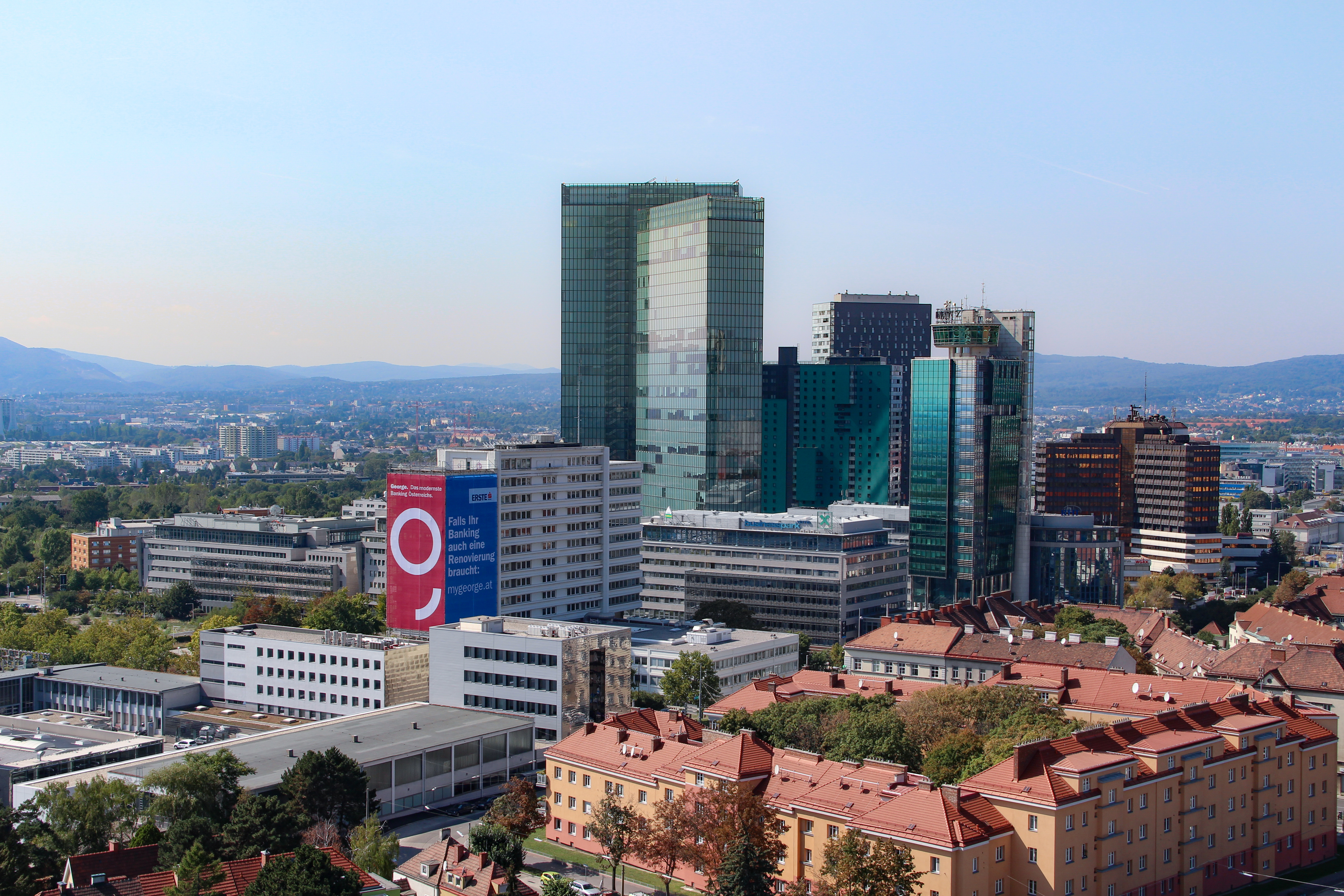
The Delugan Meissl Tower (second from right) in the Wienerberg City

== See also ==
- List of tallest buildings in Austria
- List of tallest buildings in Vienna
