= Hochhaus Neue Donau =

Skyscraper in Vienna, Austria

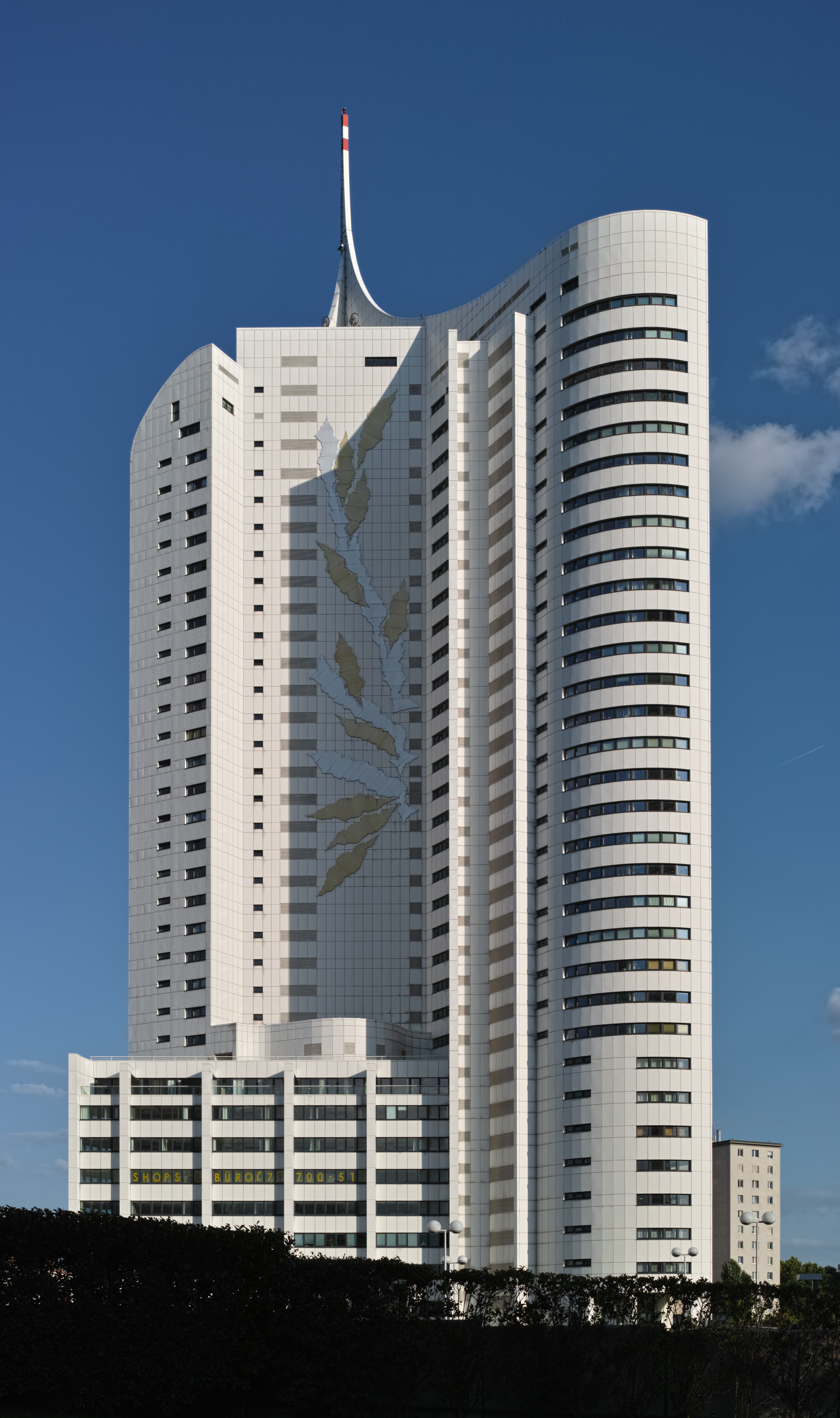
- Interactive map of the Hochhaus Neue Donau area

General information
- Status: Completed
- Type: Mixed-use: Residential / Office
- Location: Vienna, Austria, 4 Wagramer Str., Vienna, Austria
- Coordinates: 48.23075°N 16.41574°E
- Construction started: 1999
- Completed: 2001

Height
- Antenna spire: 150 m (490 ft)
- Roof: 120 m (390 ft)

Technical details
- Structural system: Concrete
- Floor count: 34
- Lifts/elevators: Otis Worldwide

Design and construction
- Architect: Harry Seidler
- Developer: ARWAG Holding AG

Hochhaus Neue Donau also known as the Seidler Tower is a residential skyscraper in the Donau City district of Vienna, Austria. Built between 1999 and 2001, the tower stands at 150 m (490 ft) tall with 34 floors and is currently the 3rd tallest building in Austria.

== History ==
=== Architecture ===
The elongated triangular design of the 34-story tower is inspired by the goal of maximizing beautiful water views for every apartment. The longer wing is oriented southward toward the Danube, while the shorter wing points east, towards the Kaiserwasser and the Alte Donau.

The building, designed by the Austrian-Australian architect Harry Seidler, was constructed between 1999 and 2001 and has a total of 34 residential floors and one service floor, reaching a height of 150 metres. The ground floor to the 8th floor mainly contains rental offices. Floors 8 to 15 are divided into two-to three-room apartments, above that there are one-to two-room apartments, and on the top floor there are penthouses. Two basement floors contain garages with a total of 220 parking spaces beneath the plaza.

The vertical core comprises elevators and utilities. It links the two wings with the tower’s additional 7-storey wing, designated for office use. The white aluminum cassette facade is segmented into four sections. These create a triangular center, which is surrounded by three wings. On the ground level, there's the porter's office, which is constantly staffed.

== Gallery ==
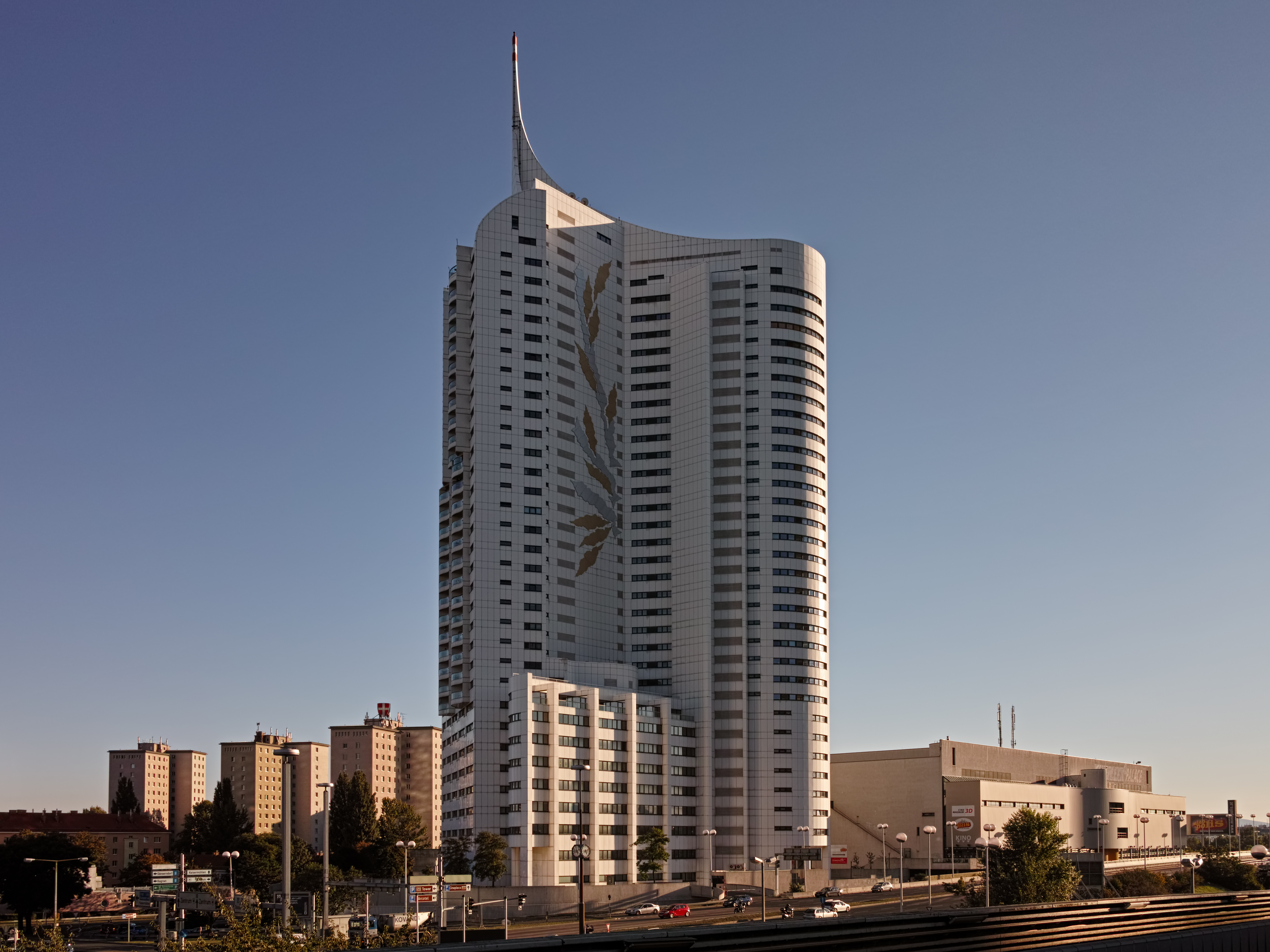
Neue Donau high-rise, view from the Kaisermühlen subway station

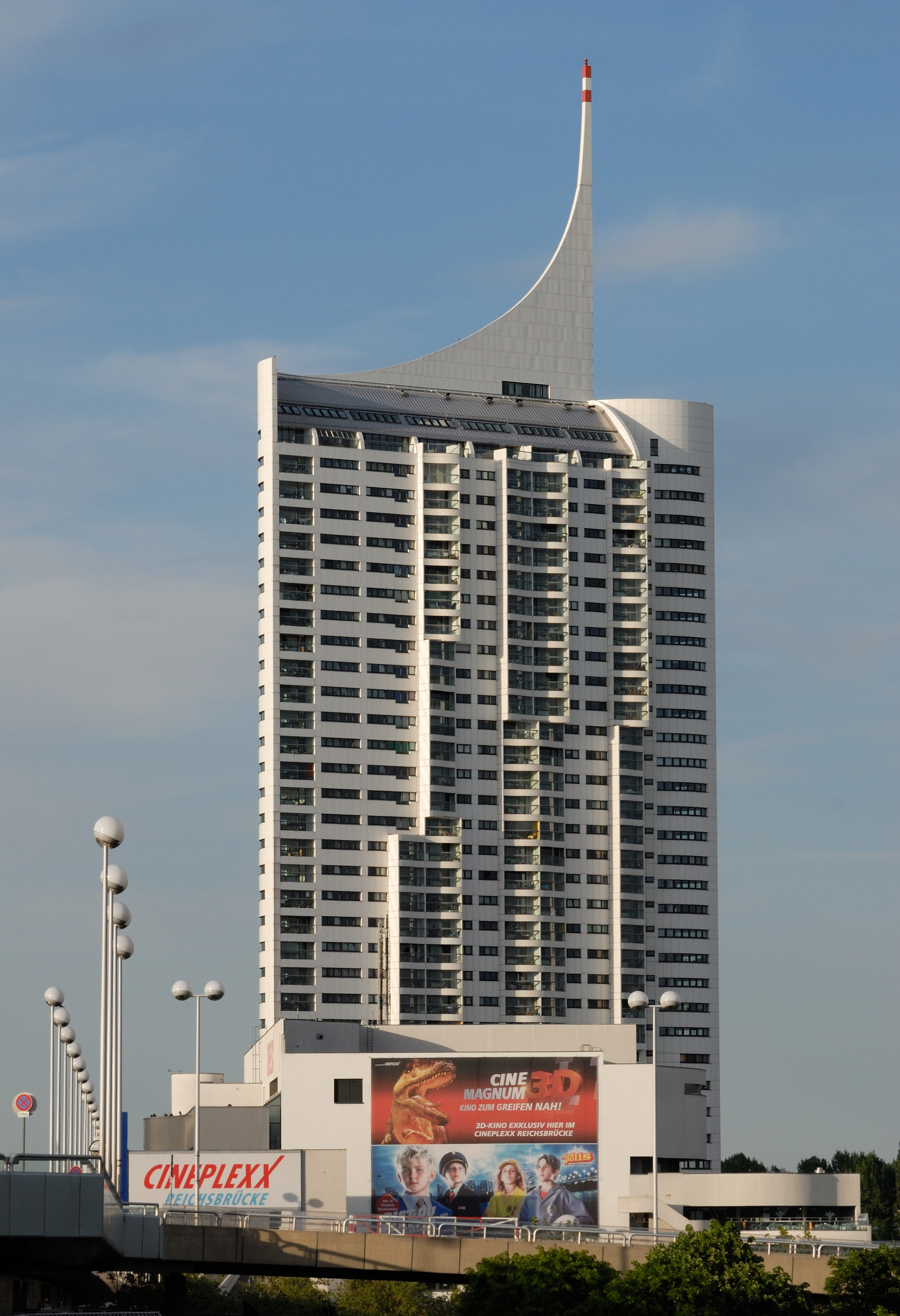
View from the southwest

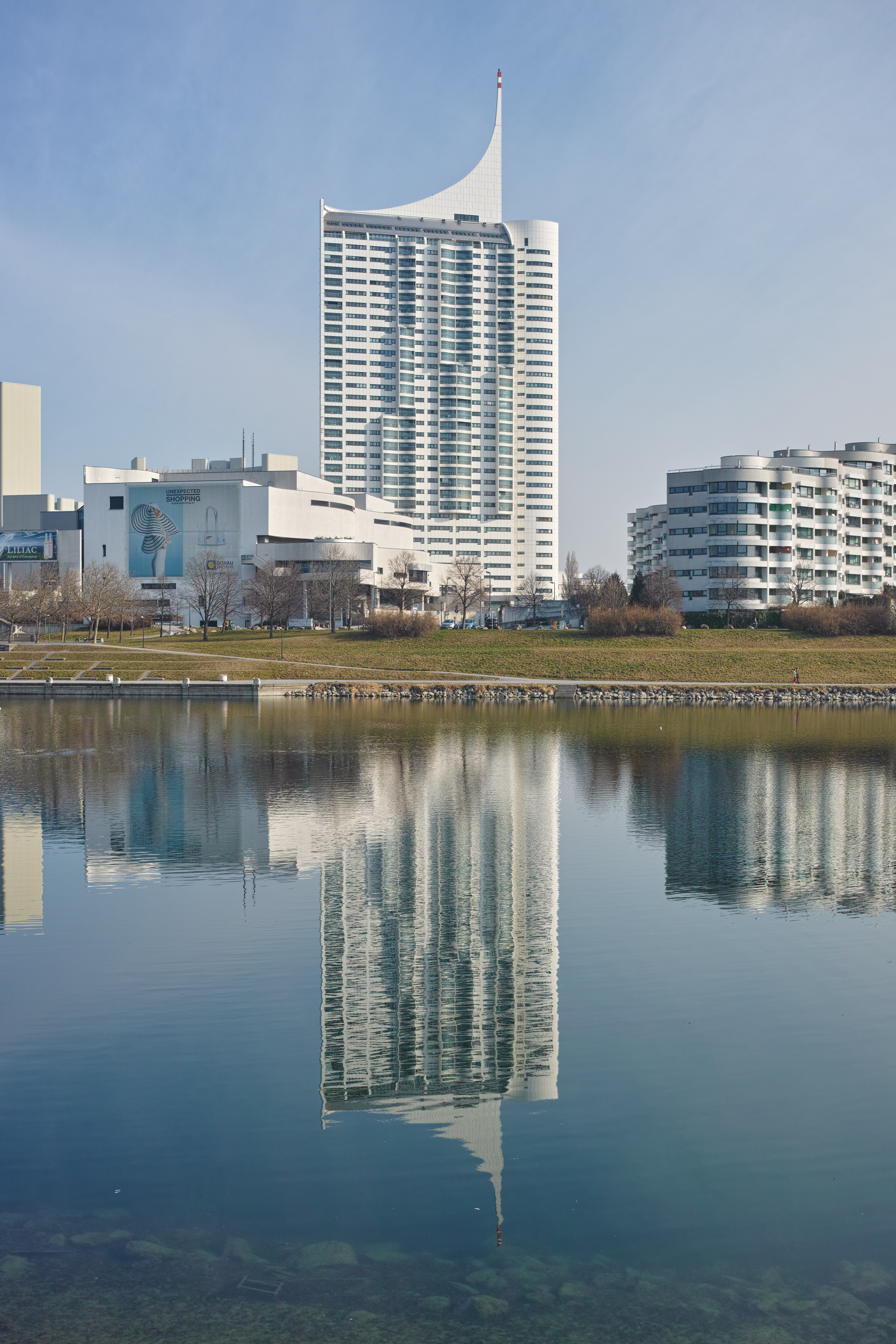
View from the southwest with reflection in the New Danube

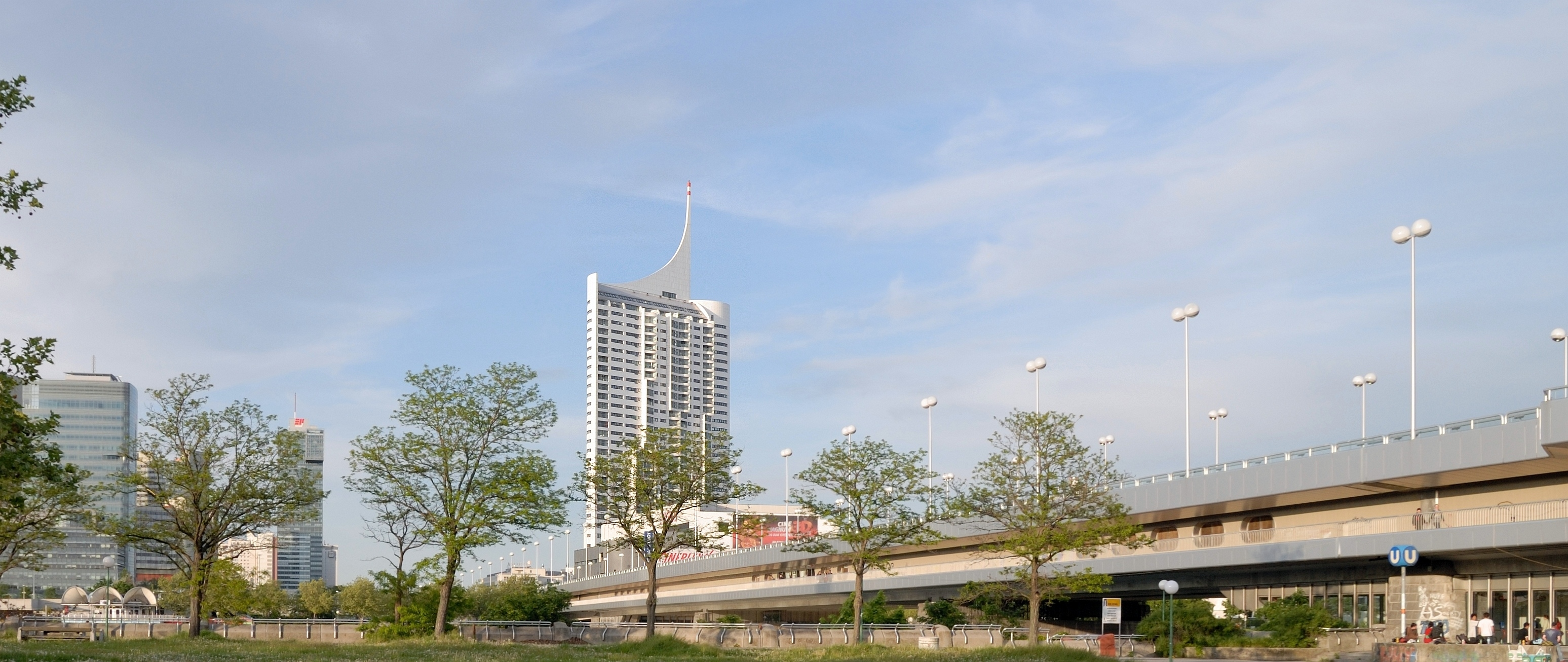
View from the Reichsbrücke

== See also ==
- List of tallest buildings in Austria
- List of tallest buildings in Vienna
