= List of tallest structures in Austria =

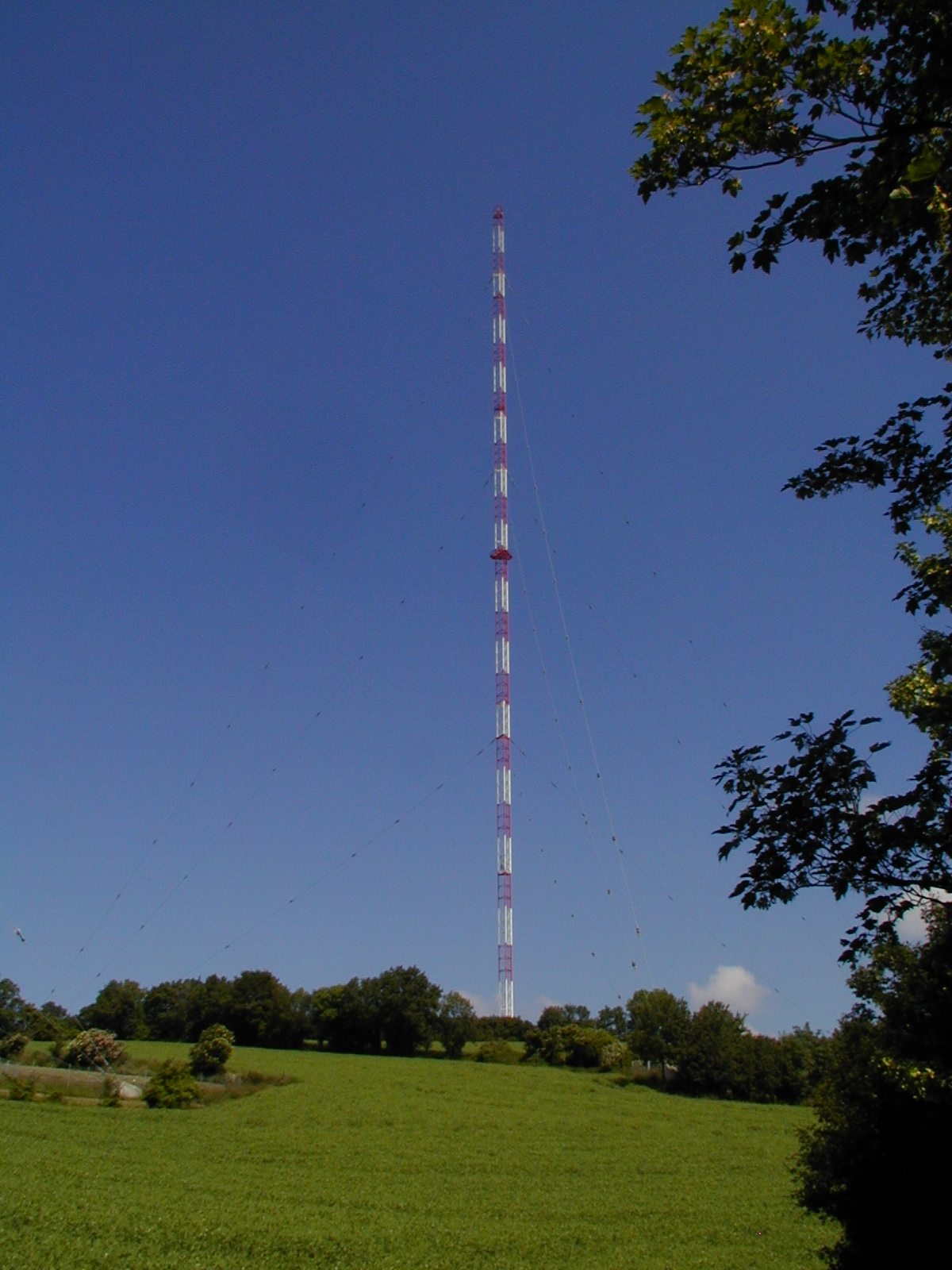
Nord mast of Sendeanlage Bisamberg, tallest structure in Austria until its demolition on February 24, 2010

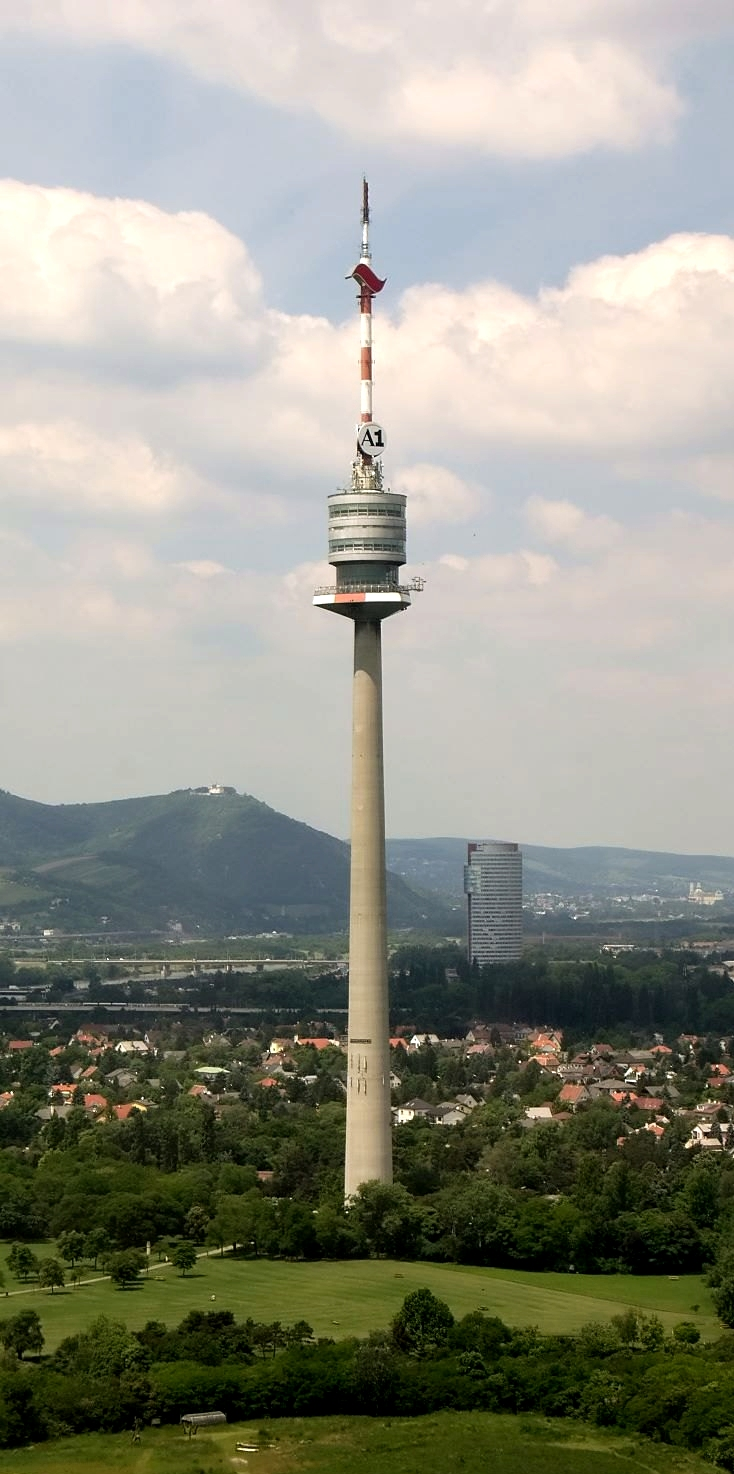
Donauturm, tallest freestanding structure in Austria

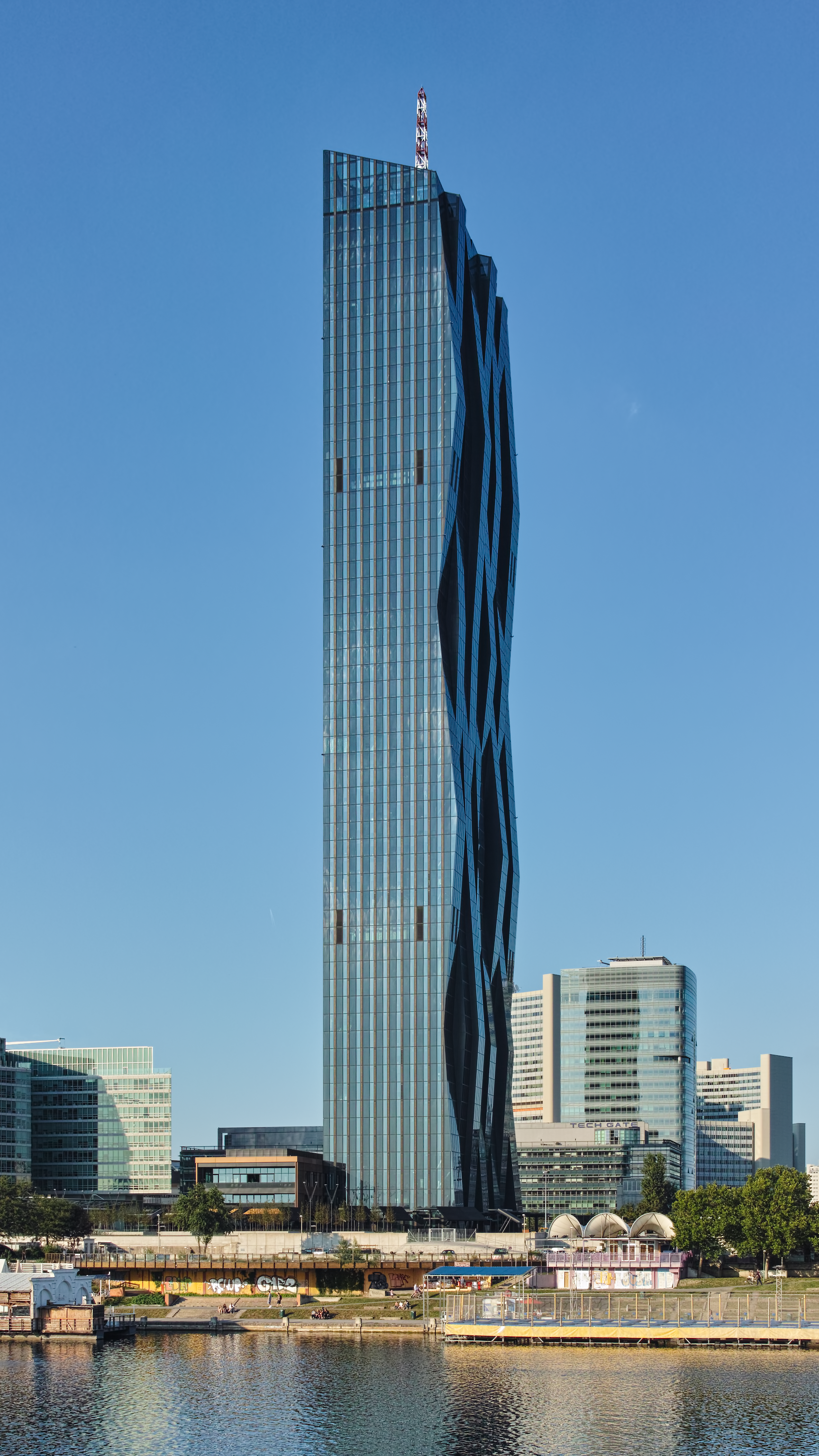
DC tower 1, tallest skyscraper in Austria

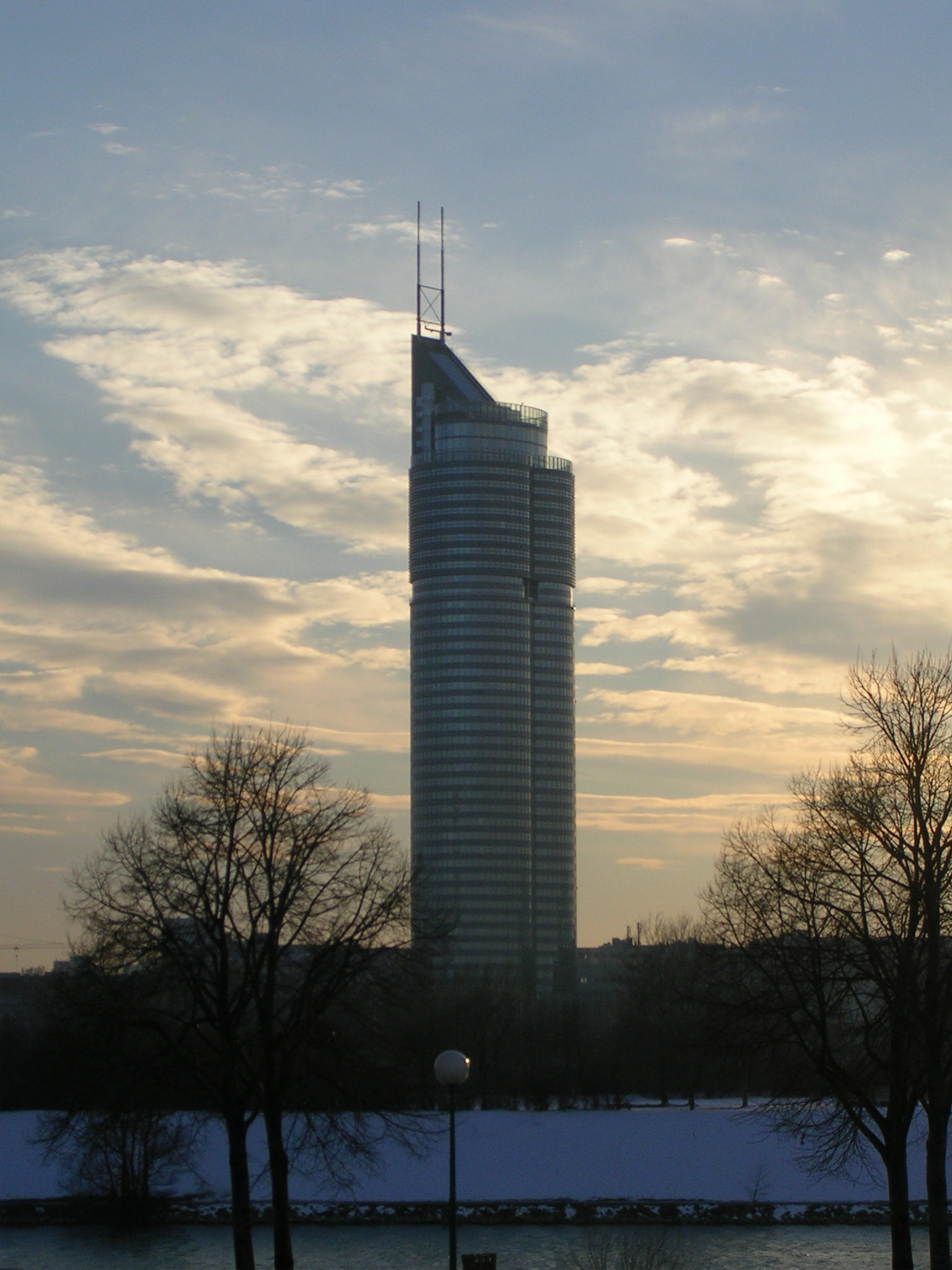
Millennium tower, 2nd tallest skyscraper in Austria

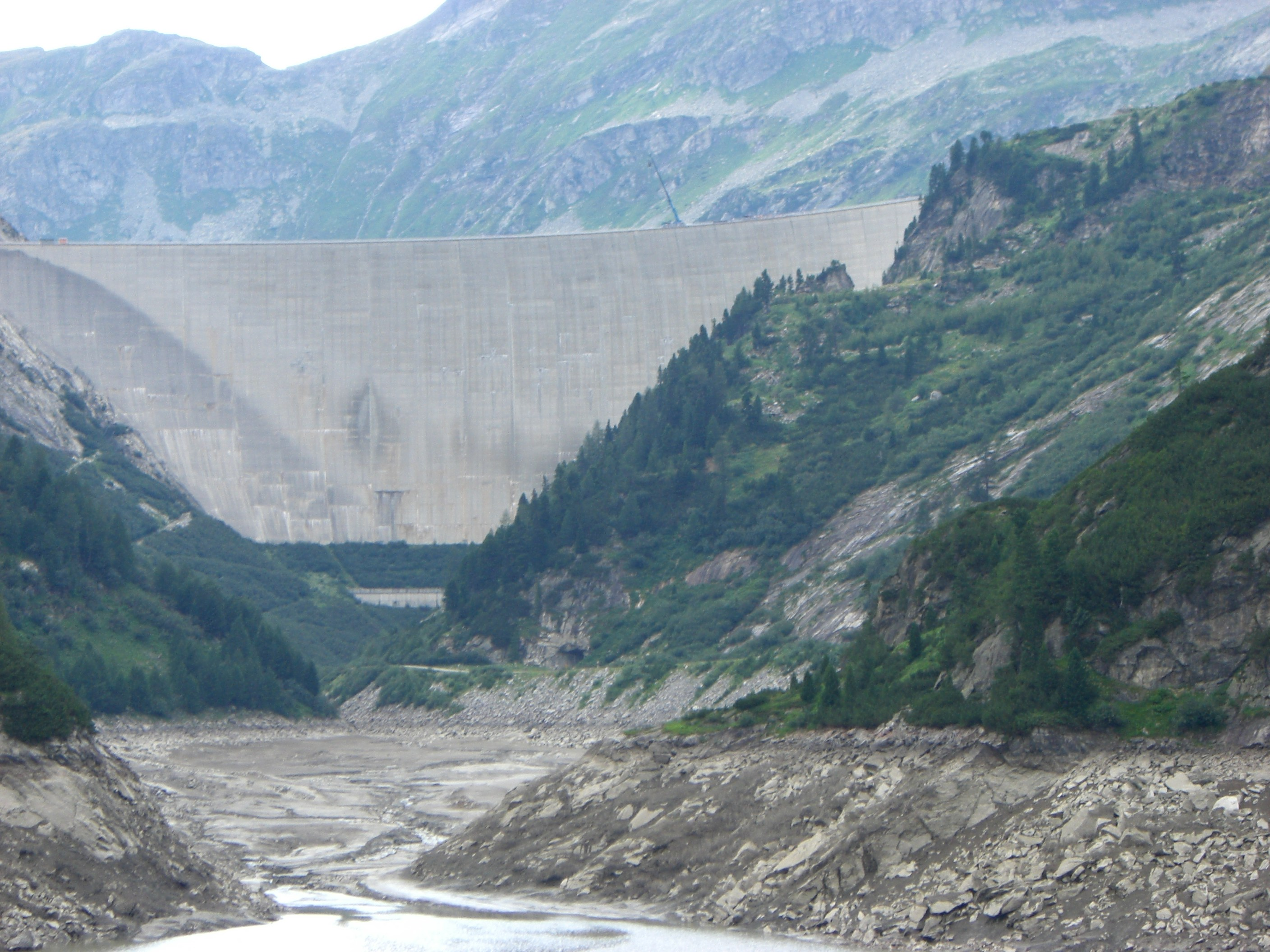
Kölnbrein dam, tallest dam in Austria

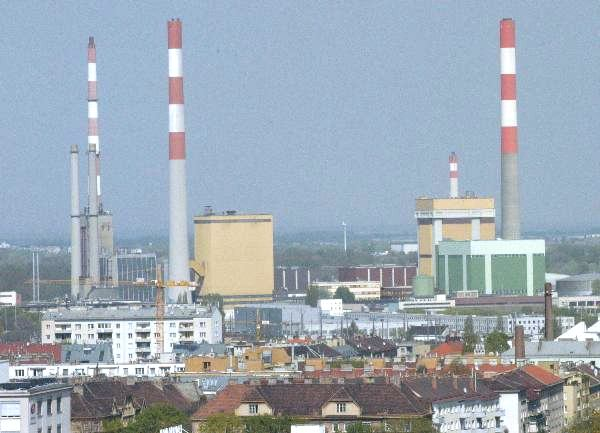
chimneys of Simmering power station

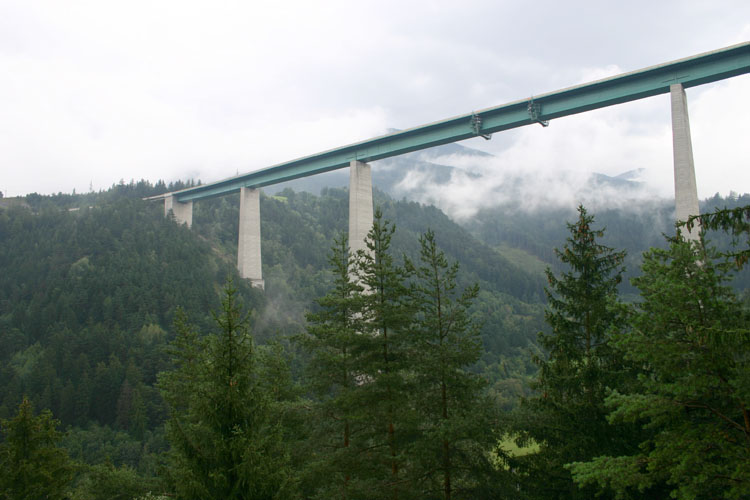
Pillars of Europabrücke

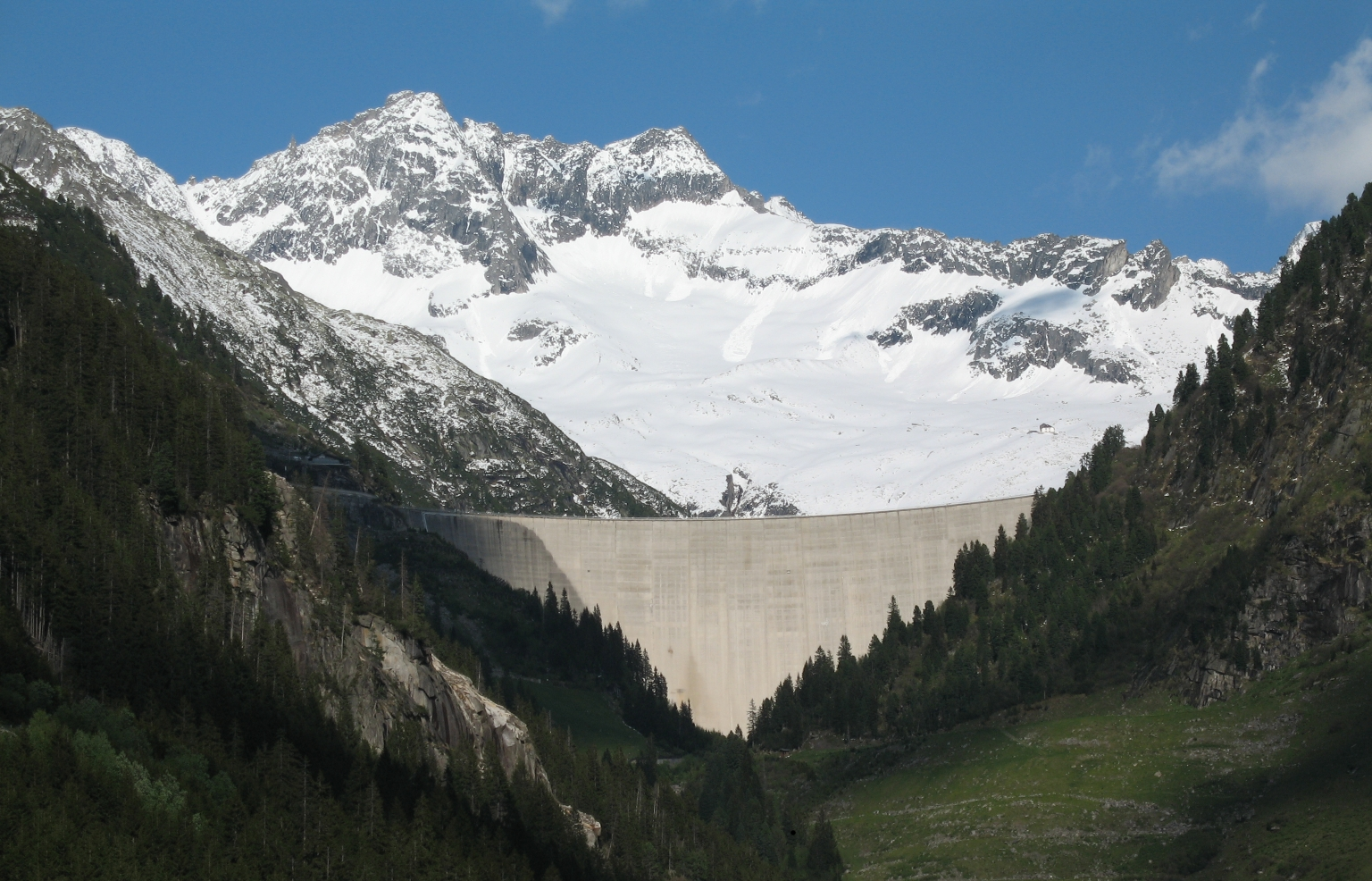
Zillergründl dam

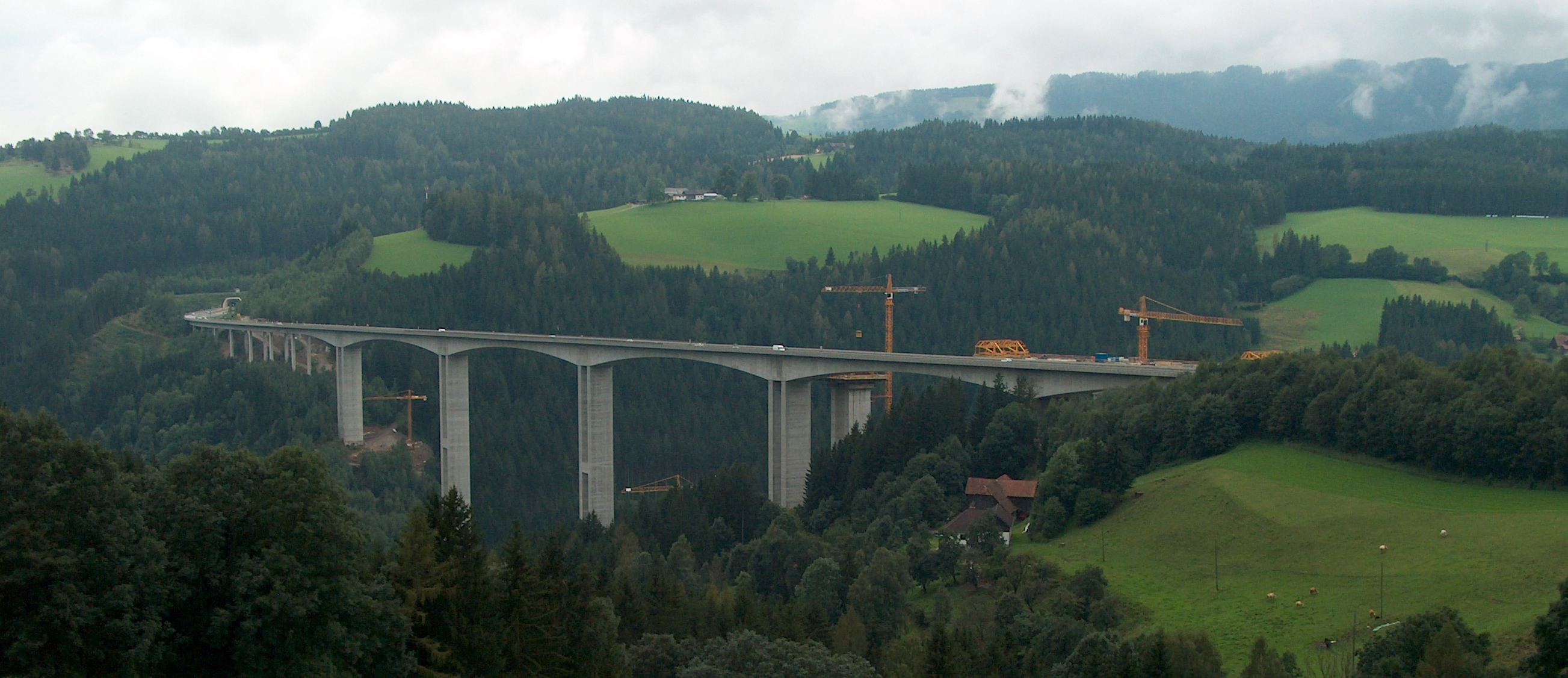
Lavant bridge

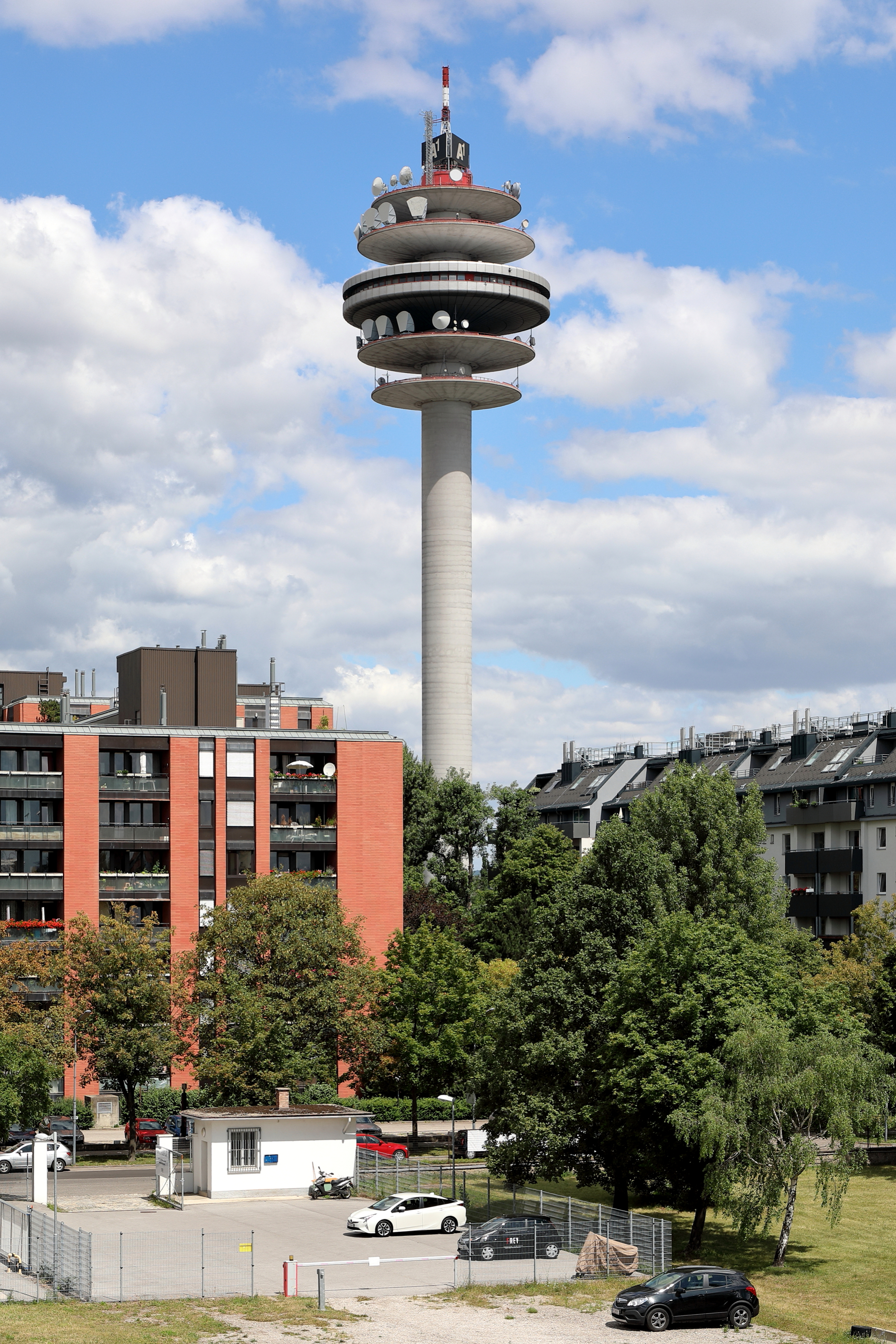
Funkturm Arsenal

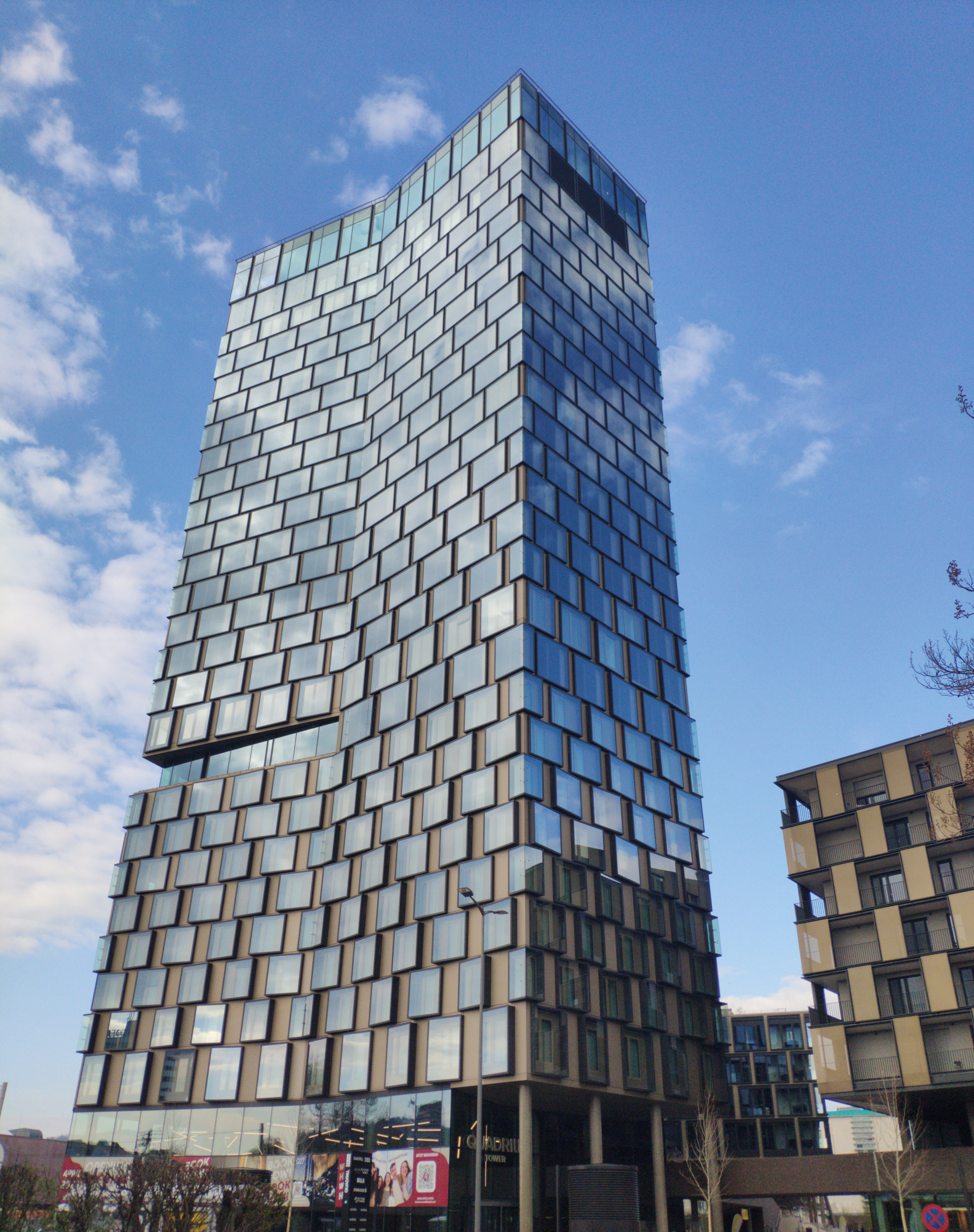
Quadrill tower (Linz), tallest skyscraper in Linz, Capital of Upper Austria and tallest one outside Vienna

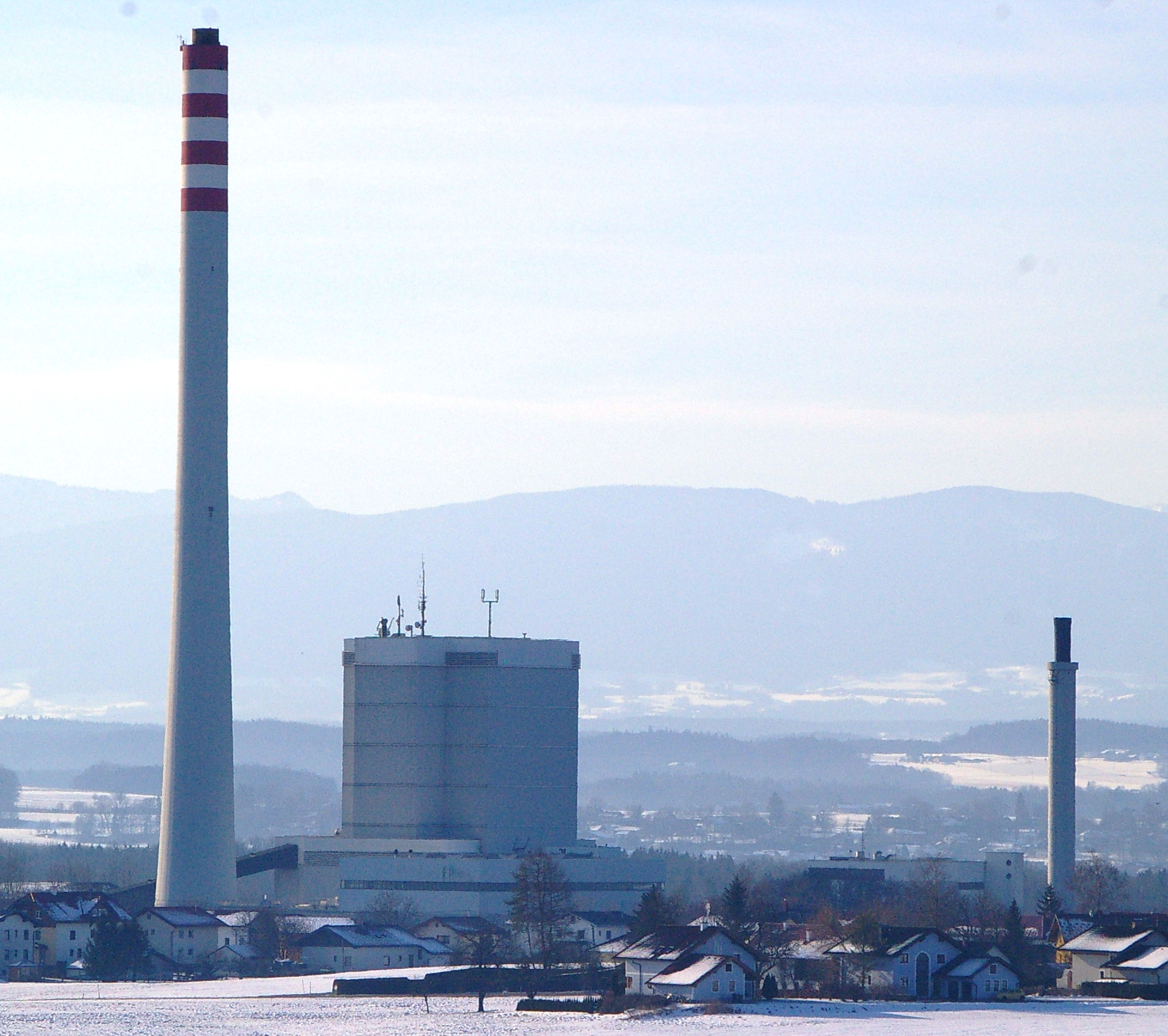
Kraftwerk Riedersbach

A list of tallest structures and buildings in Austria. The list contains all types of structures. Please expand and correct this list. The tallest buildings are listed in the List of tallest buildings in Austria.

Construction	Location	Height	Structural type	Coordinates
Donauturm	Vienna	252 m (827 ft)	concrete watchtower	48°14′24.83″N 16°24′36.22″E
DC Tower 1	Vienna	250 m (820 ft)	skyscraper	48°13′55″N 16°24′46″E
chimney of Dürnrohr power station	Dürnrohr	210 m (690 ft)	chimney	48°19′32″N 15°55′25″E
Millennium Tower	Vienna	202 m (663 ft)	skyscraper	48°14′23.52″N 16°23′13.87″E
Kölnbrein dam	Malta	200 m (660 ft)	dam	47°4′45.96″N 13°20′22.99″E
chimney of Simmering power station	Vienna	200 m (660 ft)	chimney	48°10′51.65″N 16°26′5.89″E; 48°10′54.89″N 16°25′54.99″E; 48°11′2.76″N 16°26′2.13″E
Europabrücke	Innsbruck	192 m (630 ft)	bridge	47°12′7.5″N 11°24′6.57″E
chimney of Riedersbach power station	Riedersbach	191 m (627 ft)	chimney	48°1′54.37″N 12°50′35.24″E
Zillergründl dam	Mayrhofen	186 m (610 ft)	dam	47°7′16.02″N 12°3′43.45″E
chimney of district heating plant Mitte Linz	Linz	183 m (600 ft)	chimney	48°17′59.2″N 14°19′24.65″E
Danube Flats	Vienna	182 m (597 ft)	skyscraper	
chimney of Mellach district heating plant	Fernitz Mellach	175 m (574 ft)	chimney	46°54′38.67″N 15°29′20.52″E
DC Tower 2	Vienna	175 m (574 ft)	skyscraper	
Sendeturm Dobratsch	Villach	165 m (541 ft)	tower, partially guyed	46°36′11.82″N 13°40′22.24″E
Kahlenberg transmitter	Vienna	165 m (541 ft)	guyed mast	48°16′35.08″N 16°20′0.22″E
Lavant bridge	Bezirk Wolfsberg	165 m (541 ft)	bridge	46°55′15.98″N 14°50′21.6″E
IZD Tower	Vienna - Donau City	162 m (531 ft)	skyscraper	48°14′5.54″N 16°25′16.27″E
chimney of Korneuburg power station	Korneuburg	160 m (520 ft)	chimney (about to be demolished soon)	48°19′54.94″N 16°20′23.26″E
Lenzing chimney	Lenzing	156 m (512 ft)	chimney	47°58′36.34″N 13°37′11.6″E
Dobl transmitter	Graz	156 m (512 ft)	guyed lattice tower, insulated against ground	46°56′59.94″N 15°22′47.87″E
Funkturm Arsenal	Vienna	155 m (509 ft)	concrete tower	48°10′54.51″N 16°23′27.04″E
Lichtenberg transmitter	Linz	155 m (509 ft)	guyed mast	48°23′4.89″N 14°15′16.51″E
VIENNA TWENTYTWO Tower Homes and Offices	Vienna	155 m (509 ft)	skyscraper	
Gepatschspeicher dam	Kaunertal	153 m (502 ft)	dam	46°57′29.23″N 10°44′20.41″E
Hochhaus Neue Donau	Vienna	150 m (490 ft)	skyscraper	48°13′50.94″N 16°24′55.07″E
chimney of Donaustadt power station	Vienna	150 m (490 ft)	chimney	48°11′54.39″N 16°27′46.12″E
Finstertal dam	Tyrol	149 m (489 ft)	dam	47°11′57.03″N 11°1′17.88″E
Freinberg transmitter	Linz	146 m (479 ft)	guyed mast	48°17′50.36″N 14°16′2.76″E
Sendeturm Jauerling	Jauerling	141 m (463 ft)	lattice tower, partially guyed	48°20′4.57″N 15°20′18.39″E
Marina Tower	Vienna	140 m (459 ft)	skyscraper	
Vienna Twin Towers (Tower A)	Vienna	138 m (453 ft)	skyscraper	48°10′4.58″N 16°20′42.51″E; 48°10′5.51″N 16°20′45.32″E
Stephansdom	Vienna	137 m (449 ft)	church	48°12′29.58″N 16°22′22.75″E
Austro Tower	Vienna	136.6 m (448 ft)	skyscraper	
New Cathedral, Linz	Linz	135 m (443 ft)	church	48°18′2.42″N 14°17′8.97″E
chimney of Theiss power station	Gedersdorf	135 m (443 ft)	chimney	48°23′37″N 15°42′33″E
chimney of Spittelau power station	Vienna	135 m (443 ft)	chimney	48°14′4.49″N 16°21′33.81″E
Linz VOEST-Sinter chimney	Linz	135 m (443 ft)	chimney	48°16′49.24″N 14°20′16.45″E
Schlegeisspeicher	Mayrhofen	131 m (430 ft)	dam	47°2′16.04″N 11°42′24.28″E
Wachberg transmitter	Weitra	130 m (430 ft)	partially guyed tower	48°39′9.11″N 14°48′48.24″E
The One	Vienna	128 m (420 ft)	skyscraper	
Vienna International Centre (Building A)	Vienna - Donau City	127 m (417 ft)	skyscraper	48°14′3.23″N 16°24′58.55″E
Vienna Twin Towers (Tower B)	Vienna	127 m (417 ft)	skyscraper	
chimney of Simmering power station	Vienna	121 m (397 ft)	chimney	48°11′1.07″N 16°25′59.18″E
TrIIIple Tower 3	Vienna	120.2 m (394 ft)	skyscraper	
chimney of Peisching Heating power Plant	Neunkirchen	120 m (390 ft)	chimney	47°43′31.97″N 16°06′22.26″E
chimney of Simmering power station	Vienna	120 m (390 ft)	chimney	48°10′59.89″N 16°25′58.4″E
Wasserfallboden dam	Kaprun	120 m (390 ft)	dam	47°11′47.64″N 12°43′08.83″E
Vienna International Centre	Vienna	120 m (390 ft)	highrise	48°14′5.95″N 16°25′08.91″E
Praterturm	Vienna	117 m (384 ft)	tower	48°12′52.29″N 16°24′4.69″E
TrIIIple Tower 1	Vienna	117 m (384 ft)	skyscraper	
Lauterach transmitter	Lauterach	116 m (381 ft)	guyed mast	47°26′55.07″N 9°42′6.93″E
Donawitz chimney	Donawitz	115 m (377 ft)	chimney	47°22′56.78″N 15°3′15.83″E
Linz VOEST-chimney	Linz	115 m (377 ft)	chimney	48°17′03.61″N 14°20′22.56″E
Q-Tower	Vienna	114 m (374 ft)	skyscraper	
Support pillar of Glacial Aerial Tramway Kaprun III	Kaprun	113.6 m (373 ft)	lattice tower (tallest aerial tramway support pillar)	47°11′58.62″N 12°41′16.96″E
Andromeda Tower	Vienna - Donau City	113 m (371 ft)	skyscraper	48°13′58.81″N 16°24′50.57″E
Florido Tower	Vienna	113 m (371 ft)	skyscraper	48°15′10.67″N 16°23′33.3″E
Mooserboden dam	Kaprun	112 m (367 ft)	dam	47°10′03.18″N 12°43′28.73″E
ORBI Tower	Vienna	111 m (364 ft)	skyscraper	
Herz-Jesu-Kirche	Graz	110 m (360 ft)	church	47°4′10.12″N 15°27′20.65″E
Zwentendorf Nuclear power Plant chimney	Zwentendorf	110 m (360 ft)	chimney	48°21′18″N 15°53′07″E
Sendeturm Fleckendorf	Ansfelden	110 m (360 ft)	lattice tower	48°11′47.92″N 14°18′18.29″E
VIENNA TWENTYTWO Living	Vienna	110 m (360 ft)	skyscraper	
Mischek Tower	Vienna - Donau City	110 m (360 ft)	skyscraper	48°14′8.73″N 16°24′43.21″E
Hoch 33	Vienna	110 m (360 ft)	skyscraper	
DC Tower 3	Vienna	110 m (360 ft)	skyscraper	
HELIO Tower	Vienna	110 m (360 ft)	skyscraper	
Exelberg Telecommunication tower	Vienna	109 m (358 ft)	telecommunication tower	48°14′55.6″N 16°14′38.85″E
Control tower of Vienna International Airport	Schwechat	109 m (358 ft)	airport tower	48°7′21.31″N 16°33′42.44″E
Quadrill-Tower	Linz	109 m (358 ft)	skyscraper	48°18′42.5″N 14°17′49.9″E
chimney Glanzstoffwerke Sankt Pölten	Sankt Pölten	108 m (354 ft)	chimney	48°12′56.89″N 15°38′11.53″E
Linz VOEST-Furnace	Linz	108 m (354 ft)	furnace	48°16′39″N 14°20′1.45″E
Delugan-Meissl-Tower	Vienna - Wienerberg	108 m (354 ft)	skyscraper	48°10′4.67″N 16°20′42.35″E
TrIIIple Tower 2	Vienna	108 m (354 ft)	skyscraper	
Arzl, transmission tower	Arzl	107 m (351 ft)	transmission tower	47°09′25.78″N 10°43′56.23″E
Moserboden dam	Kaprun	107 m (351 ft)	dam	47°10′3.05″N 12°43′29.08″E
Trieben RHI chimney	Trieben	105 m (344 ft)	chimney	47°29′17″N 14°29′28″E
Boiler Houses of Dürnrohr power station	Dürnrohr	105 m (344 ft)	Building	
Hochfilzen RHB chimney	Hochfilzen	105 m (344 ft)	chimney	47°28′5.99″N 16°37′53.85″E
Linz VOEST-Fume chimney	Linz	105 m (344 ft)	chimney	48°17′03.19″N 14°20′26.9″E
Linz VOEST-Boiler	Linz	105 m (344 ft)	building	48°17′03.14″N 14°20′17.28″E
Wiener Rathaus	Vienna	103.3 m (339 ft)	building	48°12′38.5″N 16°21′29.95″E
Kitzbüheler Horn transmitter	Kitzbühl	102 m (335 ft)	partially guyed concrete base mast	47°28′33.41″N 12°25′47.26″E
Linz VOEST-Gasometer	Linz	102 m (335 ft)	building	48°17′03.58″N 14°19′22.17″E
chimney of Flötzersteig Incinerating Plant	Vienna	101 m (331 ft)	chimney	48°12′24.18″N 16°17′21.85″E
Vienna International Centre (Building B)	Vienna	100.9 m (331 ft)	skyscraper	
Ares Tower	Vienna - Donau City	100 m (330 ft)	skyscraper	48°14′0.06″N 16°24′42.47″E
Sonnwendstein transmitter	Sonnwendstein	100 m (330 ft)	partially guyed steel tube tower	47°37′45.71″N 15°51′41.75″E
Hirschenstein transmitter	Hirschenstein	100 m (330 ft)	lattice tower	47°20′43.3″N 16°22′44.58″E
Schwechat oil refinery largest chimney	Schwechat	100 m (330 ft)	chimney	48°08′33.57″N 16°29′41.03″E
Bergern Danube powerline Crossing, tower South	Bergern	100 m (330 ft)	powerline crossing	48°13′11.52″N 15°15′24.83″E
Bergern Danube powerline Crossing, tower north	Bergern	100 m (330 ft)	powerline crossing	48°13′28.41″N 15°15′11.2″E
Gailitz chimney	Gailitz	100 m (330 ft)	chimney	46°33′19.67″N 13°41′43.95″E
Gaisberg transmitter	Salzburg	100 m (330 ft)	lattice tower	47°48′18.91″N 13°6′43.25″E
CGL Tower	Vienna	100 m (330 ft)	skyscraper	
Schneewittchen	Vienna	100 m (330 ft)	skyscraper	
Votiv church	Vienna	99m (325 ft)	neo-gothic, Christian church	48° 12′ 55.46″ N, 16° 21′ 31.09″ E
Bruckner Tower	Linz	99 m (325 ft)	skyscraper	
Terminal Tower	Linz	98.5 m (323 ft)	Skyscraper, highest skyscraper in Linz until the Quadrill-Tower topped out in 2024	48°17′24″N 14°17′25.9″E
Donaufelder Kirche	Vienna	96 m (315 ft)	church	
Schöckl transmitter	Schöckl	95 m (312 ft)	lattice tower, originally free-standing, now additionally guyed	47°11′57″N 15°27′47″E
Wiener Stadtwerke Tower	Vienna	95 m (312 ft)	skyscraper	
St. Jakob	Villach	94 m (308 ft)	church	
Ringturm	Vienna	93 m (304 ft)	skyscraper	
Pfarrkirche Klagenfurt-St. Egid	Klagenfurt	91.7 m (300 ft)	church	
Basilika von Mariazell	Mariazell	90 m (295 ft)	church	
Saturn Tower	Vienna	90 m (295 ft)	skyscraper	
Grünblick	Vienna	90 m (295 ft)	skyscraper	
Business Park Tower	Vienna	90 m (295 ft)	skyscraper	
SEG Apartment Tower	Vienna	90 m (295 ft)	skyscraper	

== Destroyed/demolished structures ==
Structure	Location	Height	Structure type
Radio Mast Kronstorf	Kronstorf	274 m (899 ft)	went into operation in 1952 and consisted of one 274-meter-tall guyed steel-lattice mast and two 137-meter-tall guyed steel-lattice masts, all of which were insulated from the ground, dismantled 1956
Nordmast Bisamberg	Bisamberg	265 m (869 ft)	guyed mast, insulated against ground, built in 1933, demolished in 2010
chimney of Fernitz Mellach power plant	Neudorf-Werndorf	175m (574 ft)	guyed chimney, built 1968, demolished in2017
Aldrans transmitter	Aldrans	151 m (495 ft)	2 guyed masts, insulated against ground
Radio Mast Deutsch-Altenburg	Bad Deutsch-Altenburg	150 m (490 ft)	guyed mast, built in 1917, demolished
Mannesmannturm Wien	Vienna	150m (492 ft)	lattice tower (demolished in 1987)
Radio Mast Kronstorf	Kronstorf	137 m (449 ft)	guyed mast, insulated against ground
Radio Mast Kronstorf	Kronstorf	137 m (449 ft)	guyed mast, insulated against ground
Blaw-Knox Masts Bisamberg	Bisamberg	130 m (430 ft)	two guyed masts of same height, built in 1933/34, demolished in 1945
Alter Sendemast Kahlenberg	Kahlenberg	129 m (423 ft)	guyed mast used for FM and TV transmission, built in 1959, 1974 demolished
Radio masts Klagenfurt-See	Klagenfurt	120 m (390 ft)	guyed mast, insulated against ground, built in 1954, demolished in 1984
Radio mast Lienz	Lienz	104 m (341 ft)	guyed mast, insulated against ground, built in 1958, shut down in 1984 (demolished?)
Südmast Bisamberg	Bisamberg	120 m (390 ft)	guyed mast, insulated against ground, built in 1933, demolished in 2010
Longwave Masts of Deutsch-Altenburg Radio station	Bad Deutsch-Altenburg	100 m (330 ft)	three guyed masts, built in 1953, demolished
