= Mannesmann Tower (Vienna) =

Building in Austria

Coordinates: 48°12′52″N 16°24′36″E

The Mannesmann Tower Vienna ( Mannesmann Tower, also called Messeturm ) was a 150 metres (490 ft) tall steel lattice tower with a triangular cross-section that was built in 1955 by the Mannesmann company on the exhibition grounds in Vienna.

The Mannesmann tower was a gift from the Düsseldorf-based Mannesmann AG to the Vienna Trade Fair and was realized under the direction of Josef Fröhlich. It was built from seamless tubular steel. The manufacture of seamless steel tubes by rolling was a process developed by Mannesmann in 1885 and the term Mannesmann tube was synonymous with seamless steel tubes for many decades. Similar towers already existed in Düsseldorf (1954, 143 m), Sao Paulo (1954, 100 m) and other cities. During the night the tower was illuminated with neon lamps. A corner junction was specially exhibited at the foot so that the connection between the individual pipes could be seen.

When Mannesmann exhibited at a trade fair in the 1950s and 1960s, it had its stand by this tower. It served the cellular and non-public mobile land radio service, including the radio of the medical emergency service. At the end of the 1950s, thought was given to erecting a meteorological measuring point on the tower in order to record ground inversions, as it protruded just above the level of the factory chimneys. Meteorological measuring stations were actually implemented and planned from the start at the Danube Tower. The tower was demolished in 1987.

== See also ==
- List of tallest structures in Austria
- Mannesmann Tower (Hannover)
