= Kronstorf Transmitter =

Broadcasting facility in Austria

Coordinates: 48°9′37.1″N 14°26′53.2″E

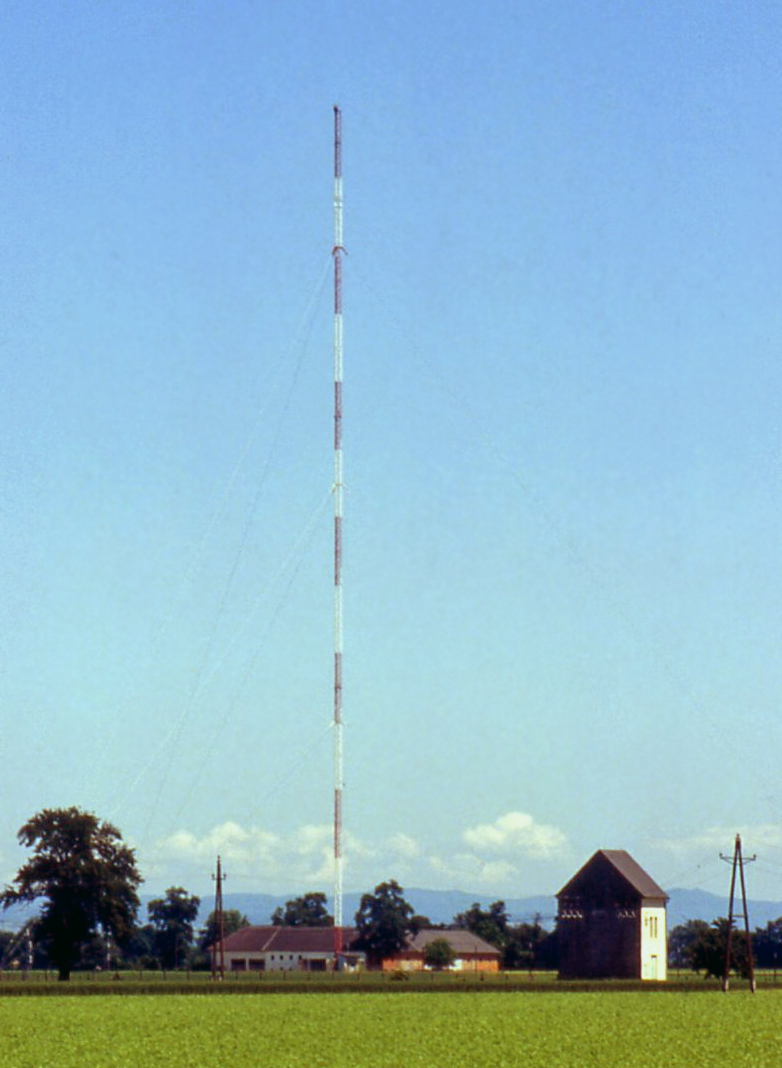
The transmitter c.1994

The Kronstorf Transmitter was a mediumwave (and, starting in 1967, shortwave) broadcasting facility near Kronstorf, Austria. Its construction started in 1950 by the American Forces occupying Austria, and went in service on 1952-03-01. The transmitter, used for broadcasting in Soviet-controlled Austria, consisted of one 274 m and two 137 m guyed masts.

On 1954-03-15, the facility was given to the Austrian broadcasting company, Österreichischer Rundfunk (ORF). A 274 m (900 ft) and a 137 m (450 ft) mast were dismantled in 1956, and then rebuilt at the Bisamberg transmission facility. There were further plans in the 1970s to renovate the transmitter, but as most of Austria is mountainous areas, medium wave propagation was not an efficient transmission method.

The Kronstorf Transmitter was shut down in March 1994, and on 1995-01-26 the transmission mast was demolished by explosives.

== See also ==
- List of masts
