= Donauturm =

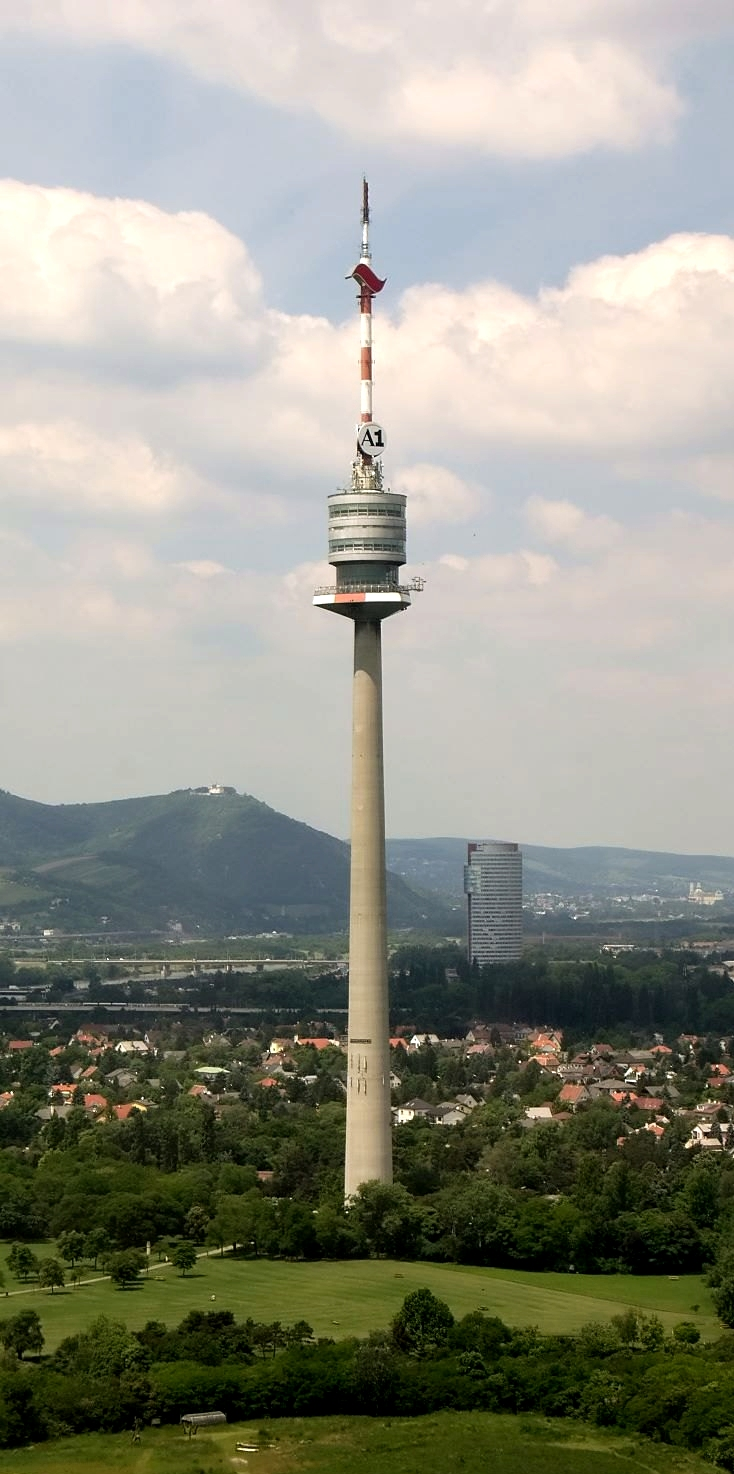
- Looking northwest towards the Donauturm; the hills Leopoldsberg and Kahlenberg are visible in the background.

General information
- Location: Vienna
- Coordinates: 48°14′24″N 16°24′39″E
- Construction started: 1962
- Completed: 1964

Height
- Antenna spire: 252

Technical details
- Lifts/elevators: 2

Design and construction
- Architect: Hannes Lintl

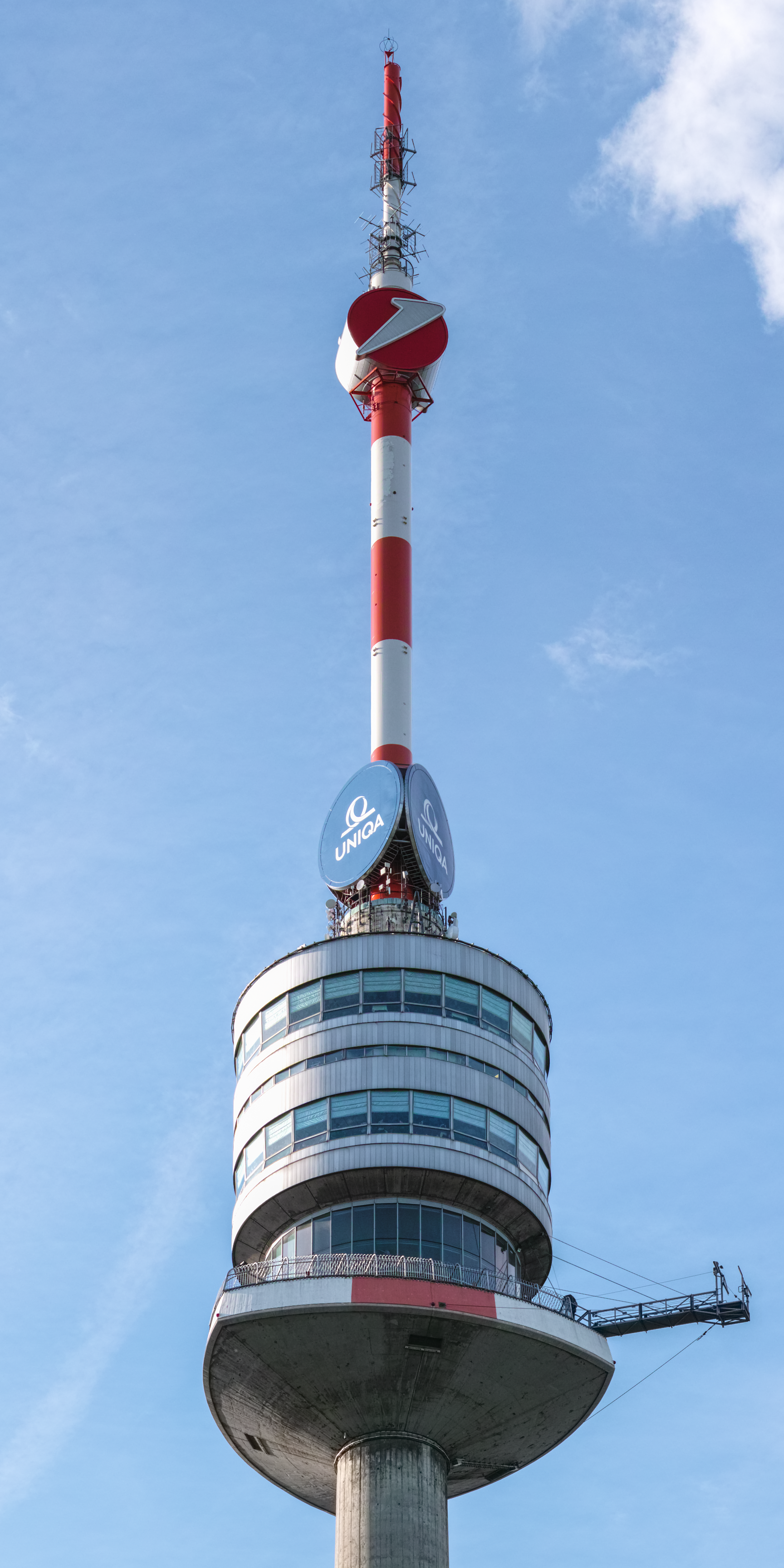
The observation decks and spire of the Donauturm

The Donauturm (English: Danube Tower) is a tower located in the Donaupark, Vienna, Austria. Opened in April 1964, it is the tallest structure in Austria, standing at 252 meters (827 feet), and ranks as the 61st tallest tower in the world.

== History ==
The Donauturm was built as an attraction for the Vienna International Garden Show 1964. It’s financing came largely from the Zentralsparkasse, with a small contribution from the Schwechat Brewery. The tower was designed by Hannes Lintl and Robert Krapfenbauer. The foundation stone was laid on October 12, 1962, and the tower was officially opened on April 16, 1964, the opening day of the garden show.

== Facilities ==
=== High-speed elevators ===
Two high-speed elevators transport passengers to the tower's viewing platform at 150 metres (490 ft). Each lift, carrying up to 14 passengers, takes only 35 seconds to reach the observation platform. In strong winds, the elevators travel at only half speed because of the possible fluctuation of the tower: the movement of the elevator cable could be dangerous. By walking about 779 steps (775, according to architects Lintl), the platform can also be reached on foot. The stairs are, however, usually only accessible during the annual Donauturm run, or in an emergency.

=== Antennas and radio transmitter ===
The Donauturm spire carries antennas of cellular phone networks, private VHF radio stations and several other radio communication services. Despite its similarity to TV towers elsewhere, it has not been used for TV broadcasting. The major TV transmitter for the Vienna area is situated on Kahlenberg hill (see image at top).

Radiostation	Frequency	ERP	since
Radio Arabella Wien	92,9 MHz	2,6653 kW	14 Dec 2001
Orange 94.0	94,0 MHz	0,3981 kW	17 Aug 1998
98,3 Superfly	98,3 MHz	0,3802 kW	29 Feb 2008
Radio Stephansdom	107,3 MHz	1,9999 kW	24 Sept 1998

=== Viewing platform ===
Two revolving restaurants (at a height of 161.2 and 169.4 metres, or 529 and 556 ft) offer a varied view over the Austrian capital and the Danube River below. It takes the platform either 26, 39 or 52 minutes to complete a full revolution. The restaurants were originally largely identical; now the top is an "upscale" restaurant (named "Turm-Restaurant") and the lower restaurant is a café (named "Turm-Café").

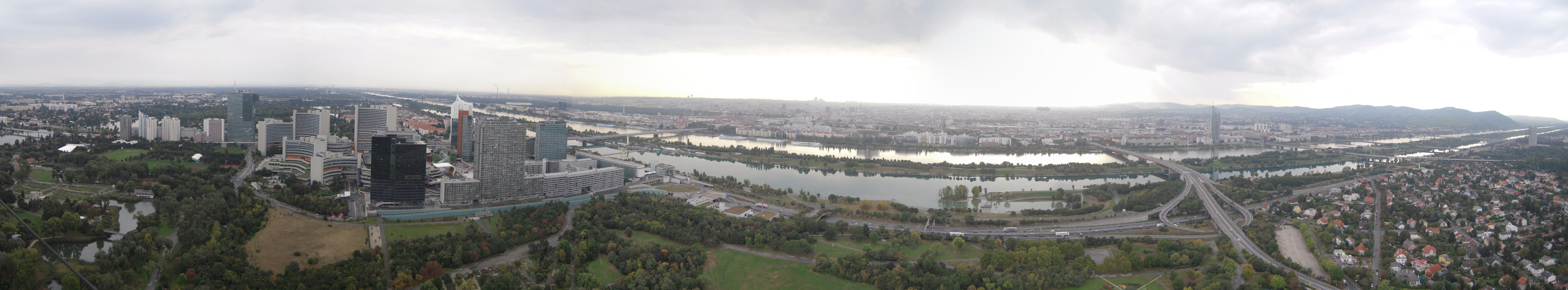
View of Vienna; the skyscrapers of Donau City are visible on the left
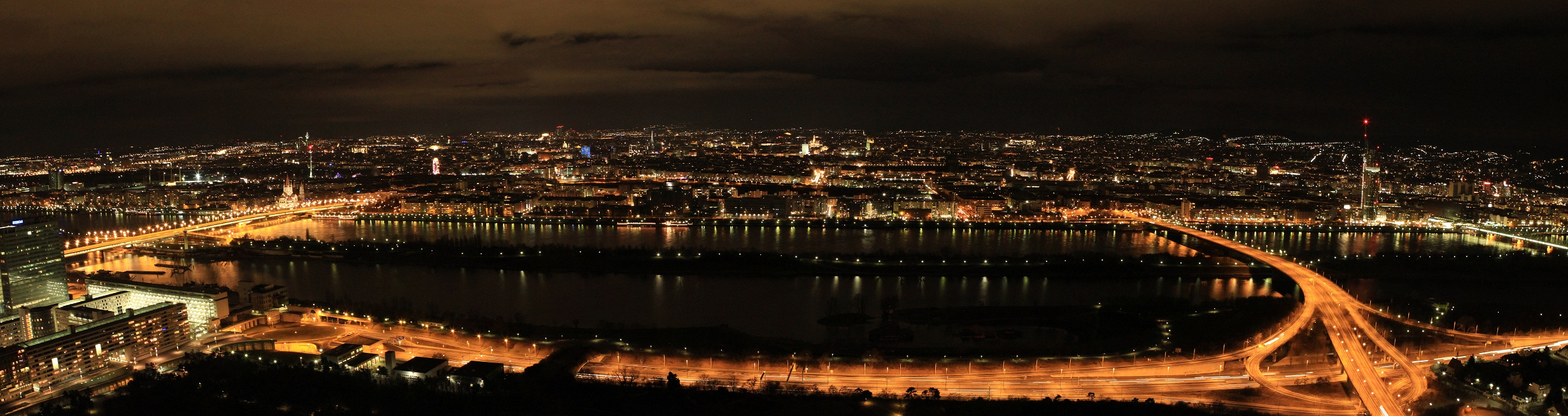
Night view of Vienna.

== Ballooning accident in 1968 ==
At a meeting of Pro Juventute on 6 June 1968, four gas balloons were launched from a meadow at Donauturm. While three of them floated past the tower, the fourth was driven against the tower, where it was initially hung on the security grills, at a height of approx. 150 m. The balloon net tore and the balloon envelope broke free. The remnants of the net and the basket fell to the ground. American balloonist Francis Shields died, along with two Austrian passengers: a higher official of the Austrian Post and Telegraph Management, Guntram Pammer, and journalist Dieter Kasper of the Austrian Press agency.

Footage of the incident appeared in the film Days of Fury (1979), directed by Fred Warshofsky and hosted by Vincent Price.

== Wikipedia naming controversy ==
The Donauturm shares some architectural features with the Fernsehturm Stuttgart, but was never planned for TV broadcasting purposes. The German Wikipedia had an approximately 600,000-character discussion about the suitable title and categories, as some authors, many of them Austrian, regarded the Donauturm as a mere observation tower. Der Spiegel coverage of the issue cited a participant with "On good days, Wikipedia is better than any TV soap".

== See also ==
- Wiener Riesenrad – giant Ferris wheel in Vienna
- List of tallest buildings and structures in Austria
- Fernsehturm Stuttgart – first TV tower built from concrete and prototype
- Fernsehturm Berlin – similar tower in Berlin, Germany (although 45% taller)
- List of towers
- List of masts
- List of restaurants in Vienna
