= Hannes Lintl =

Austrian architect (1924–2003)

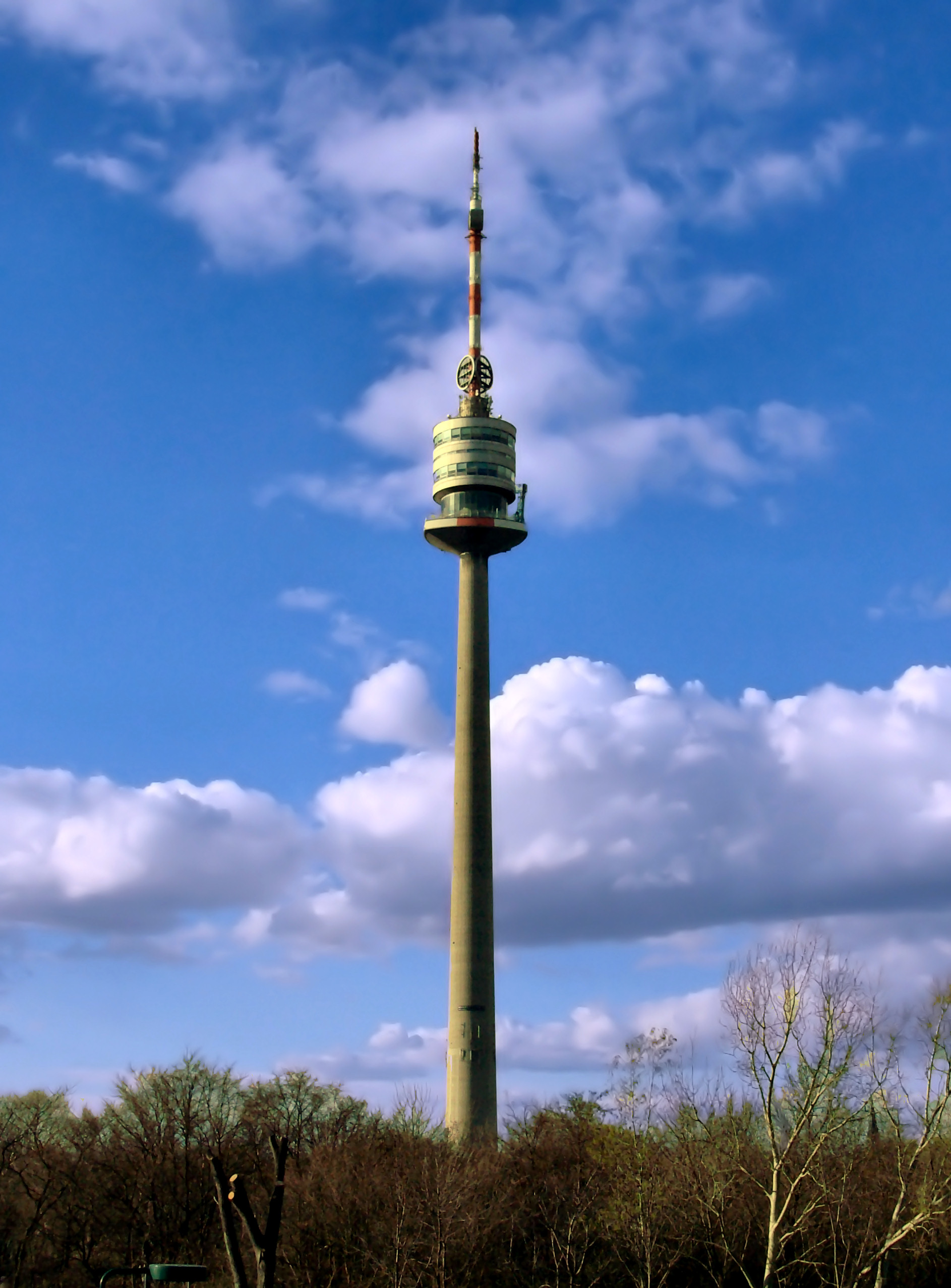
The Donauturm, by Hannes Lintl

Hannes Lintl (2 July 1924 – 13 June 2003) was an Austrian architect, best known for designing the Donauturm (Danube Tower, 1964), part of the Viennese skyline and a popular lookout point and tourist attraction.

Hannes-Lintl-Gasse, a street in Vienna’s twenty-second district, is named after him.

== Timeline ==
- 1948 Academy of Applied Arts Vienna, awarded the Josef Hoffmann Prize
- 1952 Academy of Fine Arts Vienna, studying under Prof. C. Holzmeister
- 1957 Receives his Ziviltechnikerbefugnis (licence) and opens his architectural firm
- 1966 Gold Medal for Architecture of the City of Vienna
- 1967 Appointment as Jordanian Consul General in Austria
- 1969 Awarded the title of Professor by Franz Jonas, the President of Austria
- 2000 Awarded the Austrian Cross of Honour for Science and Art, 1st class
- Grand Decoration of Honour in Silver for Services to the Republic of Austria
- Grand Cordon of the Order of Independence (Jordan) (Al Istiqlal)

== Projects ==
This list includes finished projects with a total cost exceeding €10,900,000 (150 million schillings) each. ARGE stands for Arbeitsgemeinschaft, or "working group".

=== Schools and other educational institutions ===
- Höhere Technische Lehranstalt, Innsbruck
- Bundesgymnasium & Bundesrealgymnasium, Pichelmayergasse, Vienna
- Bundesrealgymnasium Leibnitz
- Bundesrealgymnasium Zwettl
- Bildungshaus Neuwaldegg, Vienna
- Medizintechnische Schule im AKH, Vienna
- Zentralberufsschule für KFZ-Mechanik, Scheydgasse, Vienna
- Addition to the Wirtschaftsförderungsinstitut, Währinger Gürtel, Vienna (ARGE)
- Volksschule und Sonderpädagogisches Zentrum, Hammerfestweg, Vienna

=== Office buildings ===
- Saudi Electricity Company, Jeddah, Saudi Arabia
- Palais Grassalkovics, Wiener Fremdenverkehrsverband ("Vienna Tourism Association"), Obere Augartenstraße, Vienna
- Büro- und Wohnhaus, Obere Donaustraße 21, Vienna
- Zentralanstalt der Pensionsversicherung der Angestellten, Vienna (ARGE)
- Erweiterung Wirtschaftskammer Österreich, Wiener Hauptstrasse, Vienna
- IBM, Lassallestraße, Vienna (ARGE)
- Bank Austria, Lassallestraße, Vienna (ARGE)
- Donau-Business-Center, Handelskai 388, Vienna
- Zürich Kosmos, Lassallestraße, Vienna

=== Hospitals, medical centres, and aged care facilities ===
- Allgemeines Krankenhaus, Vienna (ARGE)
- Krankenhaus Zell am See, Salzburg
- Neurochirurgische Universitätsklinik im AKH, Vienna
- AUVA Rehabilitationszentrum Weißer Hof, Klosterneuburg (ARGE)
- AUVA Rehabilitationszentrum Tobelbad, Styria (ARGE)
- Heim für betagte Menschen, Breitenfurterstraße, Vienna
- Seniorenwohnheim Wohnstift Augustinum, Kurpark Oberlaa, Vienna (ARGE)

=== Industrial buildings ===
- Three power stations for the Saudi Electric Company in Jeddah, Mecca and Ta'if, Saudi Arabia
- Siemens Werk für Elektronikfertigung, Weißgerberlände, Vienna
- Addition to the Porzellanmanufaktur Augarten, Vienna

=== Shopping centres ===
- Modezentrum Boecker, Vienna
- Generali Centre, Vienna (ARGE)
- Zentrum Simmering, Vienna
- Ringstraßen-Galerien, Kärntnerring, Vienna (ARGE)

=== Housing estates ===
- Wohnhausanlage Arsenal, Vienna
- Wohnhausanlage Oswald Redlich-Straße, Vienna
- Personalwohnhaus UKH Meidling, Vienna

=== Hotels ===
- Addition to the Zürserhof, Zürs am Arlberg
- Corso Grand Hotel, Kärntnerring, Vienna (ARGE)

=== Representative buildings ===
- Indonesian Embassy, Vienna
- Raghadan Palace, Amman, Jordan

=== Telecommunications buildings ===
- Television Production Centre, Amman, Jordan

=== Miscellaneous ===
- Donauturm, Vienna
- St. John's Beacon, Liverpool
- Baghdad Television Tower, Iraq (destroyed during war)
- Jakarta Bung Karno Tower, Indonesia (project abandoned)
- Montreal Television Tower, Canada (design only)
- Ausbildungs- und Einsatzzentrale des Einsatzkommandos COBRA, New Vienna
