= Mannesmann Tower (Hannover) =

Coordinates: 52°19′41″N 9°48′14″E

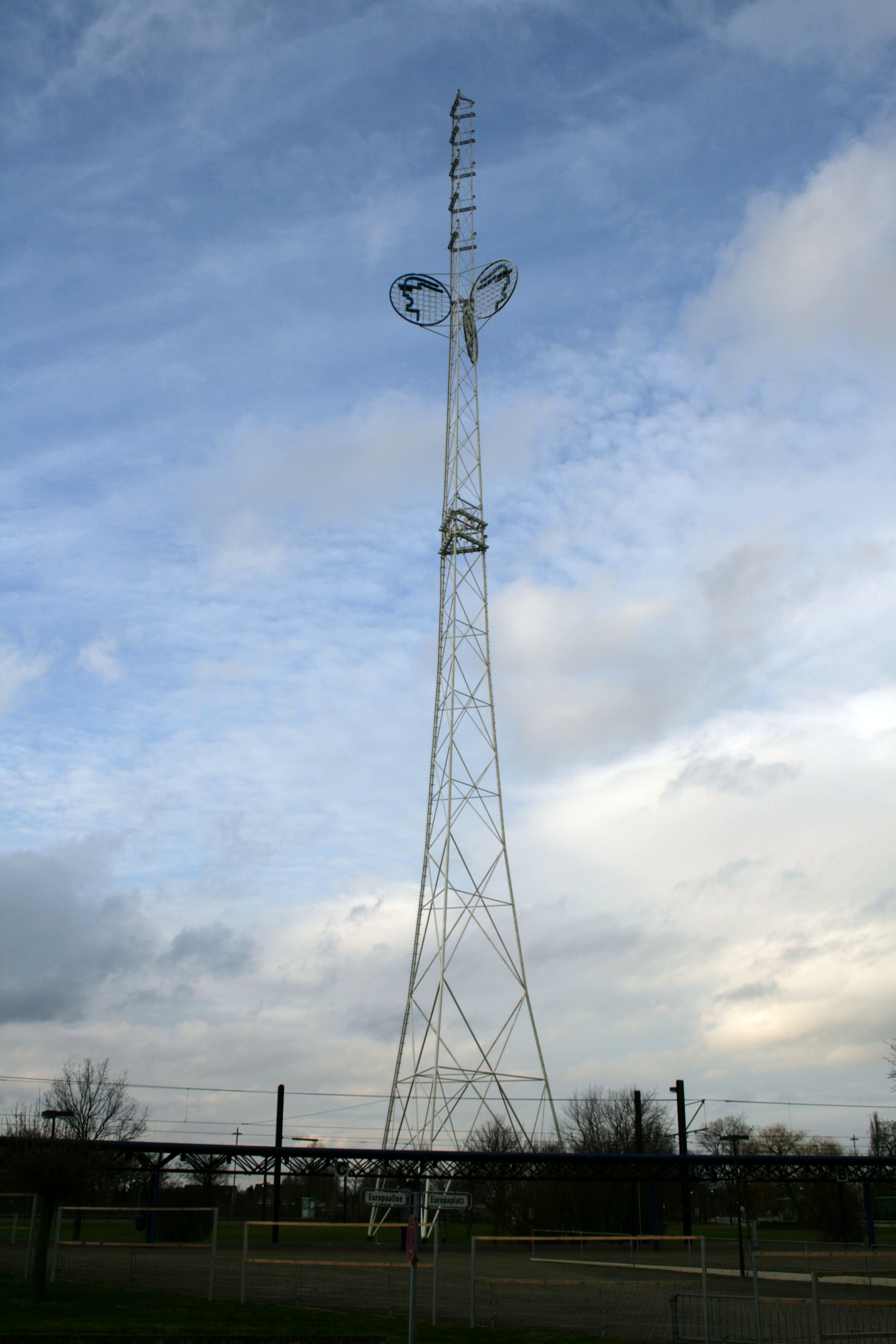
Mannesmann Tower

The Mannesmann Tower was a tower on the Hanover fairground in Hanover, Germany. It was a free-standing lattice tower with a triangular cross-section, standing 120 metres (390 ft) high and carried the logo of the Hanover Fair, which erected the tower in 1954, at a height of 89.8 metres (295 ft). The Mannesmann Tower hosted aerials for mobile phone services.

It was demolished on 21 June 2012 due to its poor condition.

== See also ==
- List of towers
- Mannesmann Tower (Vienna)
