= Sendeanlage Bisamberg =

Coordinates: 48°18′41″N 16°23′03″E

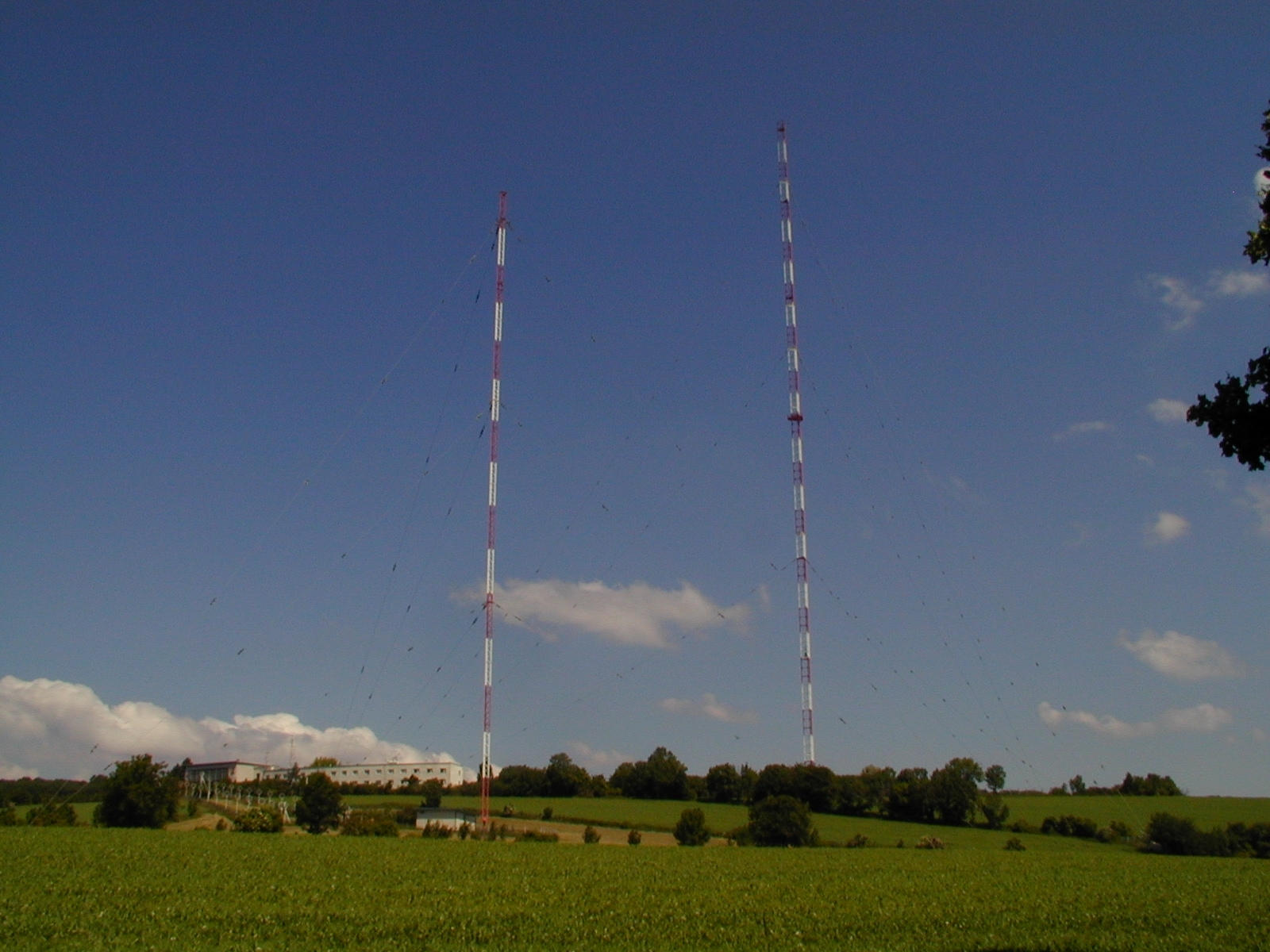
Left to right: control building, south mast (120 m), north mast (265 m)

The Sendeanlage Bisamberg (Bisamberg transmission facility) was an Austrian medium wave transmission facility built in 1933 and demolished on February 24, 2010.

The original transmitter was destroyed at the end of World War II, but was later rebuilt. It had two guyed steel framework masts, one with a height of 265 metres and another with a height of 120 metres. Both masts were insulated against ground. The higher mast, which was the tallest construction of Austria before demolition, was designed for use on 585 kHz, while the smaller one was designed for 1476 kHz.

From January 1, 1995 to July 1, 1997, the installation was shut down, with the 1476 kHz transmitter being reactivated on July 1, 1997. The masts were demolished with controlled explosions on February 24, 2010; this decision by the city of Vienna was based on the fact that maintenance of the technologically obsolete masts as historical monuments would have been too costly.

As of February 24, 2010, the Danube Tower is the tallest structure in Austria.

== See also ==
- List of masts
