= Kahlenberg Transmitter =

Coordinates: 48°16′36″N 16°20′02″E

The Kahlenberg Transmitter is a facility for FM- and TV on the Kahlenberg near Vienna. It was established in 1953 and used until 1956 an antenna on the observation tower Stefaniewarte. From 1956 to 1974 a 129-metre-high guyed mast built of lattice steel was used. Since 1974 a 165-metre-high guyed steel tube mast has been used, which is equipped with rooms of technical equipment.

== See also ==
List of masts
