= Freinberg Transmitter =

Coordinates: 48°17′50″N 14°16′02″E

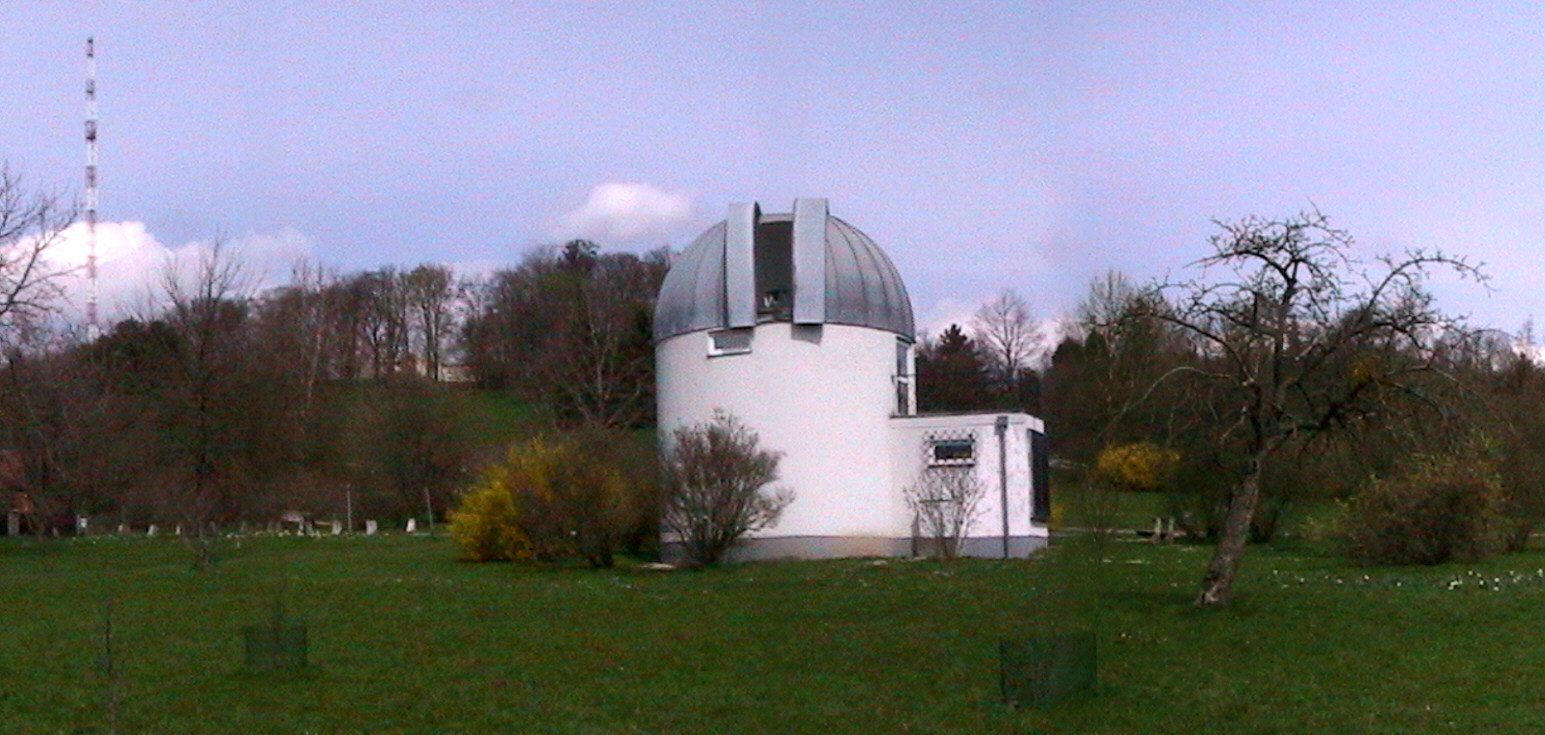
The Johannes Kepler Observatory Linz with the Freinberg transmitter in the background at left.

The Freinberg Transmitter is a broadcasting transmitter on the Freinberg near Linz. It was established in 1928 as medium wave broadcasting station and used until 1936 a T-antenna, which hung up on two guyed masts, which were 45 metres tall.

In 1936, the T-antenna was replaced by a 165-metre-tall (541 ft) mast, insulated against ground.

In summer 1950, the antenna mast was shortened to 120 metres, because it was too long for the new frequency and would have a bad radiation diagram.

In October 1957, the mast was again extended to 146 metres and in 1965 the transmitters were replaced by a new device.

At the beginning of the 1980s, medium wave broadcasting ceased at Freinberg. The mast is now used for FM transmission.

== See also ==
- List of masts
