= Transmitter station =

Installation used for transmitting radio frequency signals

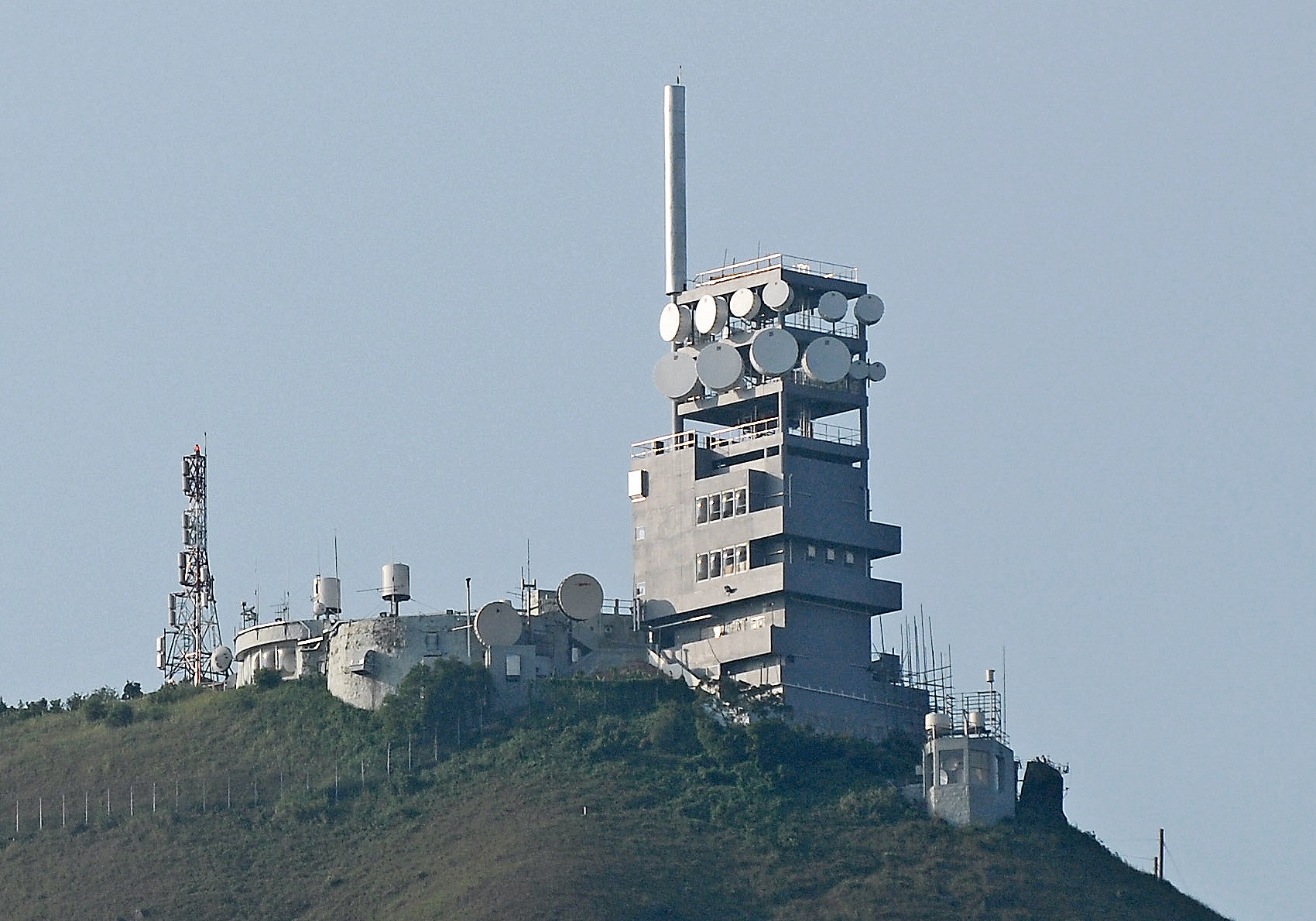
A TV transmitter station tower in Temple Hill, Hong Kong.

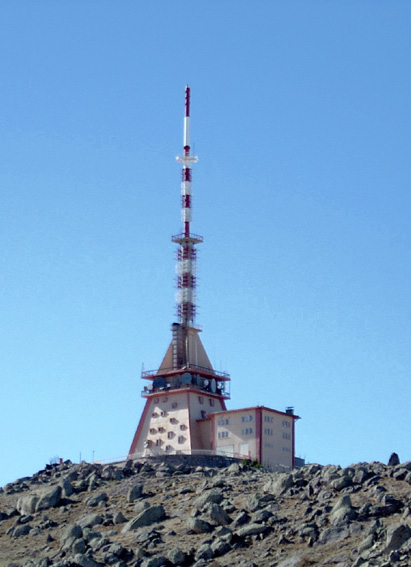
A TV transmitter station in Karaman, Turkey

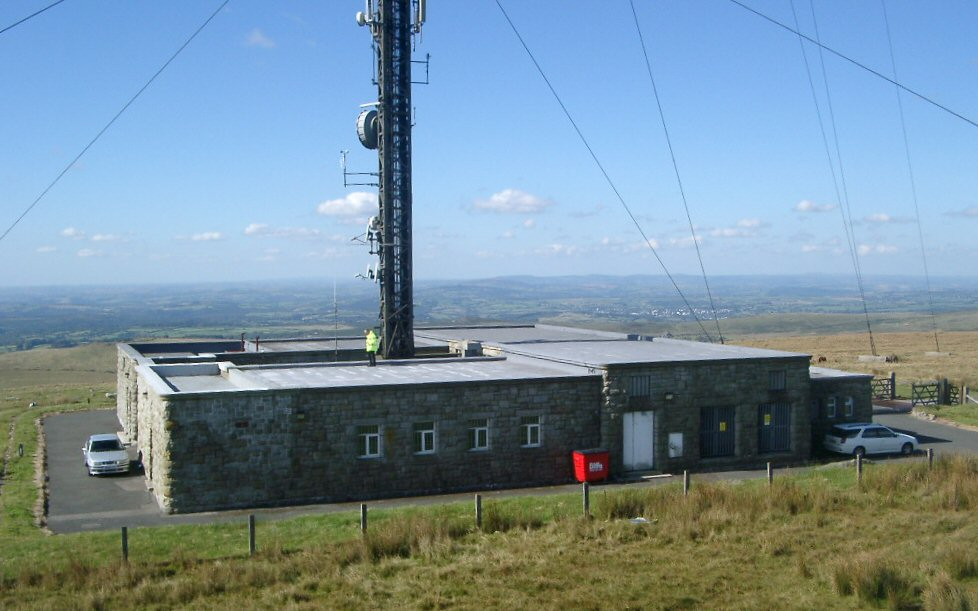
A transmitter station building in Devon, Britain

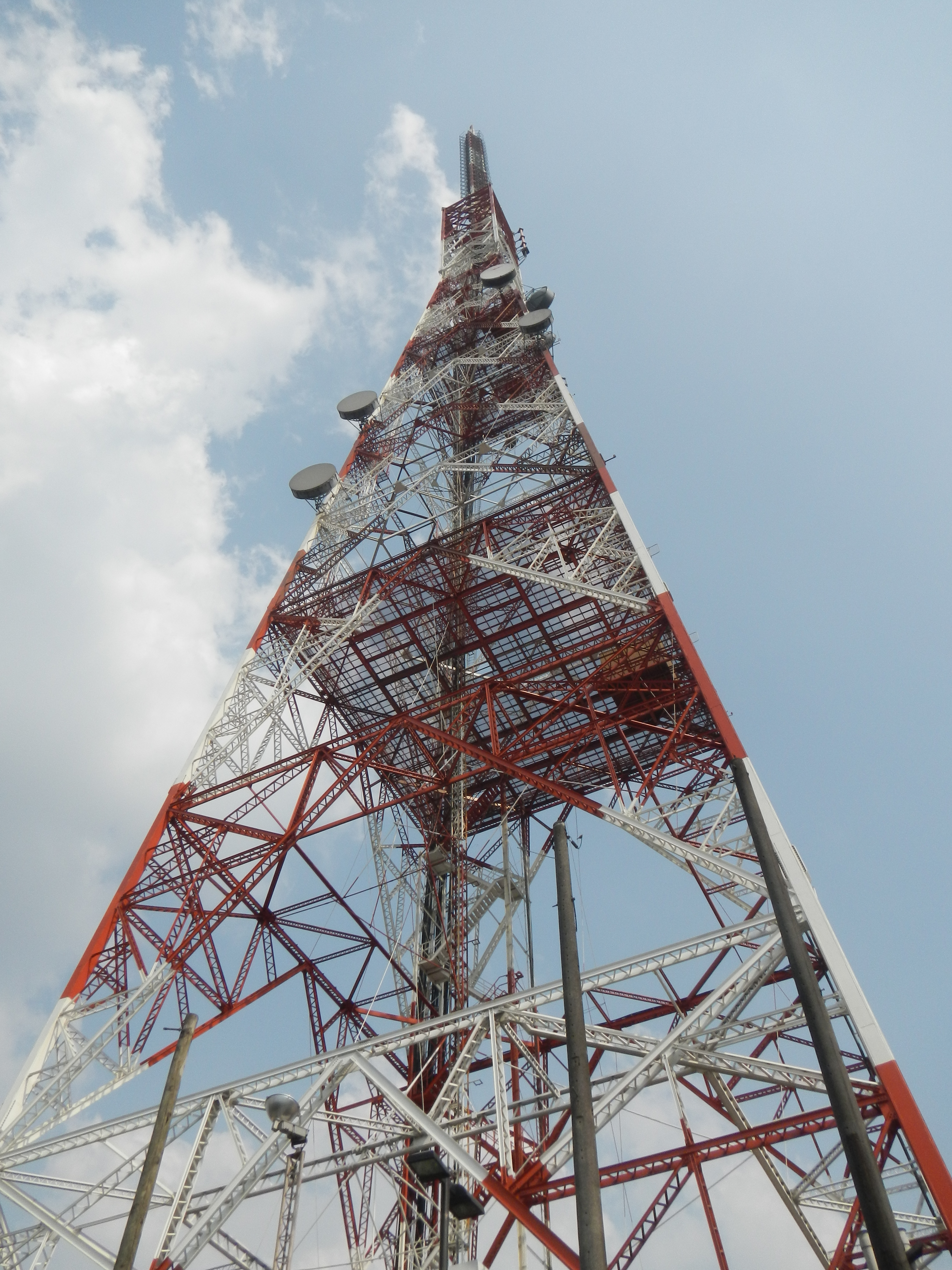
A TV transmitter station tower in Diliman, Quezon City, Philippines.

A transmitter station or transmission facility is an installation used for transmitting radio frequency signals for wireless communication, broadcasting, microwave link, mobile telephone or other purposes.

== Choice of location ==
The location may be chosen to fit the coverage area and for VHF-UHF-applications line of sight considerations. For lower frequencies a location with good ground conductivity is required. In case of microwave link chains, stations should be in observable ranges of each other. (see Earth bulge) Computer programmes for the terrain profile and abacs are used in addition to on site observations. Avoidance of industrial noise is also taken into consideration. Another parameter may be the government regulations concerning public health requiring a minimum distance to human habitation. The distance depends on the power and the frequency of the transmitting signal. Low power stations may be in cities; higher power stations are always in rural areas. Most of the stations (especially high frequency stations) are located at high altitudes. So, both the minimum distance regulations and the line of sight criteria are met.

== Buildings and antenna masts ==
Stations may be housed in several buildings or a single building. In some cases the station is nothing but a small container.

They all have masts or towers to install antenna systems. In most cases, the mast is a passive structure to support the antennas. But in low frequency stations (such as AM radio), the mast itself may be the active antenna element. In such cases, the mast is isolated from the ground.(See Monopole antenna). If the mast itself is an active antenna element, the ground can be covered by a mesh of wires or metal elements to create a reflecting ground. Most of the stations also have facility to receive microwave signals from a microwave link or a telecommunications satellite, (TVRO or RRO).

Most stations use mains electricity, but they also have standby generators or solar energy panels in case of failure. If the voltage of the mains fluctuates, a high power voltage regulator may be used.

== Grounding ==
Like all industrial sites, the buildings, the antenna masts, the generators, and the transmitting equipment of the stations should be grounded for personal safety against electrical shocks. On the masts and roofs, lightning rods should be used. For transmitter stations working on frequencies below 30 MHz a good grounding is required for good function and sometimes excessive grounding systems are used. In most cases, it is desirable to connect the rods to each other to form a simple Faraday cage. But in high altitude stations, the ground is usually rocky and finding an appropriate point for the grounding bus may be impossible. In such cases, very long grounding connectors may be used to find a good ground at lower altitudes.

== Operation ==
Transmitters may be operated by government (civil or military) or private industry. Many stations are unattended and controlled by remote control equipment. Where operating personnel are required, personnel work on shifts and transportation may also be a parameter of station design. In such cases, accommodation, catering and health problems also play a part in station management. Especially in high altitude stations, snowmobiles must be used during winter.

== Transmitting equipment ==
Most AM radio transmitters are high-power equipment. Because of the relatively low frequency they use, they don't need to be located in high places. They may broadcast in LW (long wave), MW (medium wave) or SW (short wave). Since SW stations are assigned for very long distance communication (via reflections from atmospheric layers) they are usually employed for multi-language international services and there may be many SW transmitters in the same station.

TV and FM (frequency modulated) radio transmitter stations as well as transposer stations are almost always built on top of hills. A single station may have many transmitters both for TV and FM. In rare cases, each transmitter has an antenna system. But in stations where many transmitters are used, this is not always possible, so the outputs of transmitters transmitting in the same frequency band are combined by a diplexer and applied to a single antenna system. (i.e. VHF 1, VHF 2, VHF 3, UHF). If two or more antenna systems have to be used, higher frequency antennas are mounted higher on the antenna mast. (The sequence of antenna systems on a typical TV-FM station may be from bottom to top; VHF-2, VHF-3 and UHF.) Microwave stations are also high altitude stations. Although high altitude is desirable also in GSM, the operators may use low power intracity stations for areas of high population density.
