= TrIIIple Towers =

Skyscraper in Vienna, Austria

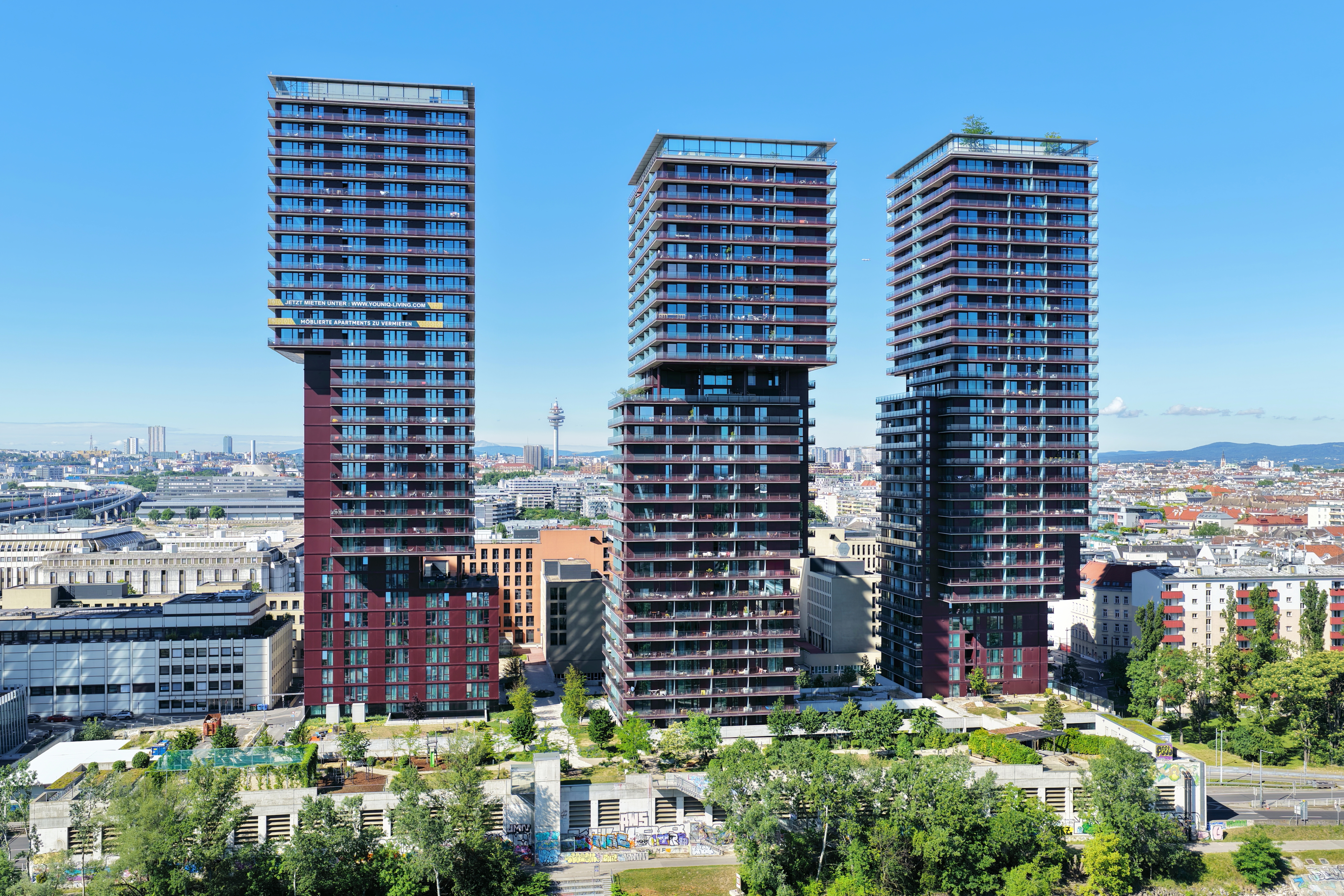

General information
- Status: Completed
- Type: Residential
- Location: Vienna, Austria, 9–13 Schnirchgasse, Vienna, Austria
- Coordinates: 48.19489°N 16.41100°E
- Construction started: 2017
- Completed: 2021
- Cost: €300,000,000

Height
- Roof: 120.2 m (394 ft) (Tower 3)

Technical details
- Structural system: Concrete
- Floor count: 35 (Tower 3)
- Floor area: 70,000 m^{2} (753,000 sq ft)
- Lifts/elevators: Schindler

Design and construction
- Architect: Henke Schreieck
- Developer: ARE Austrian Real Estate; Soravia Investment Holding
- Structural engineer: Gmeiner Haferl Zivilingenieure ZT; KS Ingenieure ZT
- Main contractor: Strabag

Website
- TrIIIple

The TrIIIple Towers is a high-rise residential building complex in the Landstraße district of Vienna, Austria. Built between 2017 and 2021, the complex consists of three towers with the tallest standing at 120.2 m (394 ft) tall with 35 floors which is the current 10th tallest building in Austria.

== History ==
=== Architecture ===
The project is located on the Danube Canal in Vienna's third district (Erdberg district). The building complex consists of three towers (each around 100 metres high) with a usable area of around 70,000 m^{2} (753,000 sq ft).

The TrIIIple Towers were designed by the architectural team Henke Schreieck. The project was developed by project partners SORAVIA and ARE Development in cooperation with the City of Vienna on the site of the former main customs office, which was located there from the 1970s.

Towers 1 and 2 are used for privately financed housing while tower 3 currently houses YOUNIQ TrIIIple Vienna (originally Linked Living) Which contains around 670 micro apartments for students and young professionals. .

The project volume was more than 300 million euros.

The TrIIIple Towers are among the finalists of the International Highrise Award 2022/23 of the city of Frankfurt am Main. The International Highrise Award is awarded every two years for a high-rise building. The selection criteria include exemplary sustainability, external design and internal spatial qualities as well as social and urban planning aspects. For example, an energy-saving river water cooling and heating system is used to cool the TrIIIple Towers.

A group of apartment buyers criticises the allegedly high costs of heating and cooling and claims that the supply to the neighbouring Austro Tower is illegal. In two related court cases, the apartment owners were found to be right in the first instance, and an appeal is pending.

== Buildings ==
Name	Height m (ft)	Floors	Ref
Tower I	117 m (384 ft)	34	
Tower II	108 m (354 ft)	31	
Tower III	120.2 m (394 ft)	35	

== Gallery ==
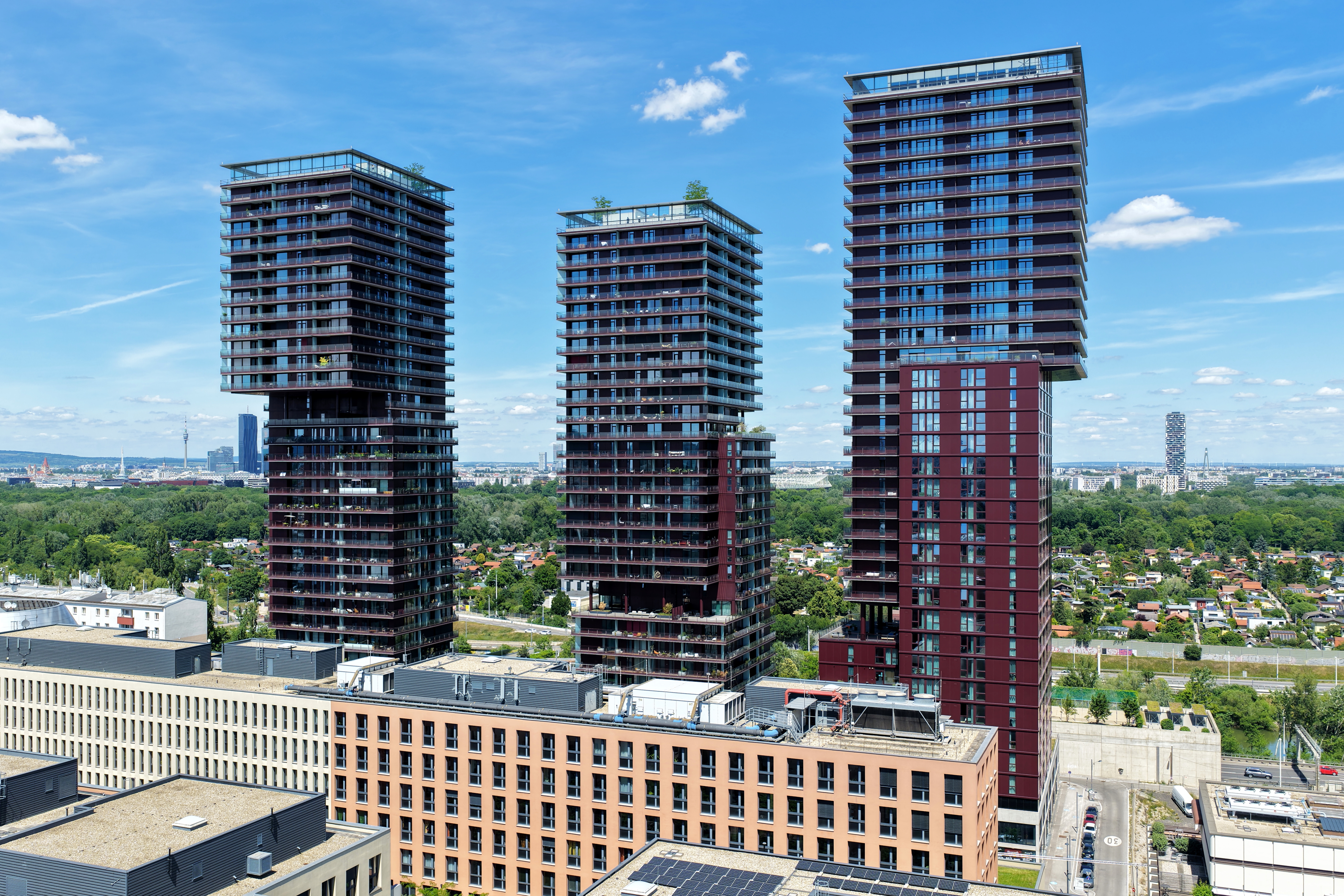
South-southwest view; from left to right: Tower 1, 2 and 3

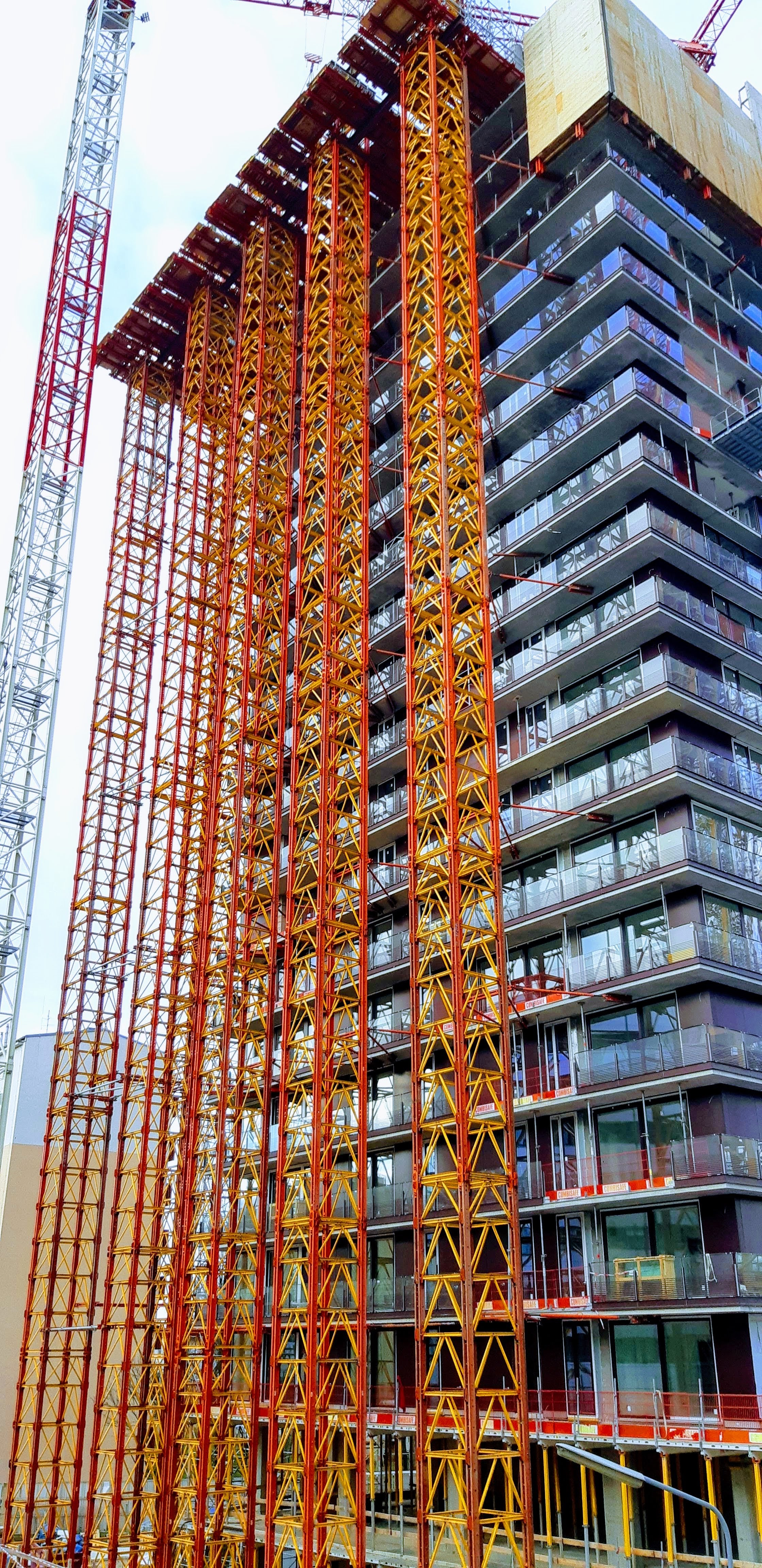
Tower 1 under construction in February 2020

== See also ==
- List of tallest buildings in Austria
