= Aldrans Transmitter =

Aldrans Transmitter was a facility for medium wave broadcasting at Aldrans near Innsbruck in Austria.

Originally built in 1927, using a T-antenna hung on two 151-metre-tall (495 ft) guyed masts, the station was modernized between 1953 and 1955. The power of the transmitters were increased and two mast radiators insulated against the ground were built. There was also a shortwave transmitter installed.

It was shut down on 1 March 1984 and afterwards dismantled.
