= Kahlenberg =

Mountain in Vienna, Austria

Coordinates: 48°17′N 16°20′E

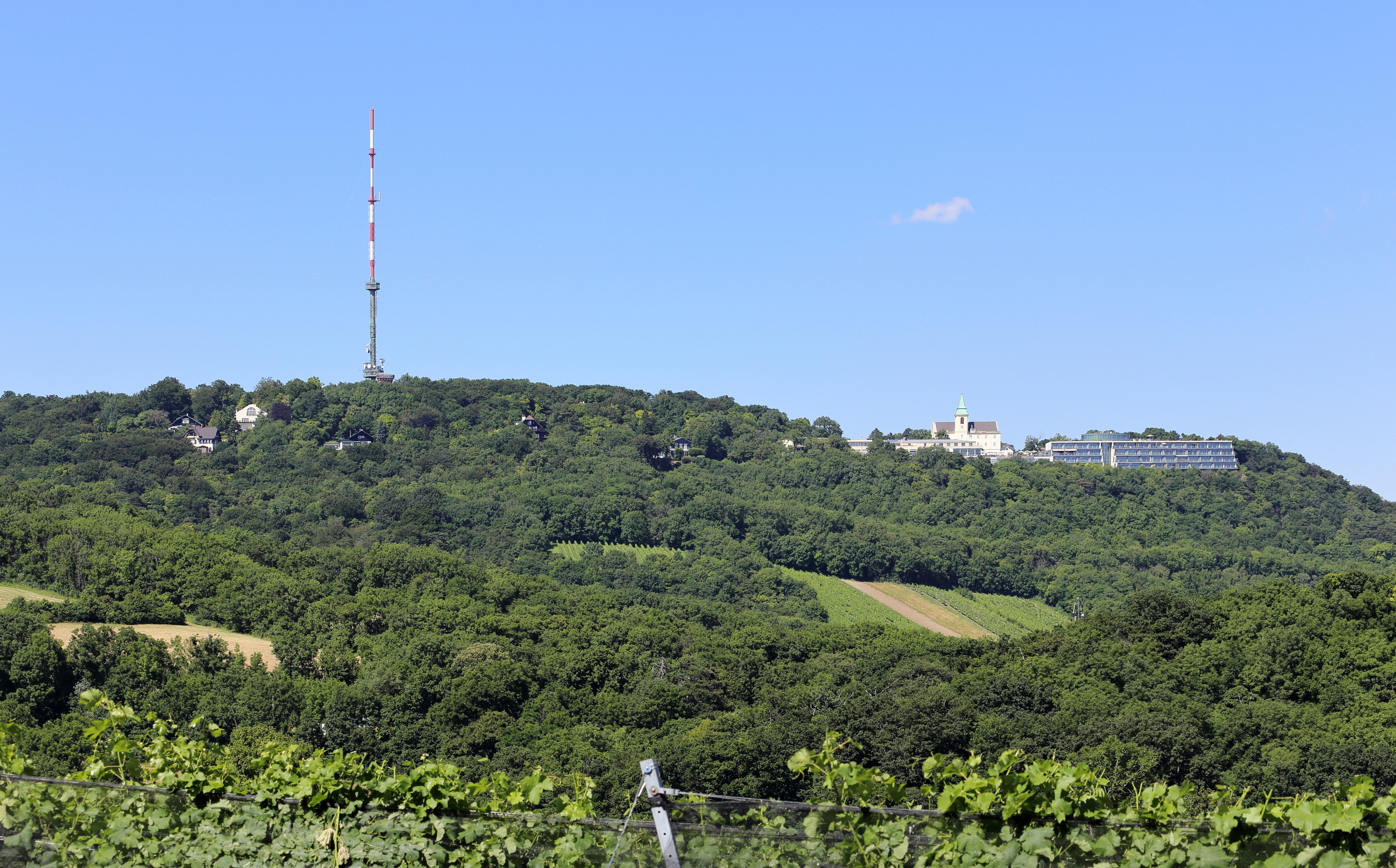
Kahlenberg with the tower, church, and scenic overlook

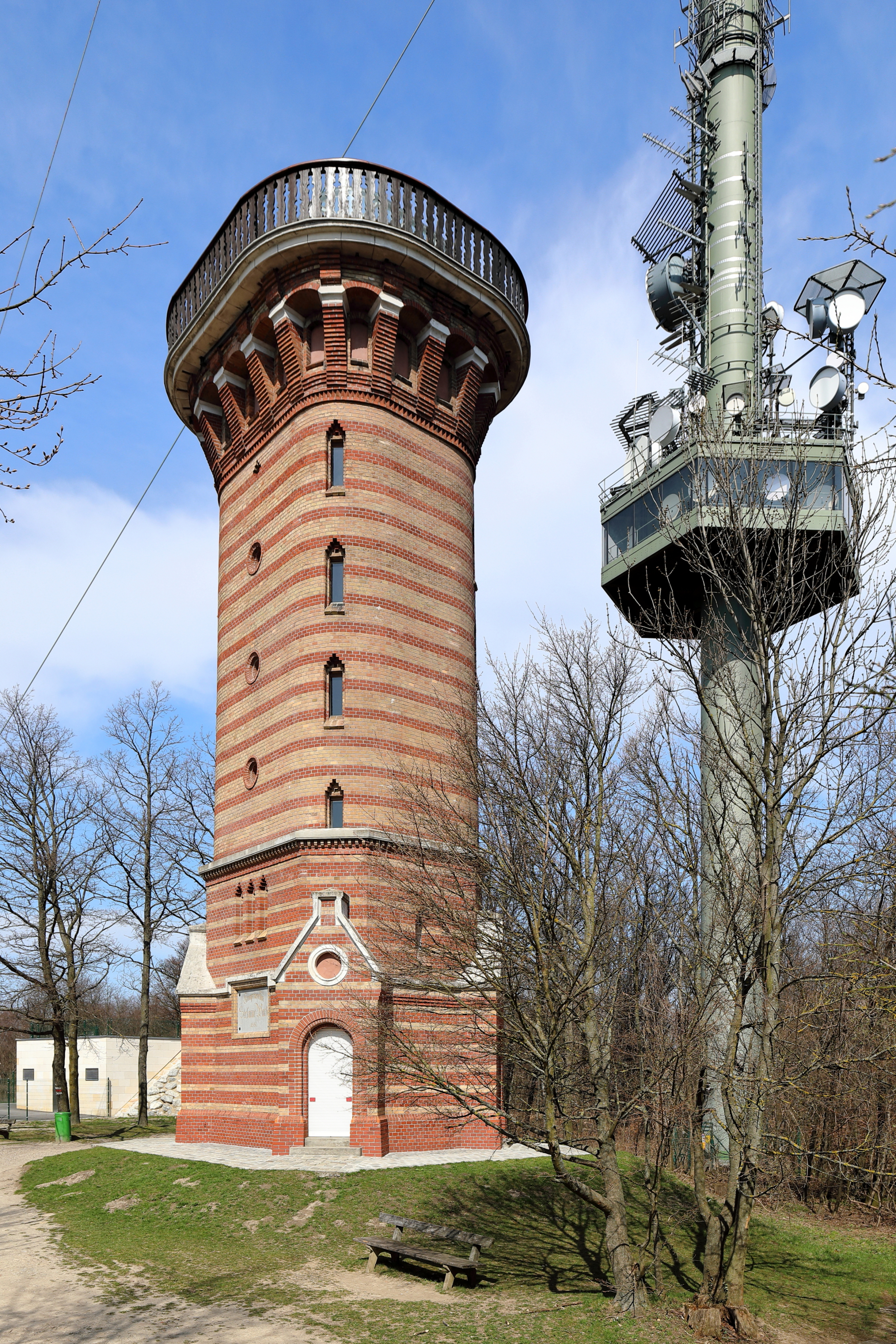
Stefaniewarte and steel tower

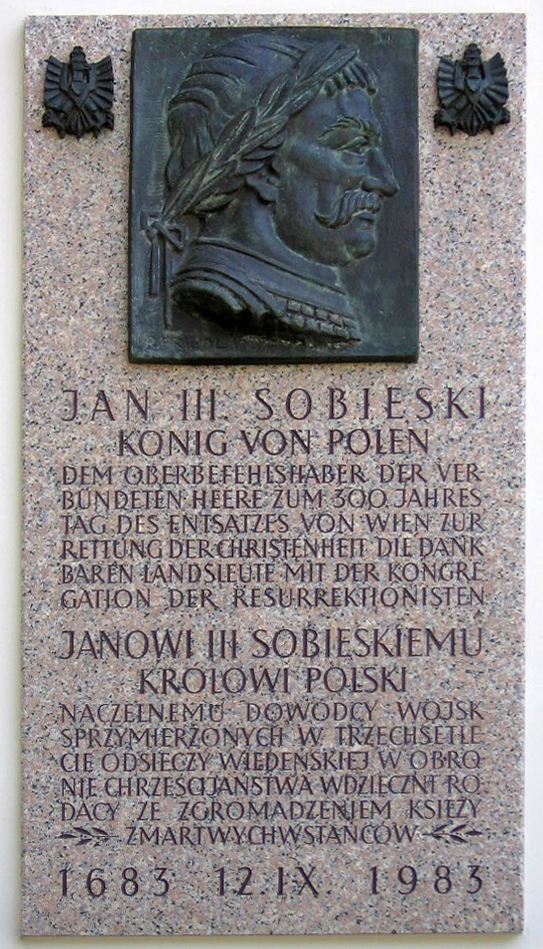
Commemorative plaque placed on the facade of the Polish church on Kahlenberg

The Kahlenberg (German pronunciation: [ˈkaːlənˌbɛʁk]) is a hill (484 m or 1,588 ft) located in the 19th District of Vienna, Austria (Döbling).

== General ==
The Kahlenberg lies in the Vienna Woods and is one of the most popular destinations for day-trips from Vienna, offering a view over the entire city. Parts of Lower Austria can also be seen from Stefaniewarte at the peak. Next to Stefaniewarte is a 165-meter high steel tower that serves as the transmitter for the ORF, the Austrian Broadcast Corporation. Two terraces are located on the mountain: one at a small church called St. Josef and one at a restaurant built in the 1930s by architect Erich Boltenstern. Parts of the restaurant and a nearby abandoned hotel have been torn down and replaced by a modern restaurant and Modul University Vienna, a private university established in 2007, focusing on Social and Economic Development, in particular in the areas of tourism, information technology and public governance. The demolition was opposed by the local historical society and by some architects who believed the building was worth protecting. There is also a spiritual recovery center and a center for a Catholic reform movement, the Schönstattbewegung Österreich.

== Geography ==
Kahlenberg is 484 meters high and lies in the northeastern foothills of the Eastern Alps. The mountain is mostly flysch, composed of quartz, limestone, marl, and other conglomerates. East of Kahlenberg is Leopoldsberg; and to the west are Reisenberg, Latisberg, and Hermannskogel.

== History ==
Kahlenberg (German: bald mountain) was uninhabited until the 18th century. Originally, the mountain was called Sauberg (sow mountain) or Schweinsberg (pig mountain), after the numerous wild pigs that lived in the pristine oak forests. In 1628, Ferdinand II acquired the mountain from the Klosterneuburg monastery and called it Josephsberg (Joseph's Mountain). Only after Emperor Leopold I renamed the original Kahlenberg (the neighbouring mountain) to Leopoldsberg was the name "Kahlenberg" given to the "Josephsberg".

After acquiring the mountain, Ferdinand II allowed a hermitage for the Kamaldulenser, an order of Catholic hermits, to be built. A few houses were built around the Chapel of Saint Joseph, which earned the name Josefsdorf.

Jan III Sobieski, King of Poland launched his attack on the Turkish forces during the second Turkish Siege of Vienna from here. The Turkish name of the mountain is Alamandağı (German Mountain).

The mountain is also notable as the place where Albert Einstein, Otto Neurath, and other mathematicians and physicists made the first plans, around 1920, for what would later become the International Encyclopedia of Unified Science.

== Transportation ==
Kahlenberg can be reached by car or by bus (Bus line 38A) via the picturesque Höhenstraße, part of which is cobblestone. The first Austrian cog railway was built to Kahlenberg in 1872 and 1873 and opened in 1874. It was designed by Carl Maader. The track climbed 316 meters over 5.5 km and started from the train station in Nußdorf (today the end station of the tram-line D) and connected through Grinzing and Krapfenwaldl to the Kahlenberg Hotel, which opened in 1872. An average of 180,000 passengers used the train line each year. After World War I, the Vienna municipality converted the trams to electric power. The surrounding citizens had already dismantled large parts of the track during the war. On September 21, 1920, the line was finally shut down.

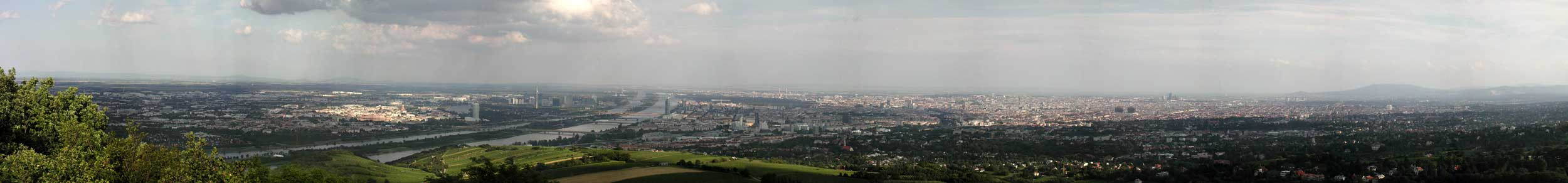
View of Vienna from Kahlenberg, 120° Panoramic View

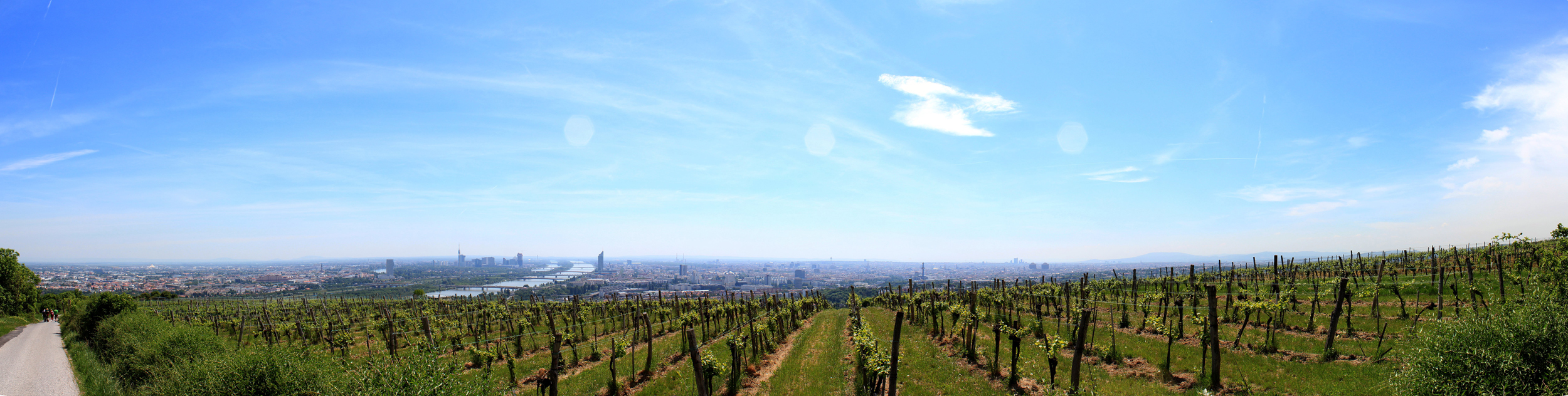
Panorama of Vienna, seen from Kahlenberg
