= Bisamberg =

- Municipality
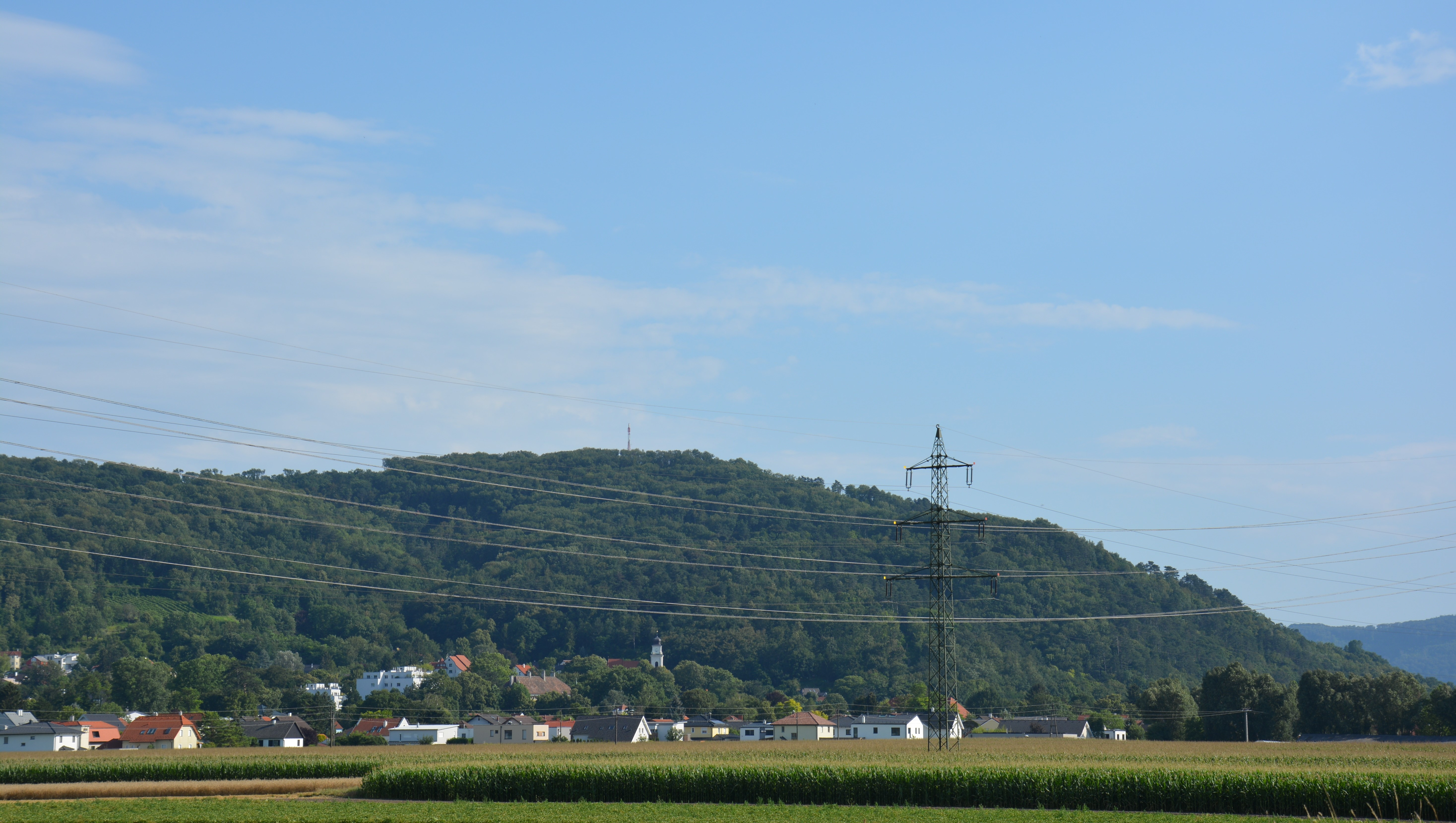

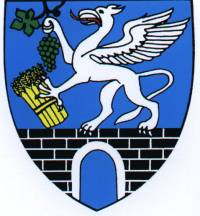
- Coat of arms

- Location within Austria
- Coordinates: 48°20′N 16°22′E
- Country: Austria
- State: Lower Austria
- District: Korneuburg

Government
  - Mayor: Günter Trettenhahn

Area
  - Total: 10.74 km^{2} (4.15 sq mi)
- Elevation: 192 m (630 ft)

Population (2018-01-01)
  - Total: 4,729
  - Density: 440.3/km^{2} (1,140/sq mi)
- Time zone: UTC+1 (CET)
  - Summer (DST): UTC+2 (CEST)
- Postal code: 2102
- Area code: 02262
- Website: www.bisamberg.at

Bisamberg is a municipality in the district of Korneuburg in Austria.

== Geography ==
It lies about 5 km northeast of Vienna in the Weinviertel in Lower Austria. About 24.43 percent of the municipality is forested.

The municipality includes the villages of Bisamberg and Klein-Engersdorf.
