= Donau City =

Neighbourhood of Vienna

Coordinates: 48.234°N 16.415°E

Donau City, seen from southwest

East view of Donau City and UNO City in Vienna

Donau City, or Vienna DC, is a new part of Vienna's 22nd District Donaustadt, next to both the Reichsbrücke and the left bank of the Danube's 21.1 km new channel, Neue Donau.

Construction work for the first building on this site, the Andromeda Tower, started in 1996.

== History ==
Although the Danube river has been inextricably connected with Vienna, for centuries, it had played only a subordinate role in the city of Vienna.

Unlike in many other cities, the Danube river, because of the numerous floods it regularly caused, was omitted from the urban area. Buildings grew up in Vienna on both sides of the Danube river – but not up to the Danube. Only after extensive flood-control engineering and the creation of the New Danube relief channel, with Danube Island, in the 1970s, was the surrounding cityscape of the Danube river of interest to builders.

The establishment of Donau City had its origins in the organization of the Vienna International Garden Festival in April 1964. This was on a site of a former landfill, later superficially rehabilitated, in an area between the Old Danube and the New Danube.

On October 12, 1962, the construction of the Danube Tower began, and two years later, the Garden Festival was held. The site of the garden show was known as Donaupark. Not far from Donaupark, in 1967, the planning of the UNO-City was started, opened in 1979. Through the construction of the U1 and the Reichsbruecke (Empire Bridge), the UN-City had a high-ranking access to the traffic system.

The terrain gained increasing importance with the opening of the congress center Austria Center Vienna in 1987. Next, at the end of the 1980s, there were plans to hold a Vienna-Budapest EXPO along the northern bank of the Danube river in Vienna. However, the planned EXPO 1995 was canceled because a majority of Viennese voters rejected it in a referendum on the project. The site was then developed for a subsequent use as a multifunctional district.

In 1991, the EXPO organizing corporation was succeeded by the Vienna Danube Region Development Corporation (WED), with major Austrian banks and insurance companies(BA-CA, Erste Bank, Raiffeisen Bank for Labor and Economy, Invest Bank AG, UNIQA, Wiener Städtische) as principal shareholders. WED owns the area and is responsible for its overall development. Within a few years, the district became a second urban center in Vienna, with residential and office buildings, research facilities, recreational facilities and event locations.

Work on the construction of infrastructure for future use began in 1993. The Danube Bank Motorway (A22) was roofed over, providing more area. The foundation for the first building was completed in 1995, with the start of construction of the Andromeda Tower.

The total area is 17.4 hectares. Of this total, approximately 1.7 million cubic meters are used for construction, which represents a gross floor area of approximately 500,000 square meters. Nearly two-thirds of those buildings are already completed and utilized.

== Gallery ==
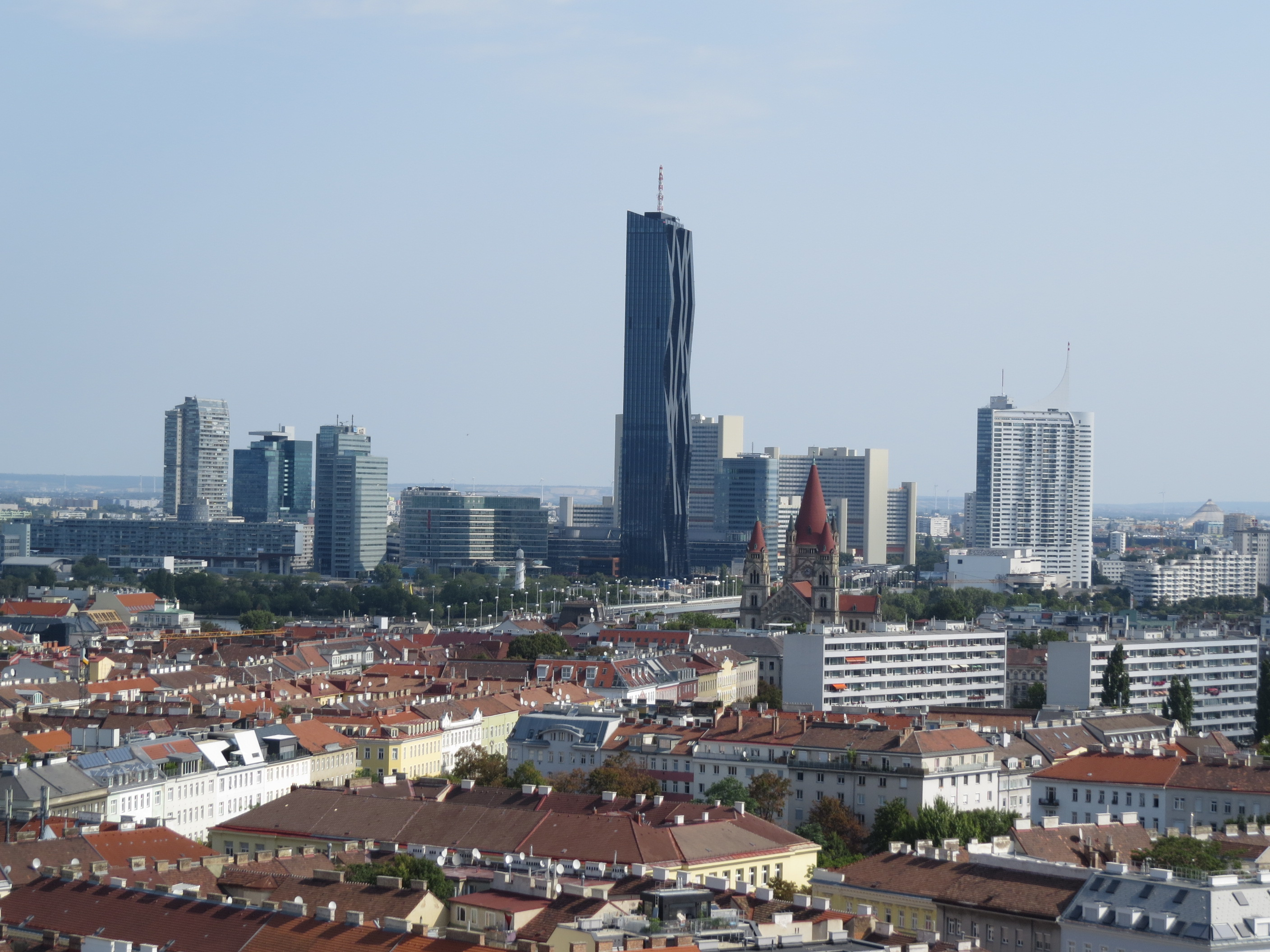
Overall view of Donau City

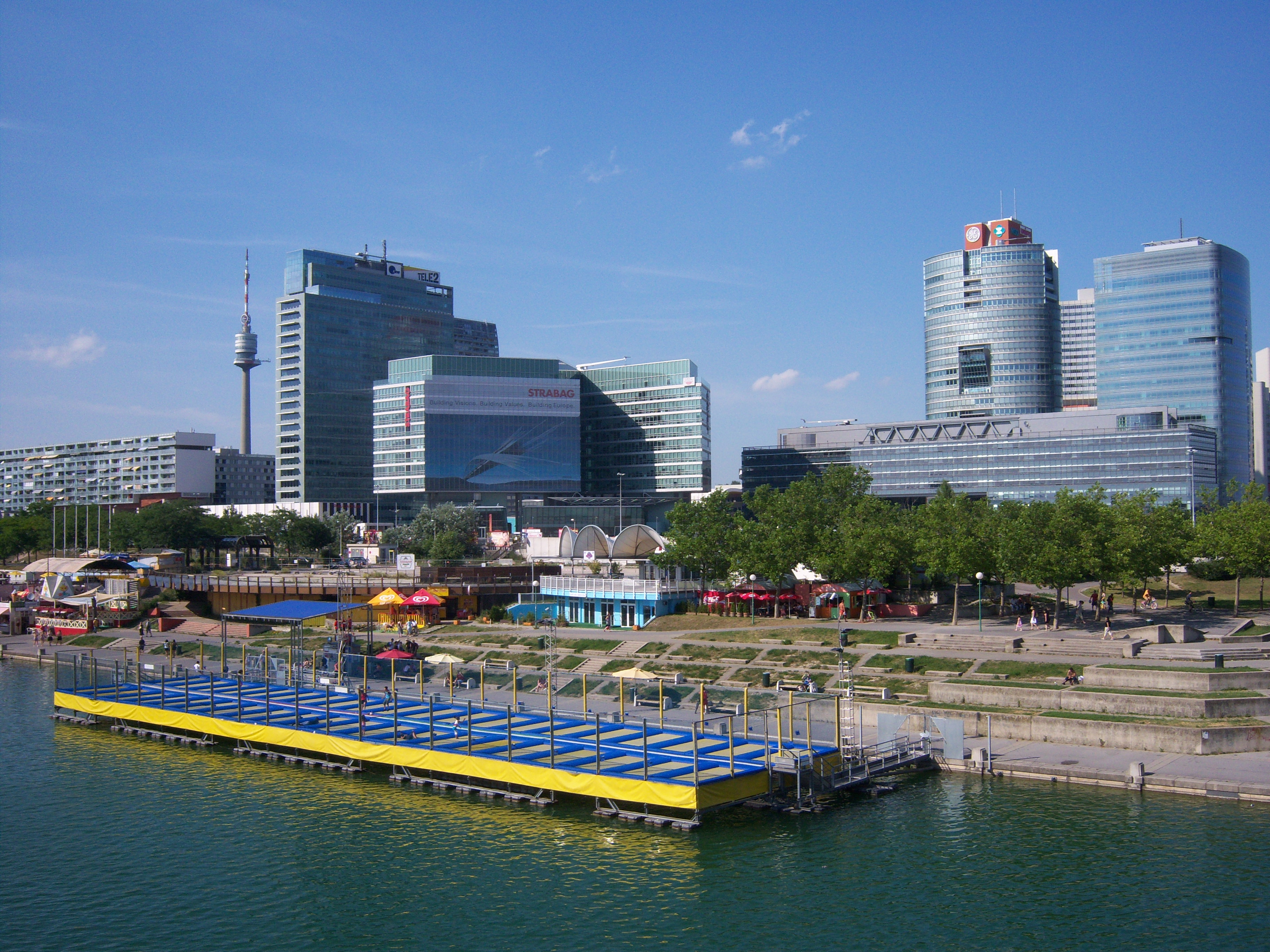
Vienna Donau City

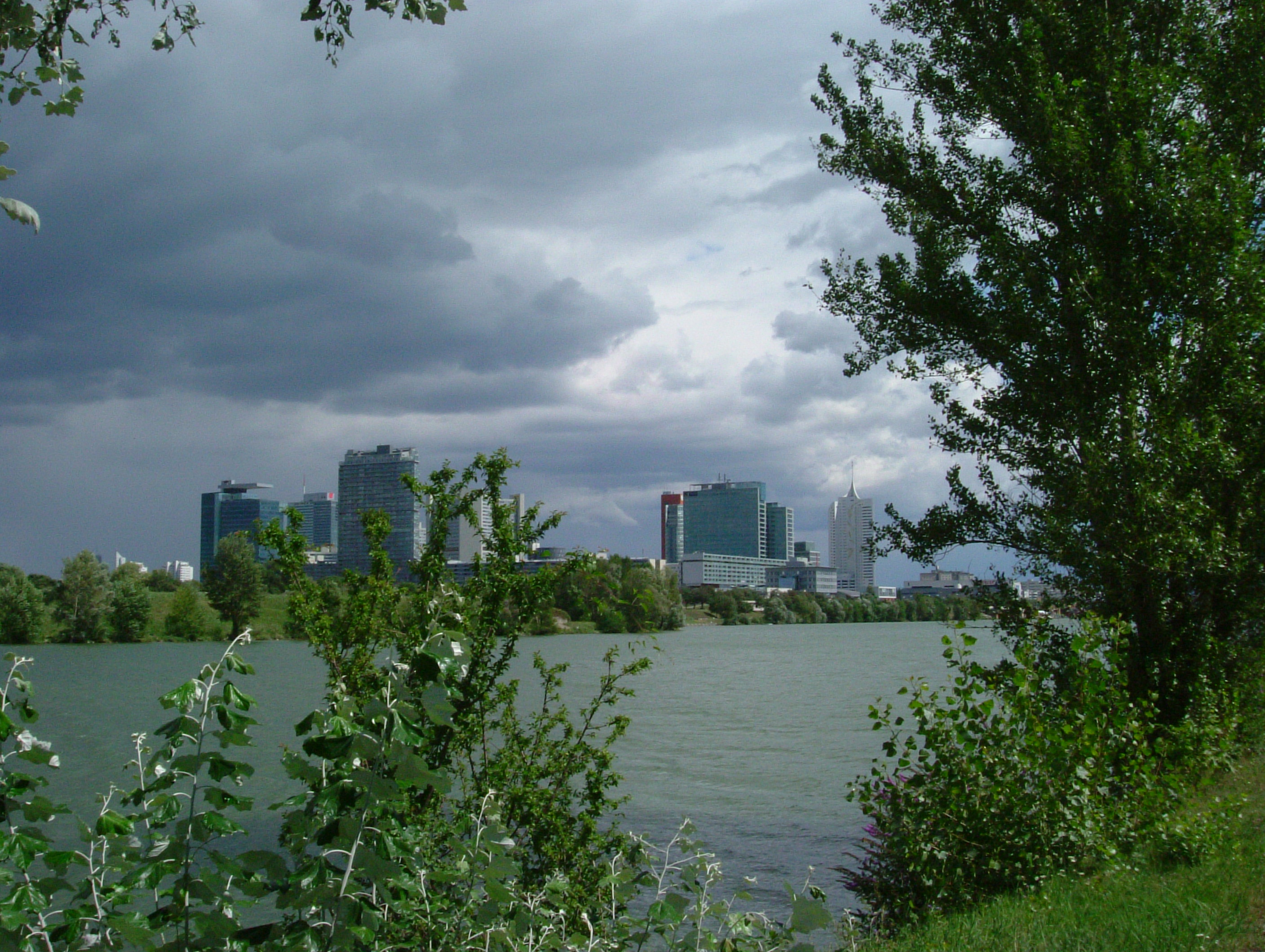
Donau City seen from the Donauinsel

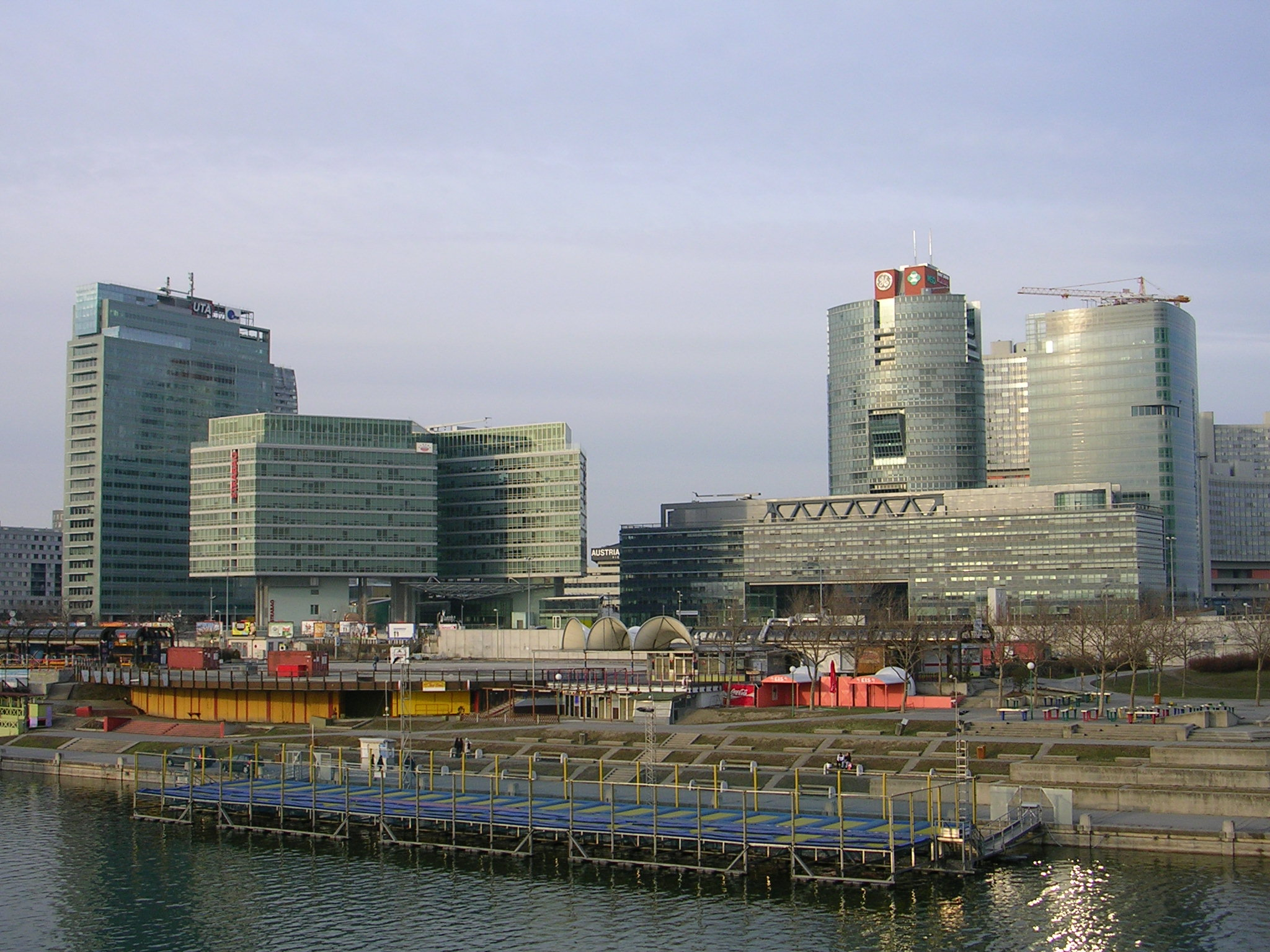
Donau City seen from the Reichsbrücke (left to right): Ares Tower, STRABAG Haus, Andromeda Tower, Tech Gate Vienna

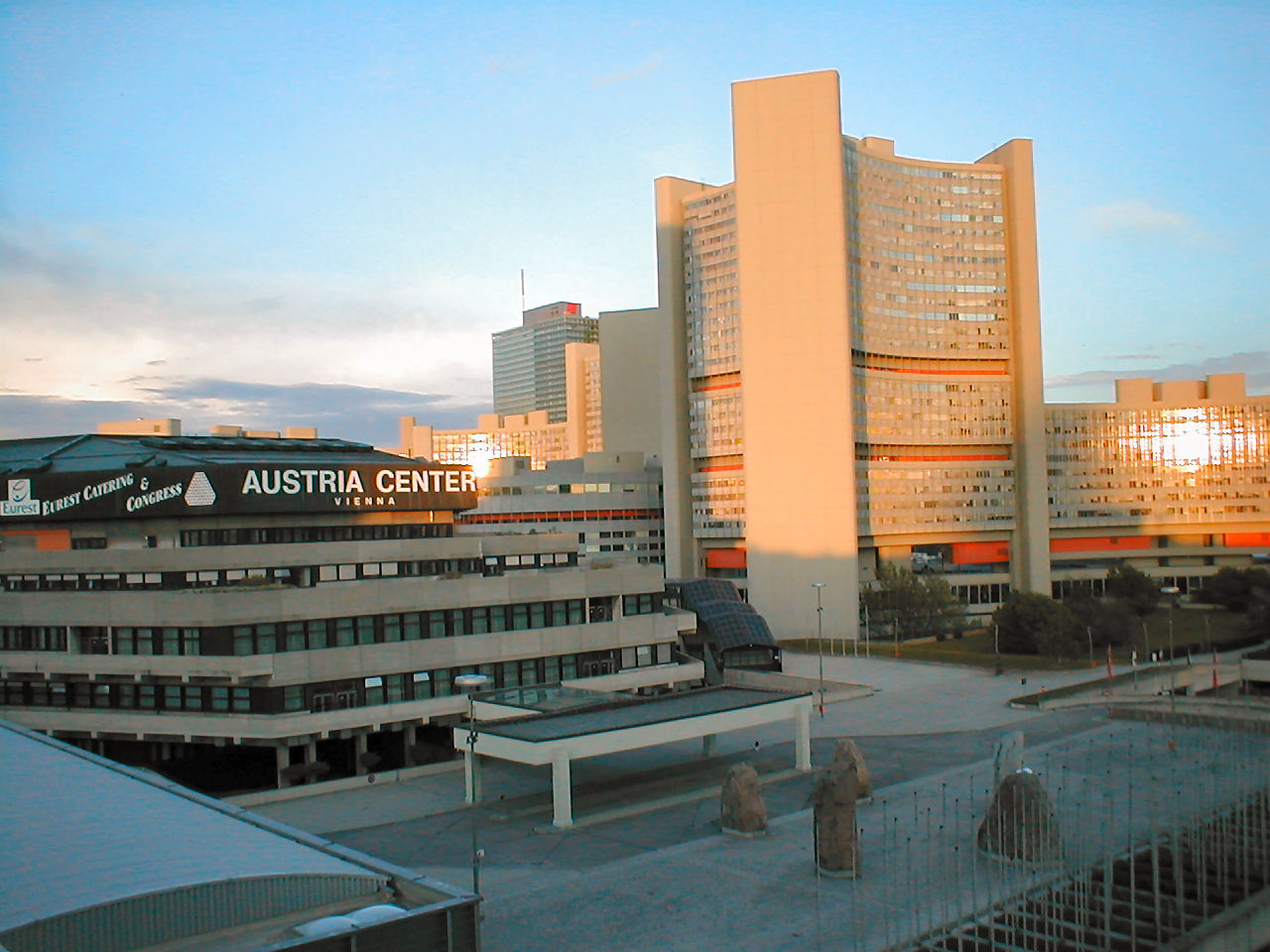
Austria Center Vienna with UNO-City

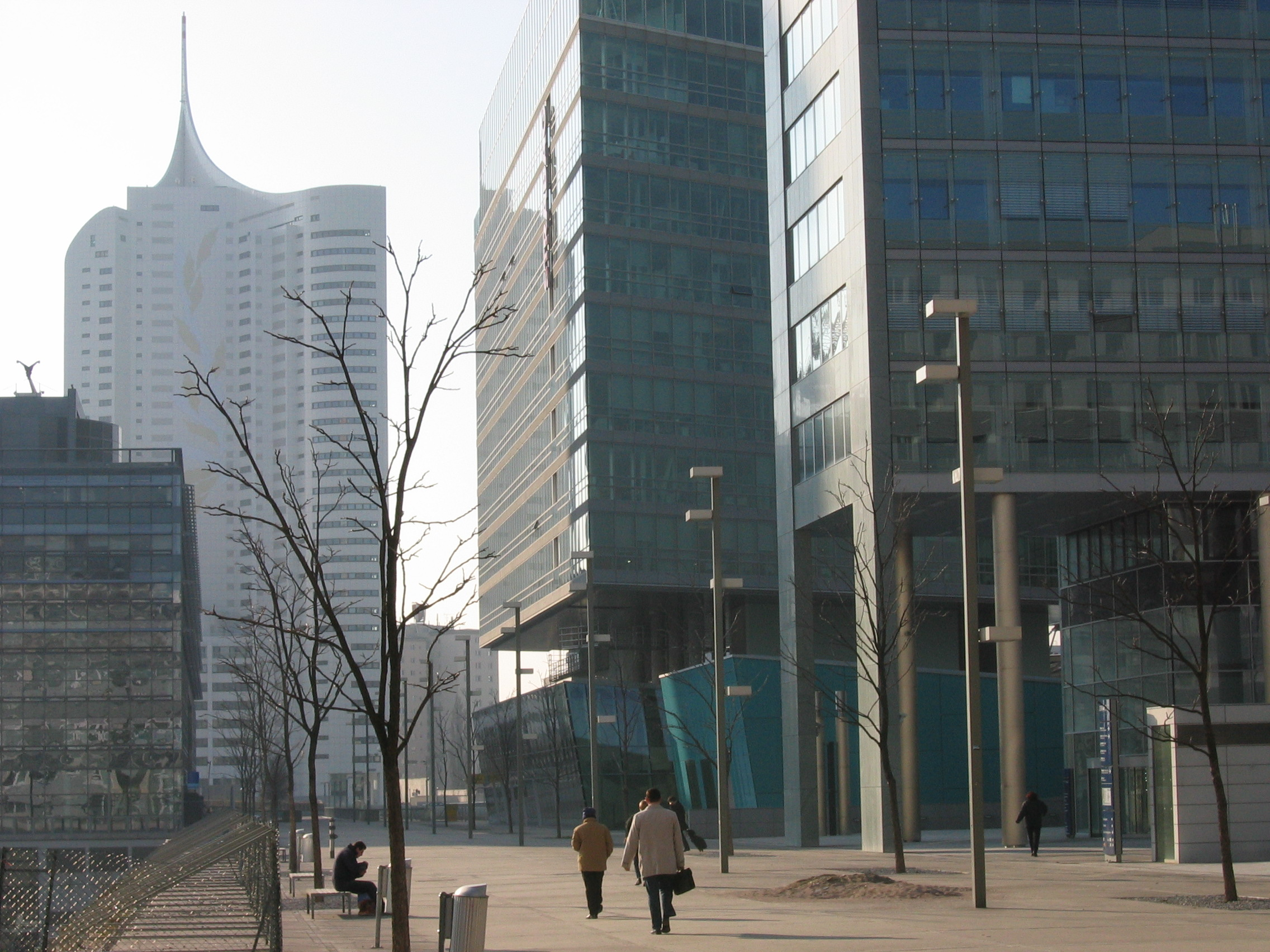
In Donau City

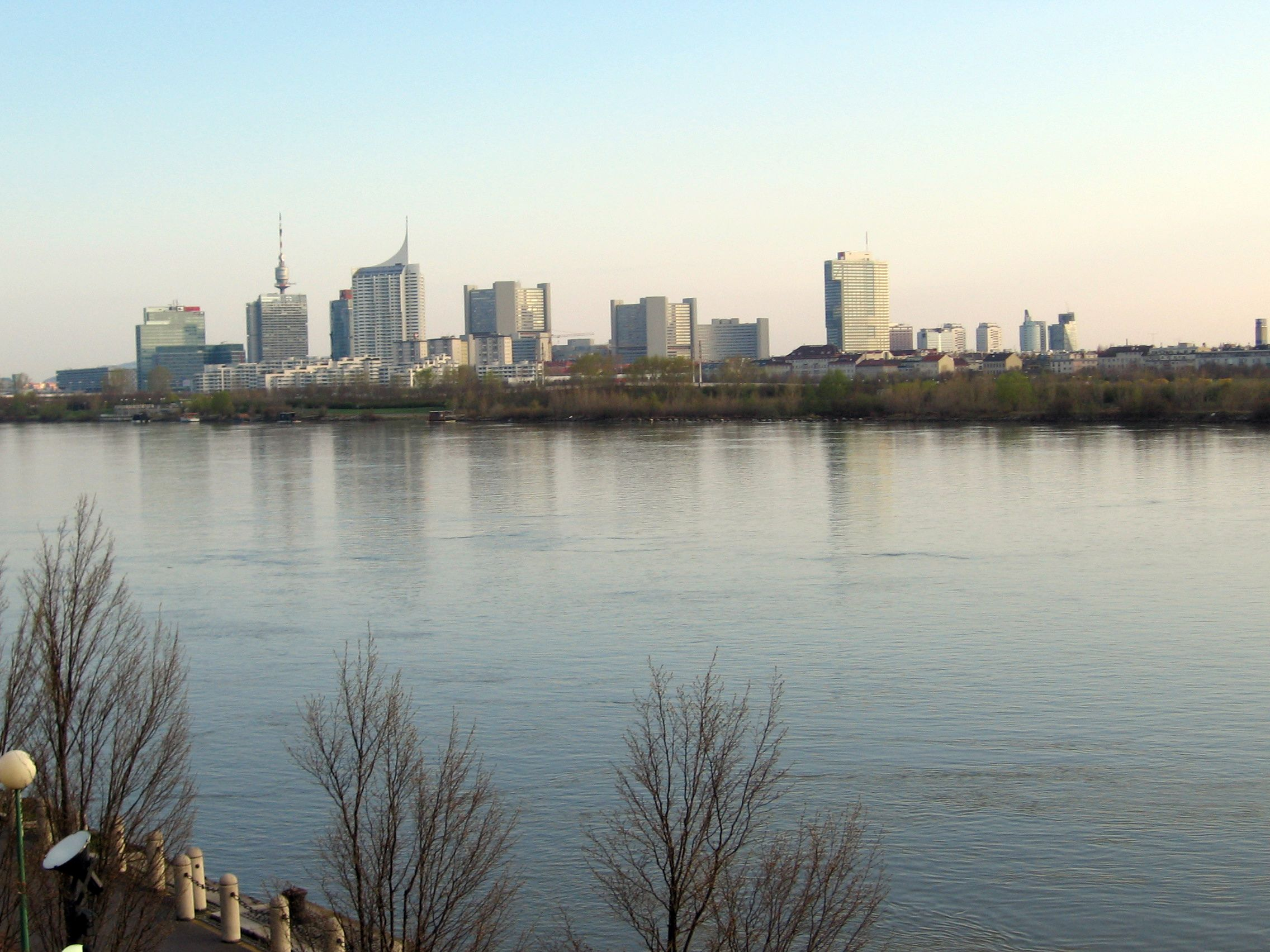
Donau City seen from opposite bank of the Danube

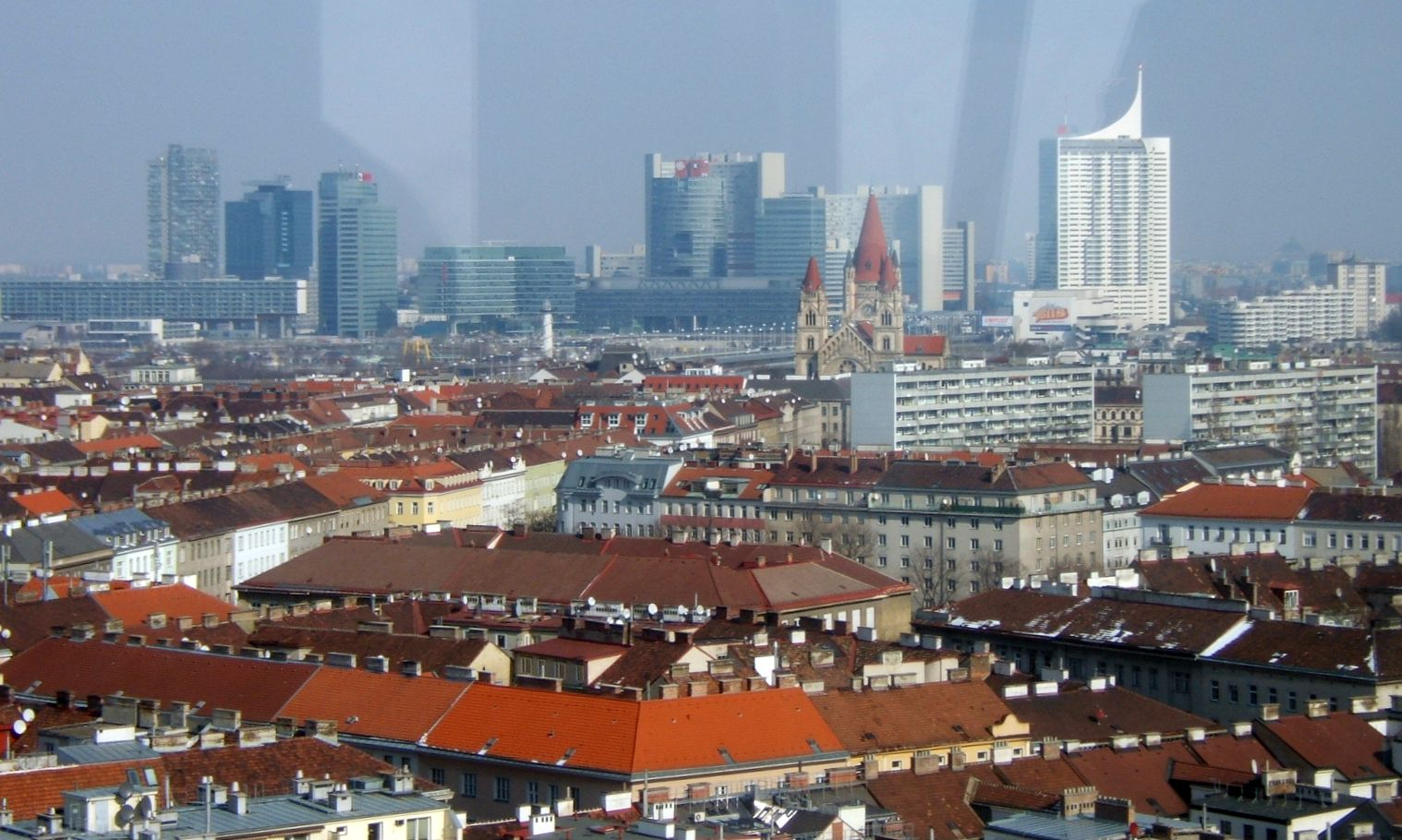
View of Donau City from the Wiener Riesenrad wheel

== Donau City concept ==
Following the cancellation of the EXPO in 1991, it was decided to evolve the still undeveloped area into the "Donau City", an urban centre with residential and office buildings, research facilities, recreational facilities and event locations.

The Donau City development concept provides for a broad mix of uses: office and commercial uses, up to 70 percent, residential use of about 20 percent, and cultural and recreational use of approximately 10 percent.

Approximately 7,500 people currently live and work in this new "city within a city". With the overall expansion, which is expected to be completed in 2012, the population could increase to 15,000. International companies such as IBM, sanofi-aventis and Bauholding Strabag SE are also located in Donau City. Also established are well-known high-tech companies that deal with their employees and scientific institutions in Vienna's first Science and Technology Park, Tech Gate Vienna.

In addition to the above institutions, Donau City has stores, restaurants, cafes, offices, a school and a church. The area bordering the Danube Island has recreation areas, Donaupark and Old Danube. Donau City has two direct connections to the motorway network, and the Vienna International Airport is about 20 minutes away.

== DC Towers ==
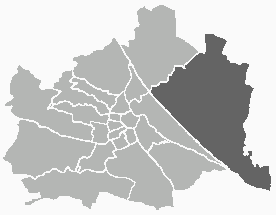
Location of Donau City in Vienna

In 2002, WED organized an international competition for a master plan to complete the remaining undeveloped third of the core area. The competition was won by French architect Dominique Perrault, who proposed two high-rise towers and a transition zone to the New Danube. The 60-story DC Tower 1, about 220 meters tall, will be Austria's tallest building. Together with the 46-story DC Tower 2, 160 meters tall, it will bring a new density to the district.

A third tower at 100 meters will complement the skyline. Construction is expected after the DC Towers in 5 years. Also planned are: a block of flats (about 50 meters high), a house of the cultures of about 70m, and a Sea Life Center over the covered motorway.

On October 2, 2012, S+B Gruppe and Sorovia Group jointly announced the construction of another high-rise called "Danube Flats". It will contain 500 flats distributed over 45 floors and 145 meters located next to the "Hochhaus Neue Donau". Overall the two developing companies will invest a total of €140 million in this project. Construction is scheduled to start in 2014 and end in 2016.

== Buildings ==
The construction of Donau City occurred in the following steps:

Building	Height		Start	Finish	Architect	Usage
Building	meters	feet	Start	Finish	Architect	Usage
Andromeda Tower	113	371	1996	1998	Wilhelm Holzbauer	offices
Volksschule			1996	1999	Hans Hollein	public school
Hochhaus Neue Donau mit Wohnpark Neue Donau	150	490	1999	2002	Harry Seidler	residences, daycare
IZD Tower	130	430	1998	2001	Thomas Feiger	offices
Mischek Tower	110	360	1998	2000	Elke Delugan-Meissl & Roman Delugan	residences
Donau City Church			1999	2000	Heinz Tesar	Catholic church
Tech Gate Vienna	75	246	1999	2005	Sepp Frank, Wilhelm Holzbauer	science and technology park
Ares Tower	100	330	1999	2001	Heinz Neumann	offices
STRABAG Haus	45	148	2001	2003	Ernst Hoffmann	offices
Saturn Tower	95	312	2003	2004	Heinz Neumann, Hans Hollein	offices
DC Tower 1	220	720	2010	2013	Dominique Perrault	offices, hotel, lofts
DC Tower 2	180	590	tba	2025	Dominique Perrault	offices, lofts
DC Tower 3	110	360	2020	2022	Dietrich Untertrifaller	student hostel
Danube Flats	175	574	tba	2024	project A01 architects	residences
