= Via donau =

Coordinates: 48.2326°N 16.4138°E

via donau - Österreichische Wasserstraßen-Gesellschaft mbH
- Type: GmbH
- Industry: Infrastructure, Transport
- Founded: 2005
- Headquarters: Vienna, Austria
- Key people: DI Hans-Peter Hasenbichler, Managing director
- Number of employees: ~ 270
- Website: http://www.via-donau.org

Former logo

Via Donau (sometimes stylized as viadonau) is a subsidiary of the Austrian Federal Ministry for Climate Action, Environment, Energy, Mobility, Innovation and Technology (BMVIT) tasked with the preservation and development of the Danube waterway. It was established in 2005.

== History ==
Via Donau was established on January 1, 2005, by the Ministry for Transport, Innovation, and Technology (BMVIT). It was formed by a merger of the Austrian Donau-Betriebs AG, the Austrian Danube-Technik GmbH, the Via Donau Development Company for Telematics and Navigation on the Danube, and the privatized waterways organization.

== Company ==
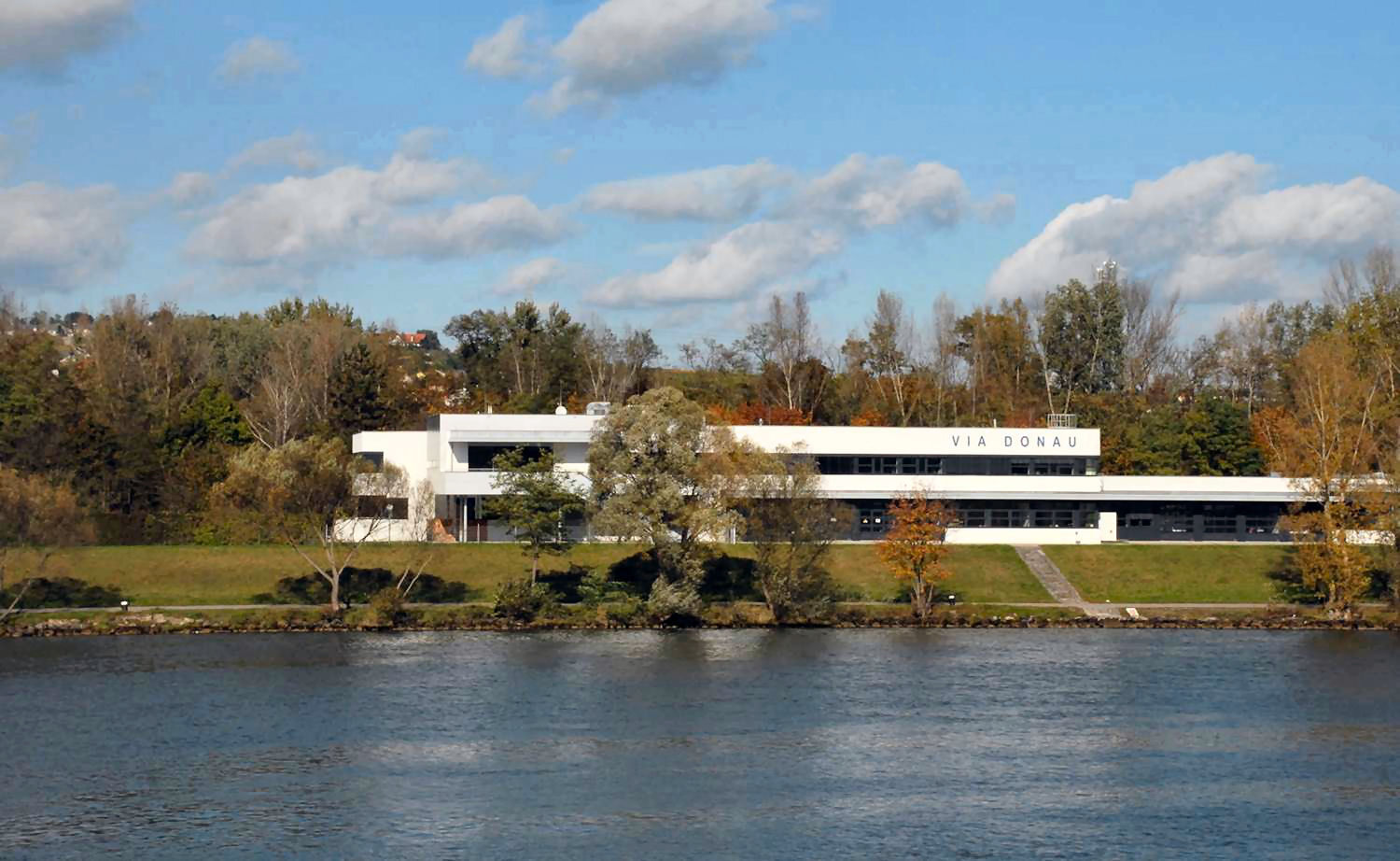
viadonau field office in Krems

Via Donau executes federal tasks in waterway and shipping. It has about 270 employees based at five locations, one main office, two field offices, and nine locks on the Danube.

== Locations ==
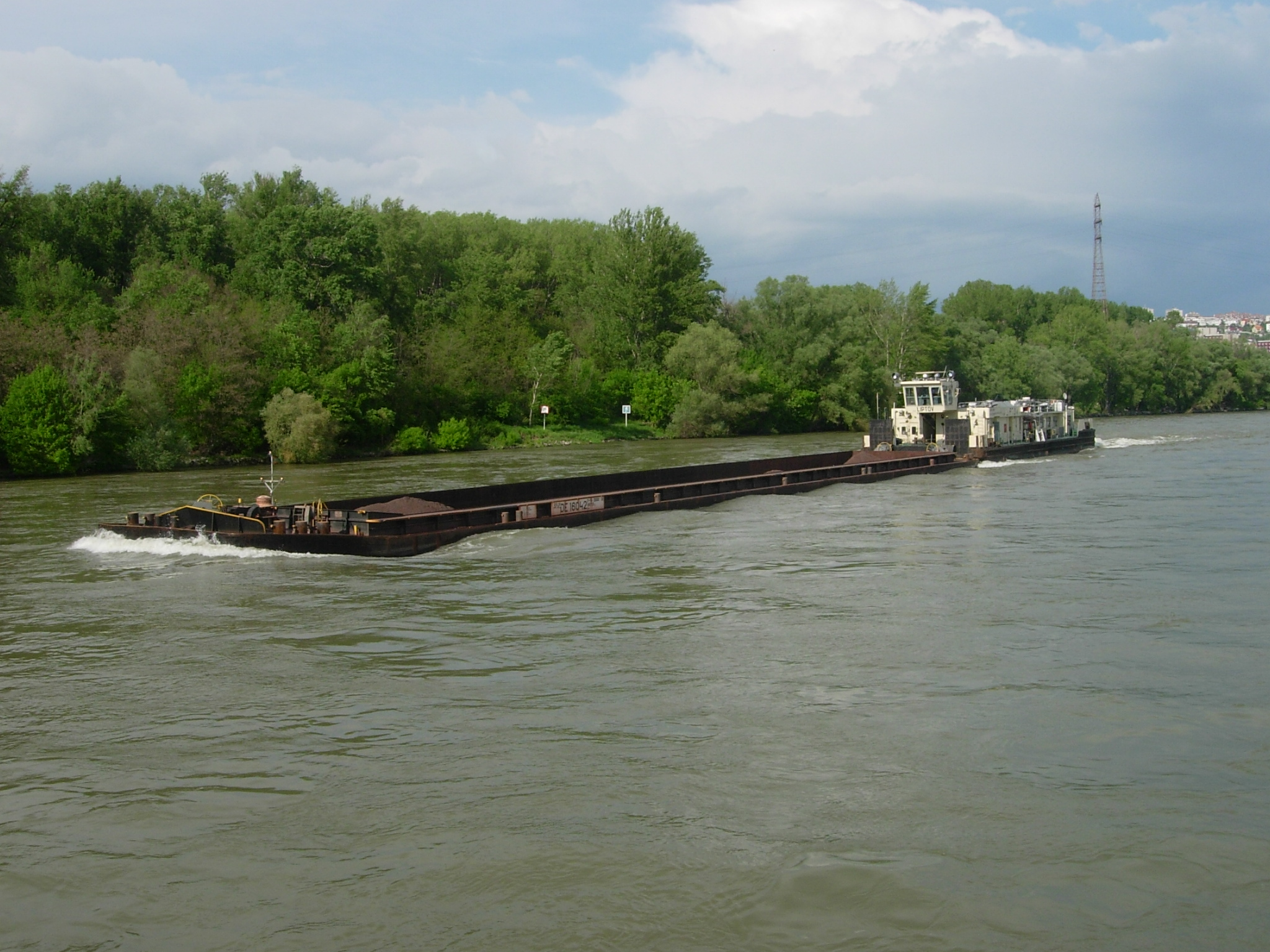
inland navigation on the Danube

Offices:

- Tech Gate Vienna (main office)
- Location Brigittenauer Sporn (Vienna)
- Location Angern (Lower Austria)
- Location West (Aschach, Upper Austria)
- Location Central including the field office Grein (Krems, Lower Austria)
- Location East (Bad Deutsch-Altenburg, Lower Austria)

Field office:

- Persenbeug (Lower Austria)

Locks on the Danube:

- Lock Nussdorf (Vienna)
- Lock management West (Abwinden, Aschach, Ottensheim)
- Lock management Centre (Melk, Persenbeug, Wallsee)
- Lock management (Altenwörth, Freudenau, Greifenstein)

== Tasks ==
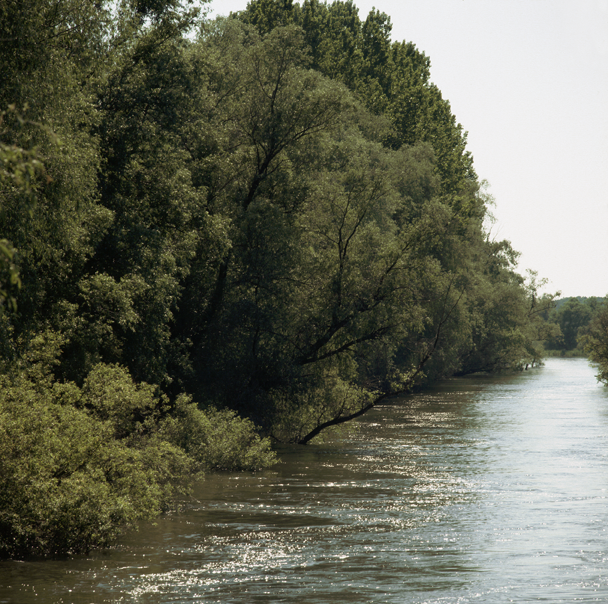
Danube river bank

Infrastructure management

Via Donau is tasked with the maintenance of riverbanks and bank constructions, the upkeep of shipping routes, and the current measurement and appropriation of hydrographic and hydrologic data.

Flood protection

Via Donau is responsible for the establishment and maintenance of flood protection facilities on the Morava, Thaya, and Danube rivers. Via Donau is also responsible for the current largest flood protection project on the Morava and lower Thaya rivers. As the managing office of the Danube Flood Control Agency (DHK), Via Donau is responsible for preventive and protective measures concerning the DHK's flood control structures in Vienna and Lower Austria.

Ecological Measures on the Danube

The company also conducts numerous river engineering and re-naturalization projects. The re-naturalization of the Danube is creating near-natural riverbanks and new habitats for animals and plants.

Traffic management on the Austrian Danube

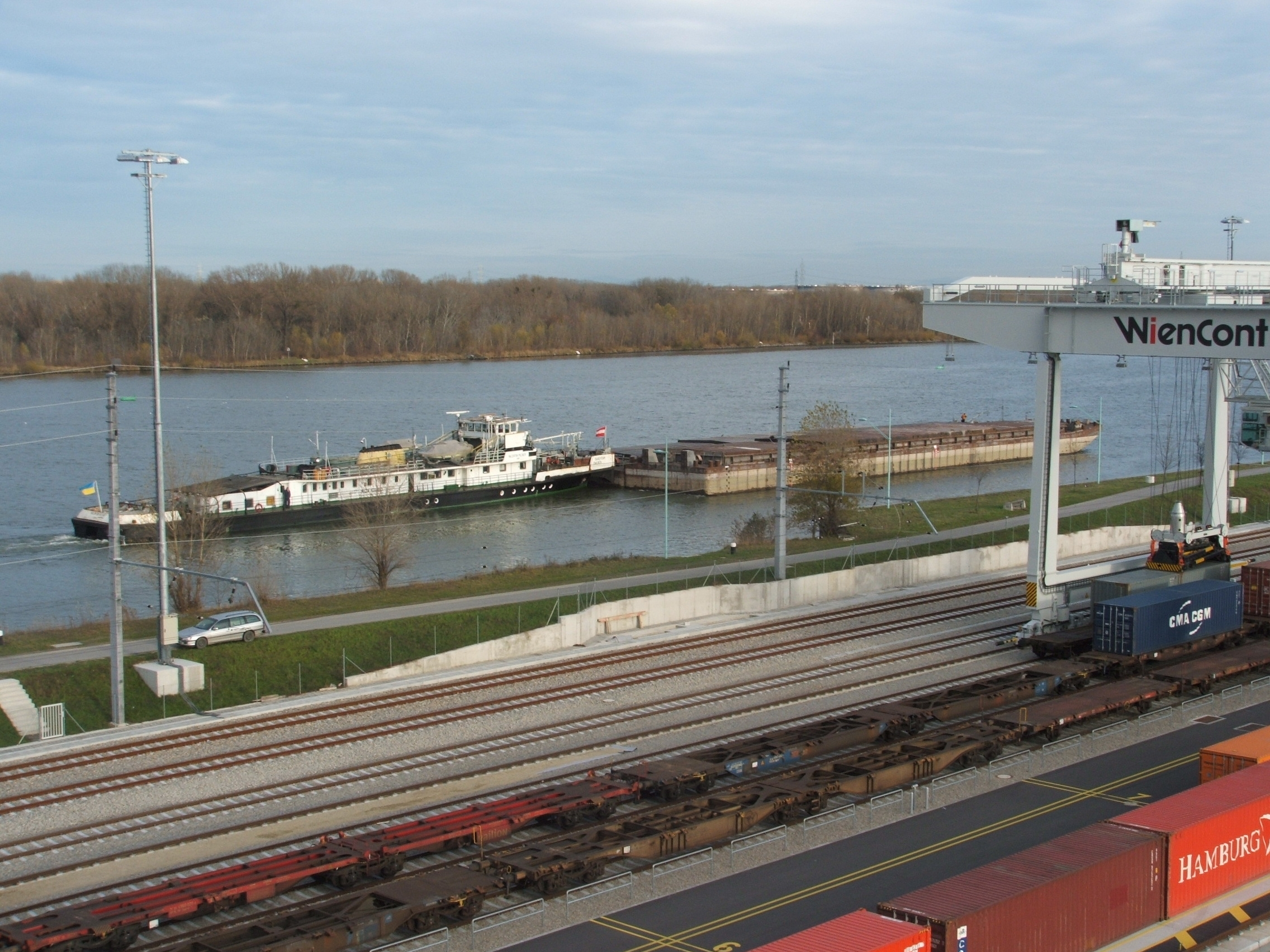
cargo vessel on the Danube

Along with DoRIS (Danube River Information Services), Via Donau has participated in the development of a decisive tool for inland waterway transport on the Austrian Danube. In 2006, DoRIS commenced operations and had set the standard for navigation information systems all along the Danube. In addition, Via Donau supports the implementation of River Information Services in the entire Danube region.

Developing and strengthening inland waterway transport

In 2005, the “National Danube Shipping Action Plan” (NAP) came into effect in Austria, where around 70 individual measures were defined for strengthening and developing shipping. The NAP was given substantial support during its development by Via Donau, and defines many aspects of future Austrian shipping policy.
