= Tech Gate Vienna =

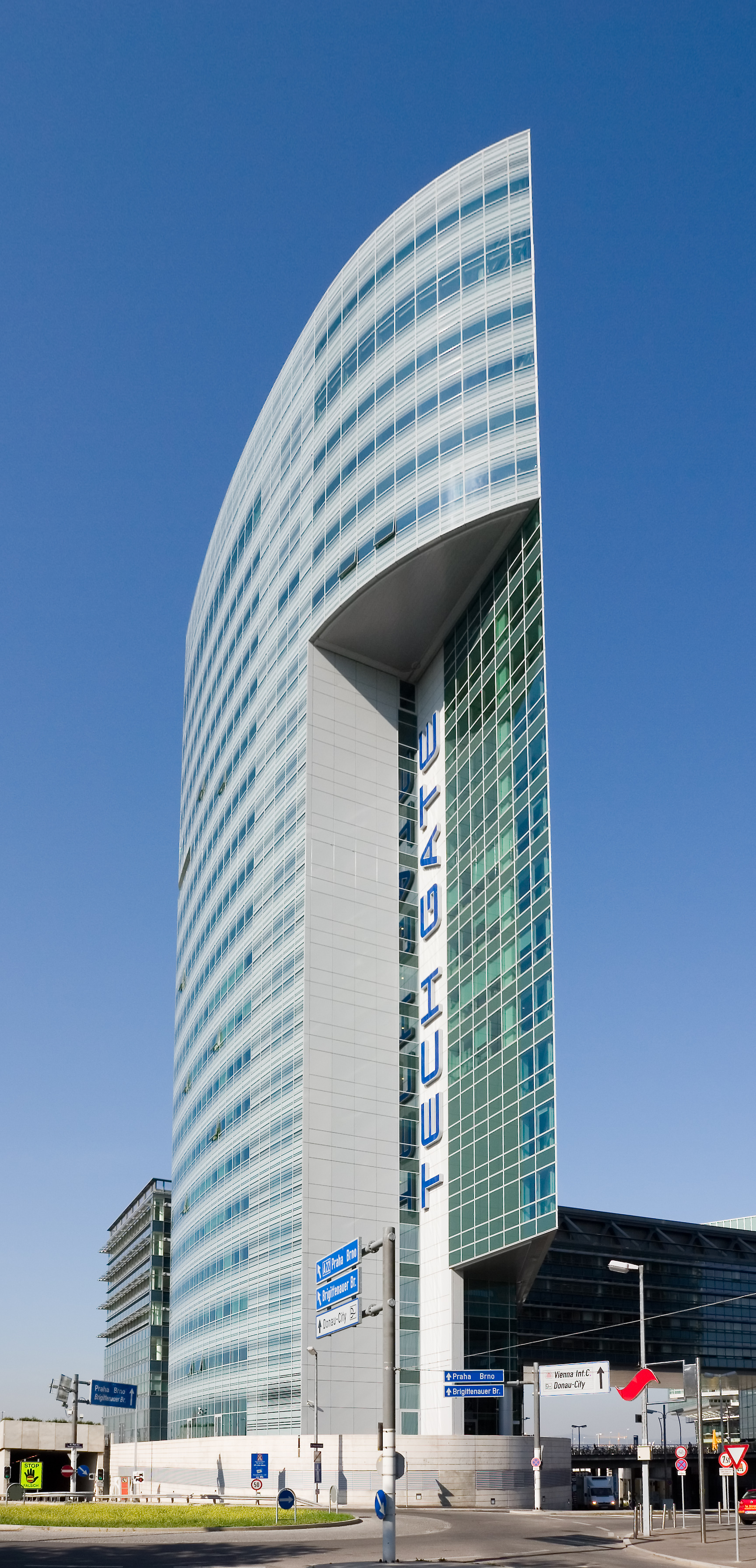
- Interactive map of the Tech Gate Vienna area

General information
- Coordinates: 48°13′56″N 16°24′51″E

Tech Gate Vienna is a science and technology park in the City of Vienna, Austria, situated in the 22nd district Donaustadt. It was built between 1999 and 2005 following the plans from architects Wilhelm Holzbauer and Sepp Frank in an area called Donau City.

Tech Gate Vienna consists of two buildings. The first, 26 meter high building was completed in 2001 and has 7 floors, with a total of 36,000 square meters of room. The second building was built from 2004 to 2005 and is 75 meters high with 18,000 square meters of room on 19 floors.

Aside many companies and start-ups, several technology labs are situated in Tech Gate Vienna buildings, such as the Austrian Institute of Technology, the Telecommunications Research Center Vienna (FTW), and the VRVis Research Center. Four attractive stages are utilized for a variety of technology affine events.
