= IZD Tower =

Skyscraper in Vienna, Austria

- IZD Turm (German)
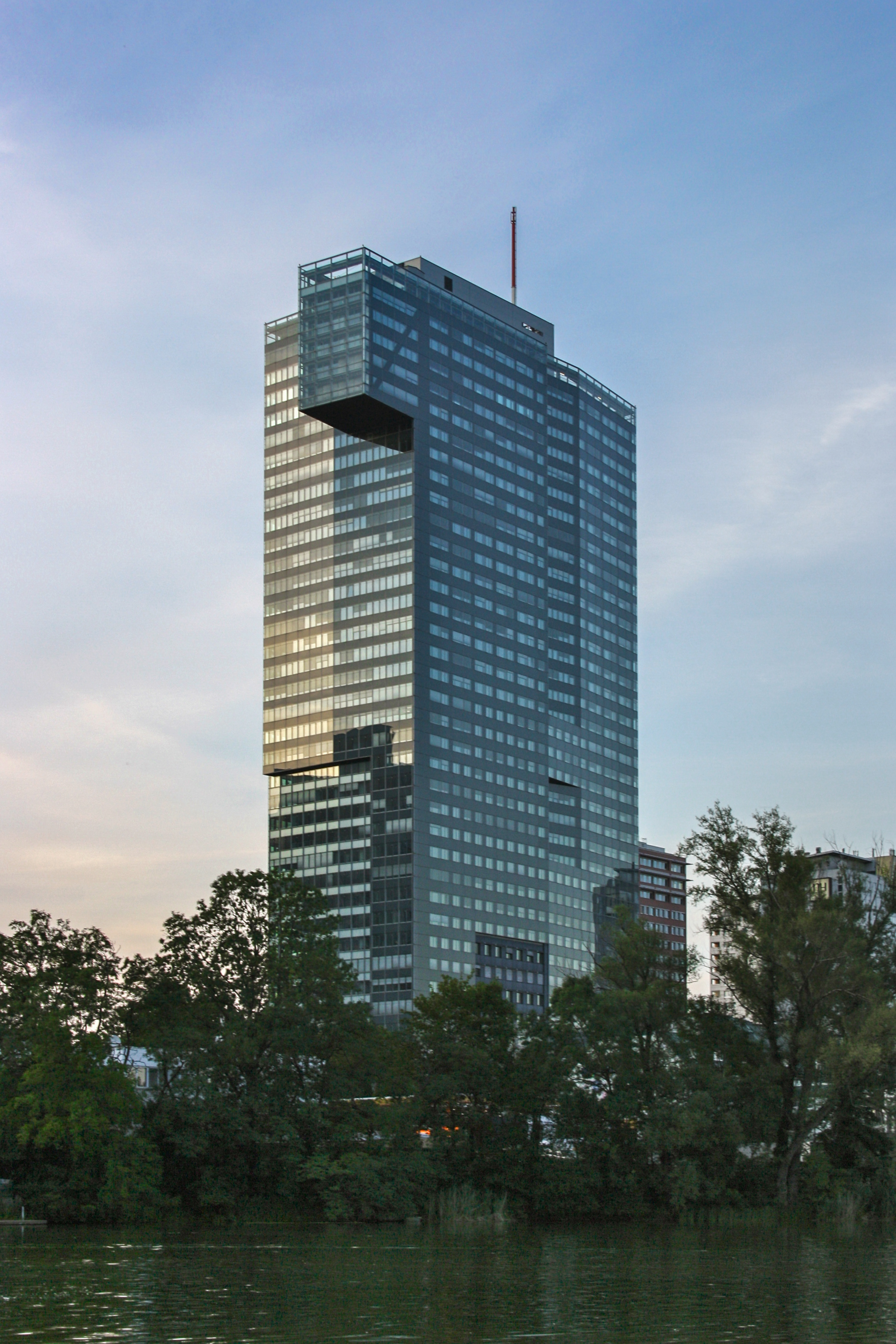

General information
- Status: Completed
- Type: Office
- Location: Vienna, Austria, 19 Wagramer Str., Vienna, Austria
- Coordinates: 48.23477°N 16.42087°E
- Construction started: 1998
- Completed: 2001
- Owner: Matrix Property Fund Management LLP

Height
- Roof: 162 m (531 ft)

Technical details
- Structural system: Concrete
- Floor count: 37
- Floor area: 63,520 m^{2} (684,000 sq ft)
- Lifts/elevators: 14

Design and construction
- Architects: NFOG (Nigst, Fonatti, Ostertag & Gaisrucker)
- Structural engineer: Doka GmbH (framework)
- Main contractor: Porr

The IZD Tower (German: IZD Turm) is a high-rise office building in the Donau City district of Vienna, Austria. Built between 1998 ad 2001, the tower stands at 162 m (531 ft) tall with 37 floors and is the current third tallest building in Austria.

== History ==
=== Architecture ===
The design and building permit for the 150 meter high building were provided by the architectural partnership NFOG (Nigst, Fonatti, Ostertag, Gaisrucker). Architect Thomas Feiger was responsible for the overall planning and construction management. Construction began in 1998 and the building was completed around three years later. It is used by rental offices; tenants of the IZD Tower include Ernst & Young, Huawei, Estée Lauder Cosmetics GmbH, easyJet Europe Airline GmbH and Austrian Power Grid AG . The total rental space on 42 floors is 63,530 m^{2}. The highest floor is 130 m above ground level; the roof height is 137 m. The IZD Tower is one of the tallest buildings in Vienna.

In 2006, the British real estate fund Matrix Securities acquired the building from the investment firm Doughty Hanson & Co for 244 million euros. In 2010, Signa took over the skyscraper.

The US representation to the United Nations is located on the top floor of the IZD Tower. In the wake of the surveillance and espionage scandal in 2013, suspicions arose that a National Security Agency (NSA) listening post was located there, which could observe the UNO City, which is only 40 meters away. In September 2014, photos were leaked to the press showing special structures on the roof of the tower.

The IZD Tower Staircase Run has been held every year in September since 2005. Depending on the accessibility of the top floors, participants run up to the 34th or 35th floor, which corresponds to around 630 steps. The current record time (2014) is 3:07.20 minutes.

== Gallery ==
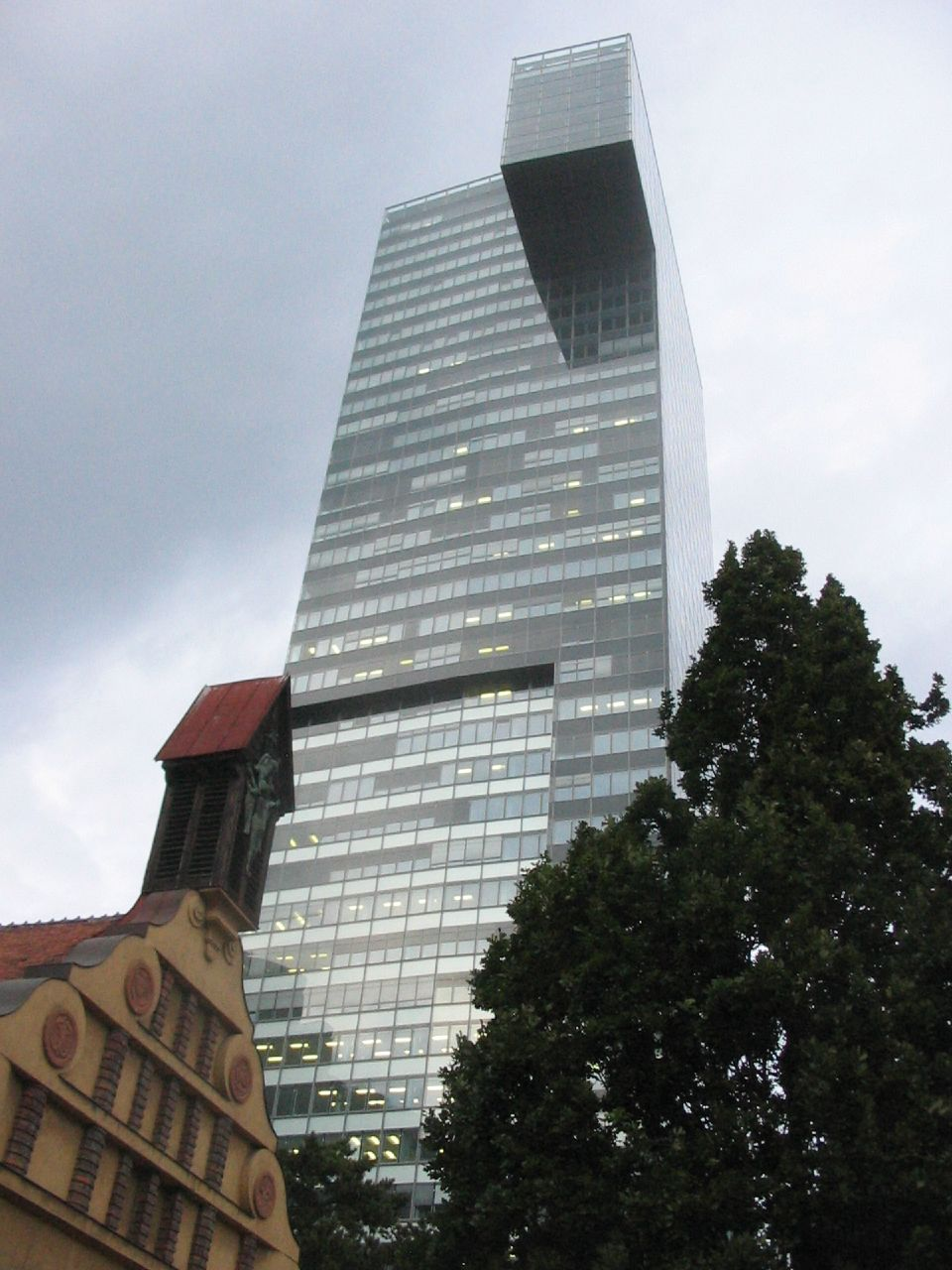
The IZD Tower from level ground

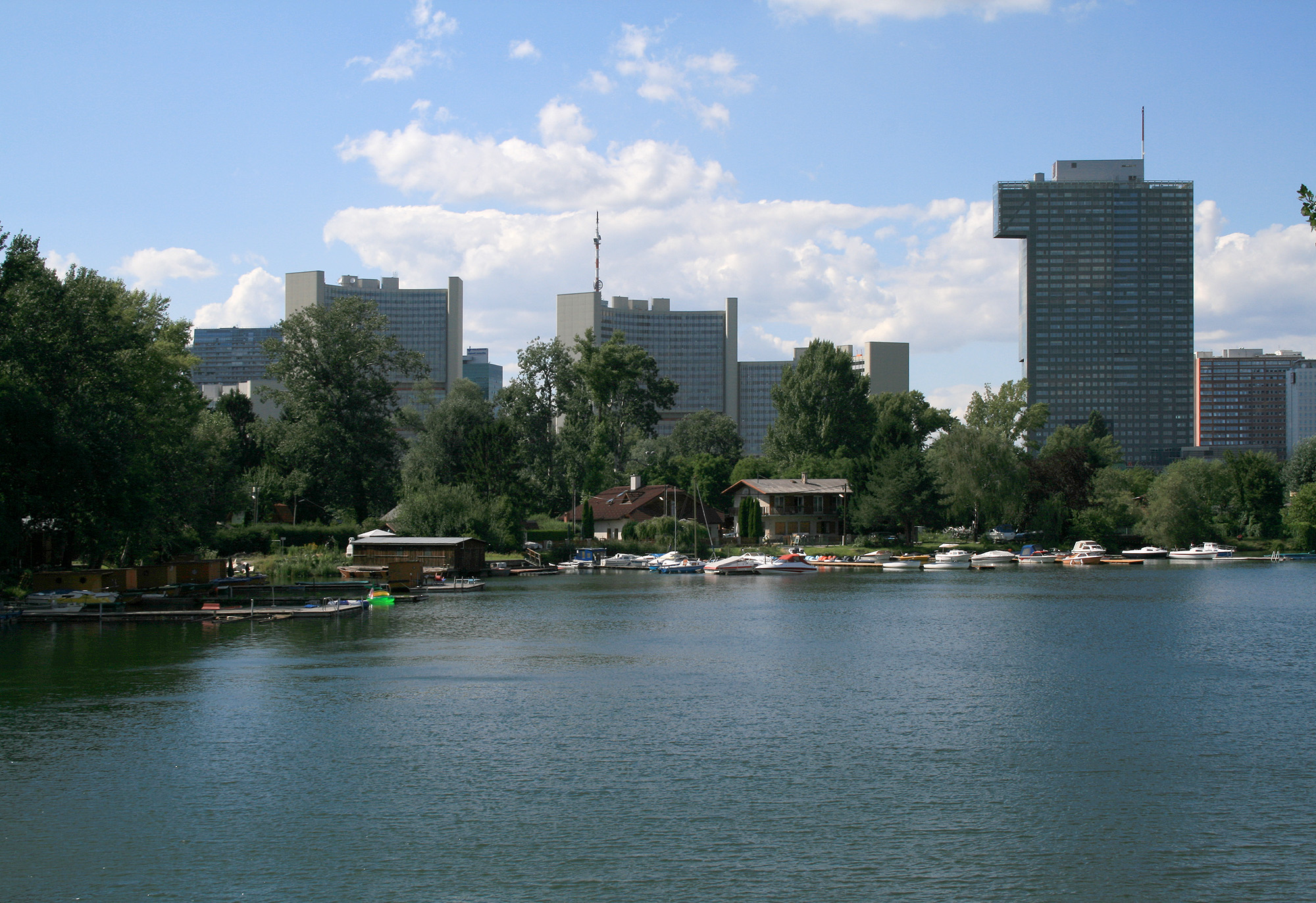
On the right the IZD Tower, on the left the buildings of the UNO City

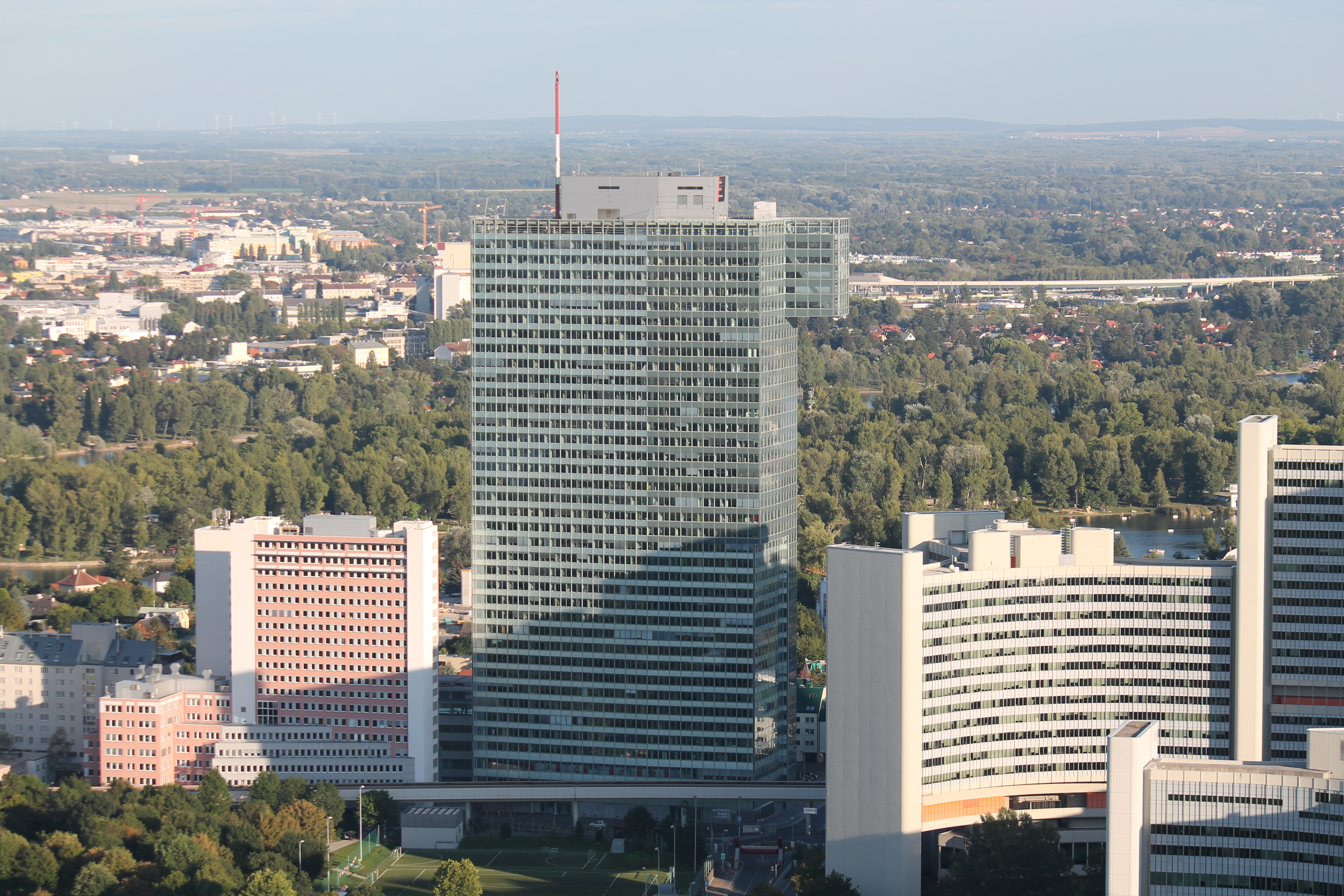
view from the Danube Tower

== See also ==
- List of tallest buildings in Austria
- List of tallest buildings in Vienna
