= Heinz Tesar =

Austrian architect (1939–2024)

Heinz Tesar (16 June 1939 – 18 January 2024) was an Austrian architect who had an international reputation for his church and museum architecture.

== Life and career ==
Tesar studied architecture from 1961 to 1965 at the Akademie der bildenden Künste in the master class of Roland Rainer. After several stays in Hamburg (1959–1961), Munich (1965–1968) and Amsterdam (1971), he opened, in 1973, his own studio in Vienna. From 1972 to 1977 he was a member of the Board of the Austrian Society for Architecture and from 2002 to 2006 he was a member of the Baukollegium of the city of Zurich. In 2000 he opened an office in Berlin. Tesar died on 18 January 2024, at the age of 84, in Baden bei Wien.

=== Academic career ===
From the 1980s, he taught at various universities in Europe and America:

- 1983 Visiting Professor at Cornell University in Ithaca, New York
- 1985–1987 Visiting Professor at the ETH Zurich
- 1988 Visiting Professor at Syracuse University, New York
- 1990 Visiting Professor Graduate School of Design, Harvard University, Cambridge, Massachusetts
- 1990–1991 Visiting Professor at the Technical University of Munich
- 1992 Cass Gilbert Visiting Professor, University of Minnesota, Minneapolis
- 1995 International Summer Academy in Salzburg
- 1996–2000 Visiting Professor Istituto Universitario di Architettura di Venezia
- 1997–1998 Visiting Professor University of Fine Arts Hamburg
- 2000–2006 Visiting Professor Accademia di Architettura, University of Italian Switzerland, Mendrisio

== Design competitions ==
For various international competition entries he received the first or second prize: e.g. for Klösterliareal in Bern (1981), the University Library in Amiens (1991), the Synagogue in Dresden (1997), the Museum for Art and Design in Ingolstadt (2000) and the Museum of Medicine in Padua, Italy (2004).

== Notable buildings ==
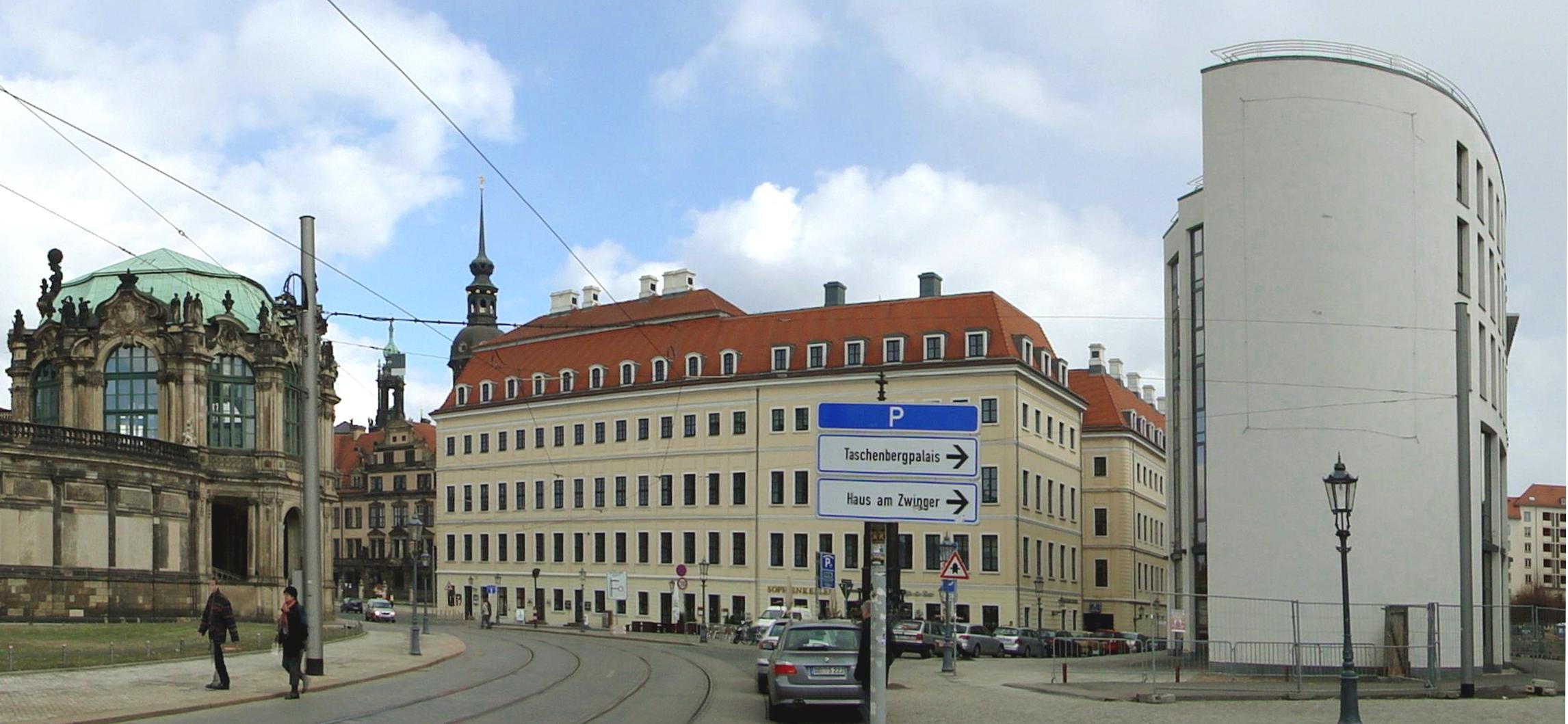
Dresden: Haus am Zwinger (right) & Taschenberg Palace (left)

- 1974–77 Music Studio, Steinach am Brenner
- 1976–78 Unternberg Parish church.
- 1977–86 Church and Cemetery, Wagrain
- 1976–83, 1985–88 Residential Development, Vienna,
- 1981–83 Firestation Perchtoldsdorf.
- 1981–83 Haus Grass Bregenz.
- 1981–85 Biberhaufenweg settlement, Vienna, (with Carl Pruscha and Otto Häuselmayer)
- 1985–87 House Grobecker, Vienna,
- 1986–87 Administration building Schömer, Klosterneuburg,
- 1987–90 Day-care, residential complex Wienerberggründe, Vienna.
- 1991 Design Koloman Walisch Square, Kapfenberg.
- 1993–95 Keltenmuseum in Hallein
- 1994 Stadttheater / cinema and museum, Hallein, (the conversion of Wunibald Deininger building which was erected in 1925 – Deininger was a student of Otto Wagner)
- 1995 Evangelical Church, Klosterneuburg. [3]
- 1995 Warehouse area, St. Gallen Styria,
- 1995 ″Taschenberg Residence″ (Haus am Zwinger next to Taschenberg Palace), Dresden
- 1998–99 Essl Collection Museum Klosterneuburg
- 1999 Donau City Church of Christ, hope of the world in the Danube City Vienna.
- 1999 Haus am Zwinger, Dresden
- 2000–05 Conversion Bode Museum Kaiser Friedrich Museum, Berlin,
- 2001–06 Teichgartencalvario, Klosterneuburg near Vienna,
- 2001–06 BTV City Forum, Innsbruck,
- 2007–08 Auditorium, Institute of Science and Technology Austria (ISTA), Klosterneuburg
- 2013 Conversion of Kahlsperg Castle for the Franciscan Sisters of Hallein [2]
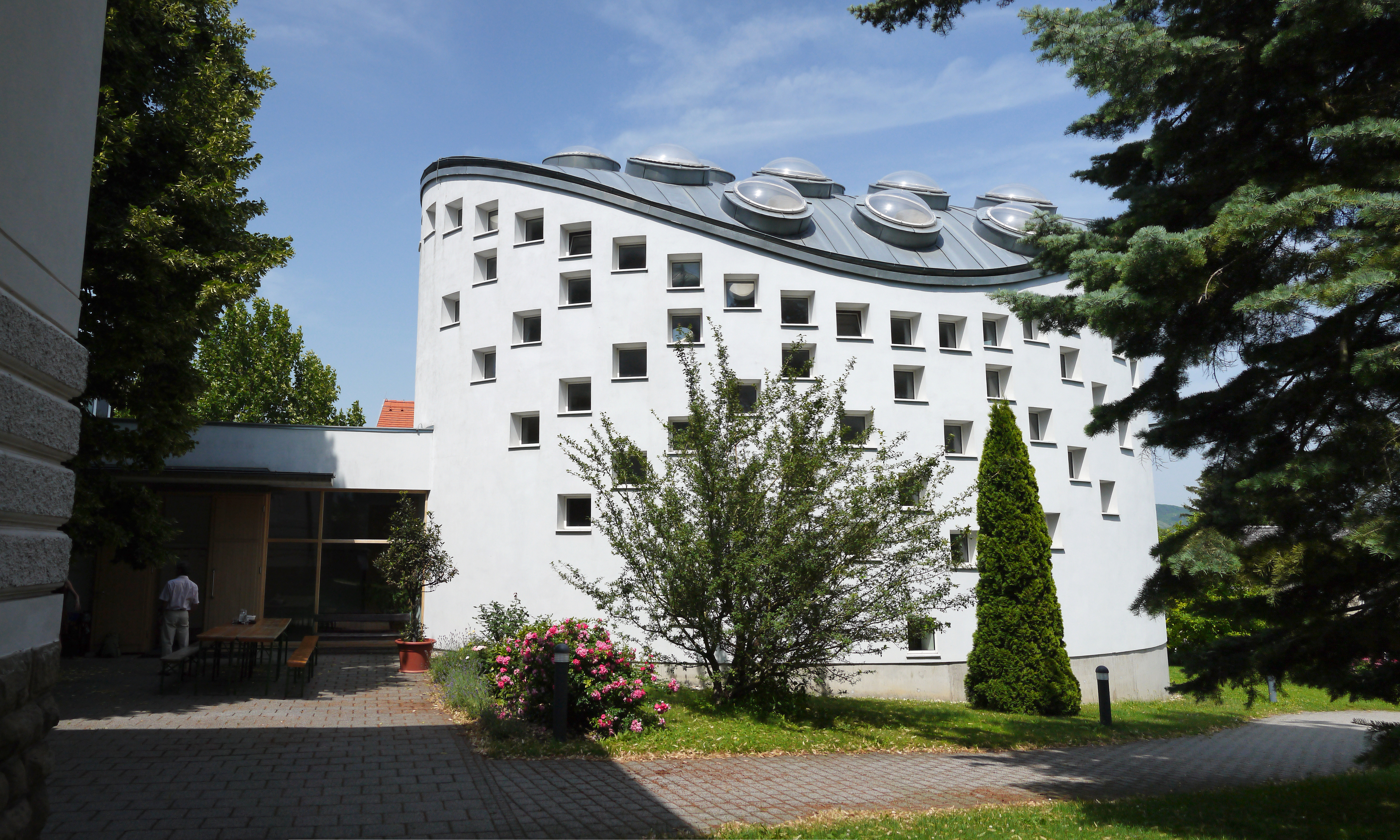
Klosterneuburg evangelic church

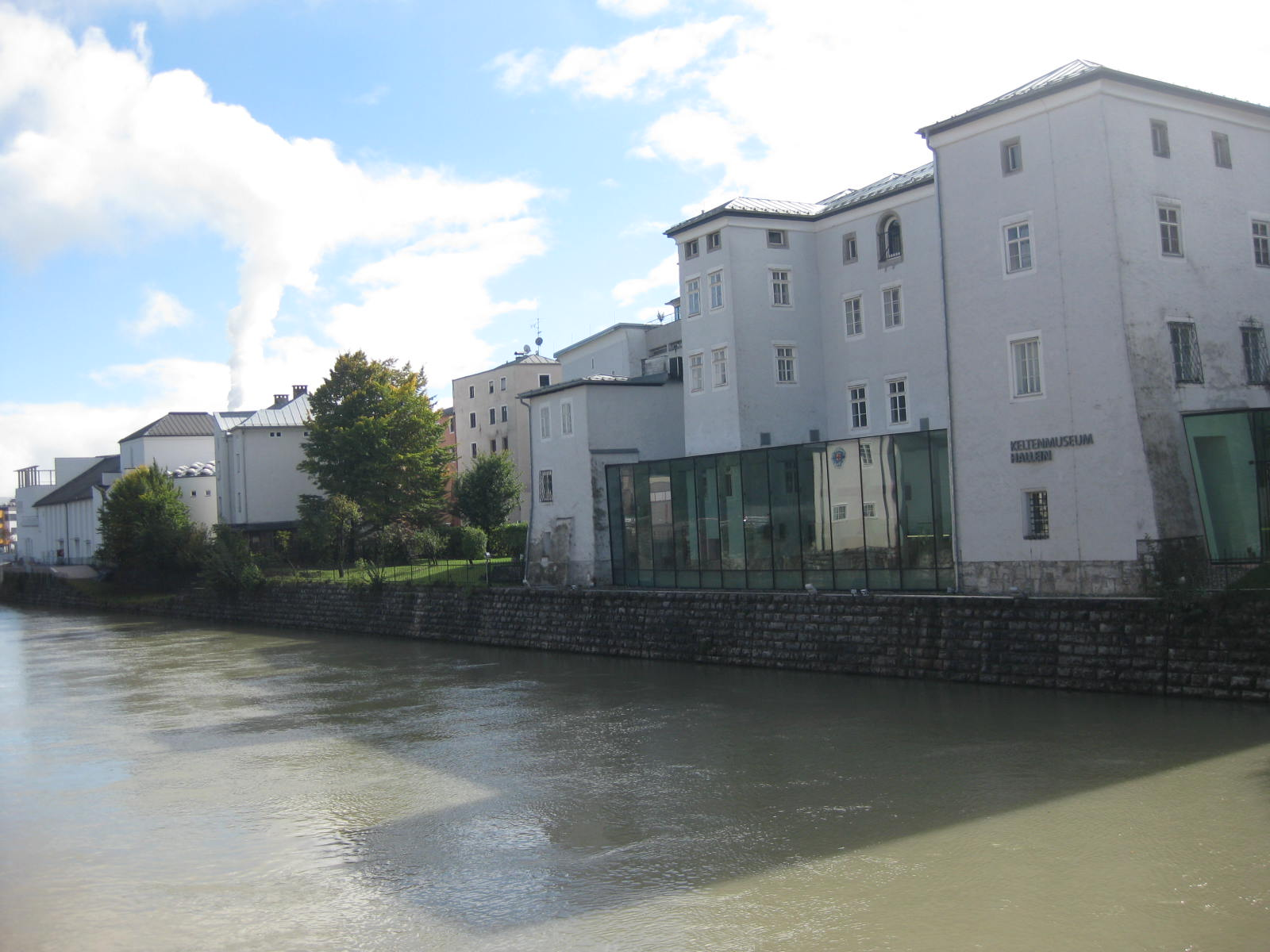
The Keltenmuseum, Hallein from the river Salzach. Former Salt Warehouse and Offices converted by Heinz Tesar

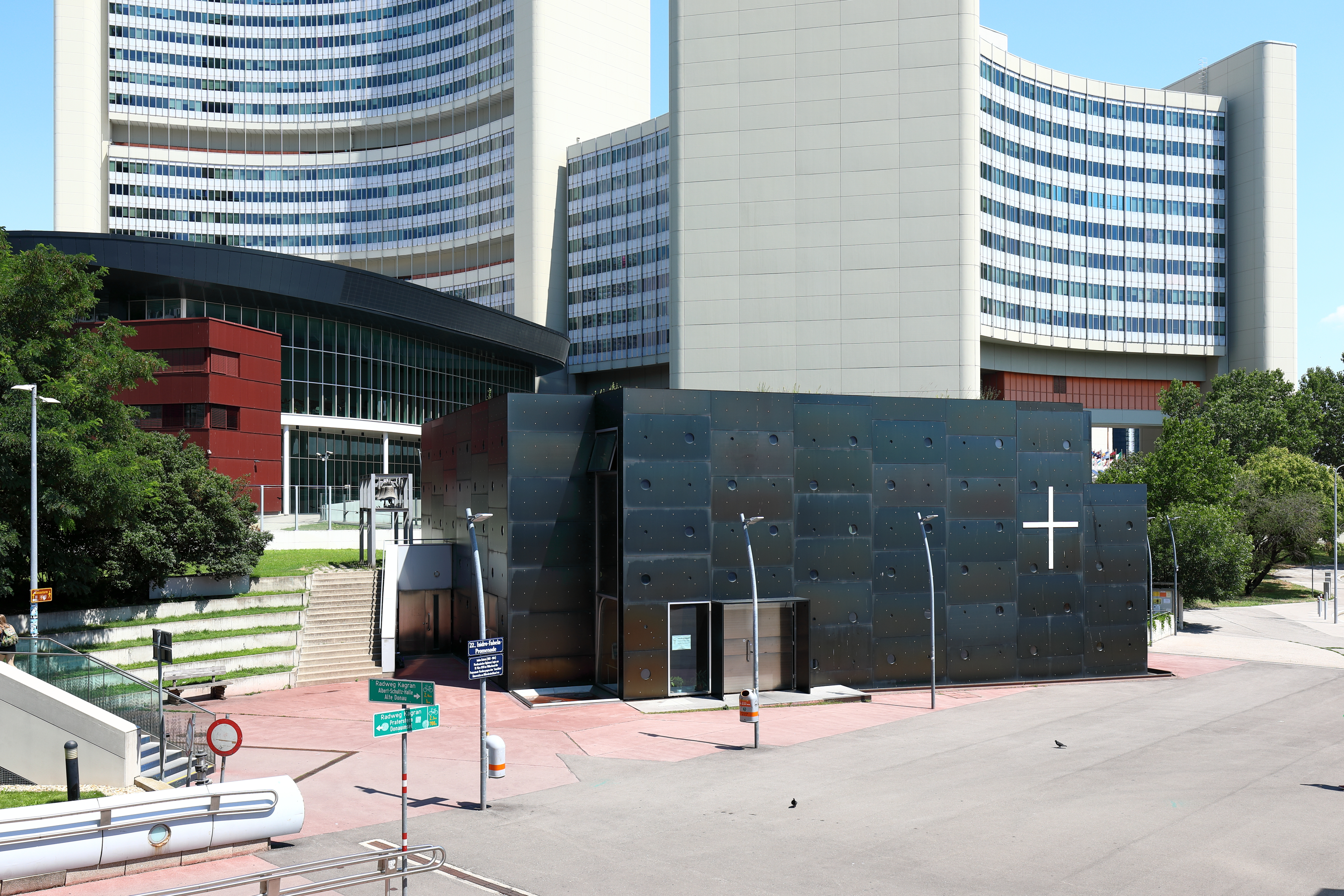
Donau City Church, Vienna

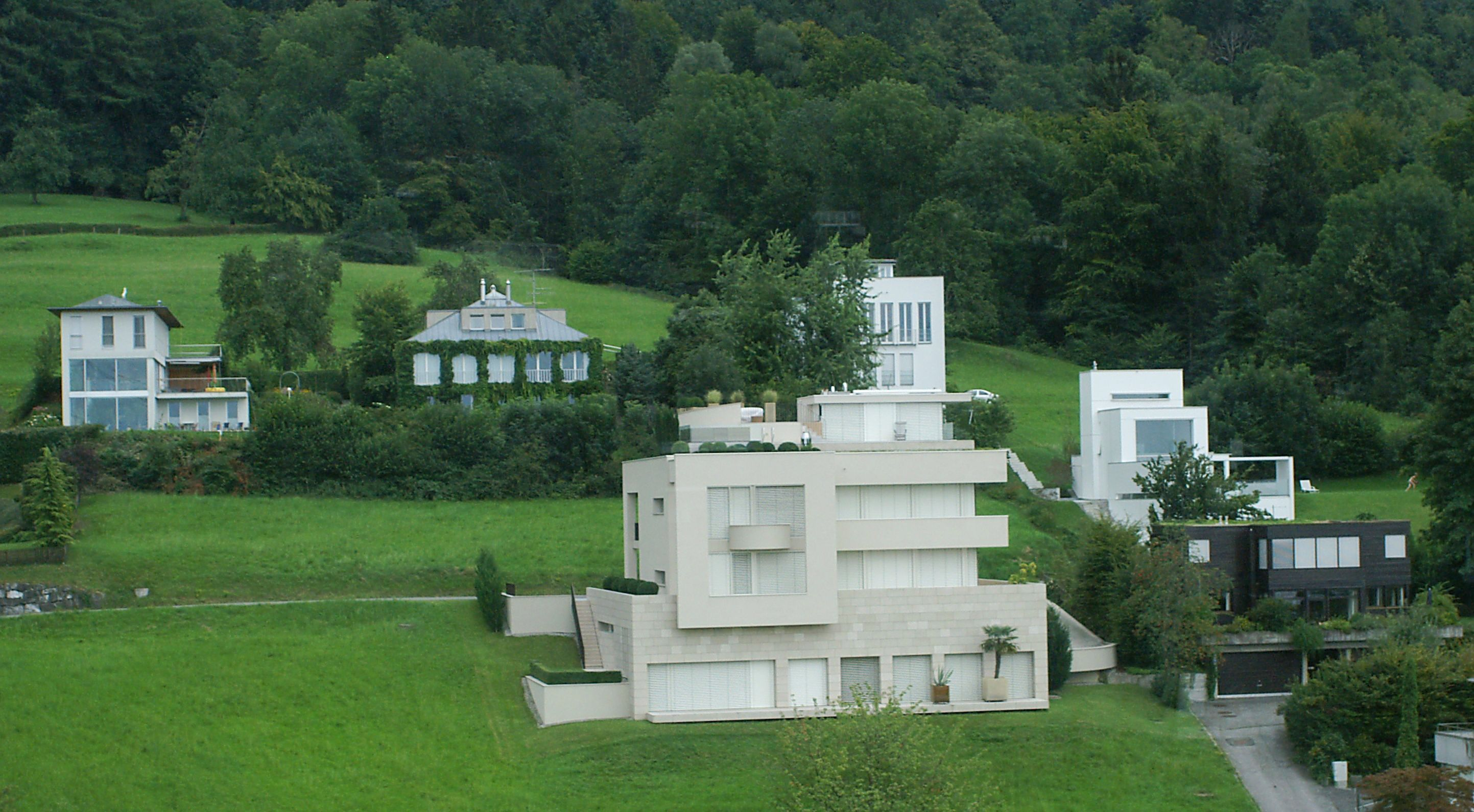
Residential area in Bregenz, house by Tesar is the second house from the right (white with high windows)

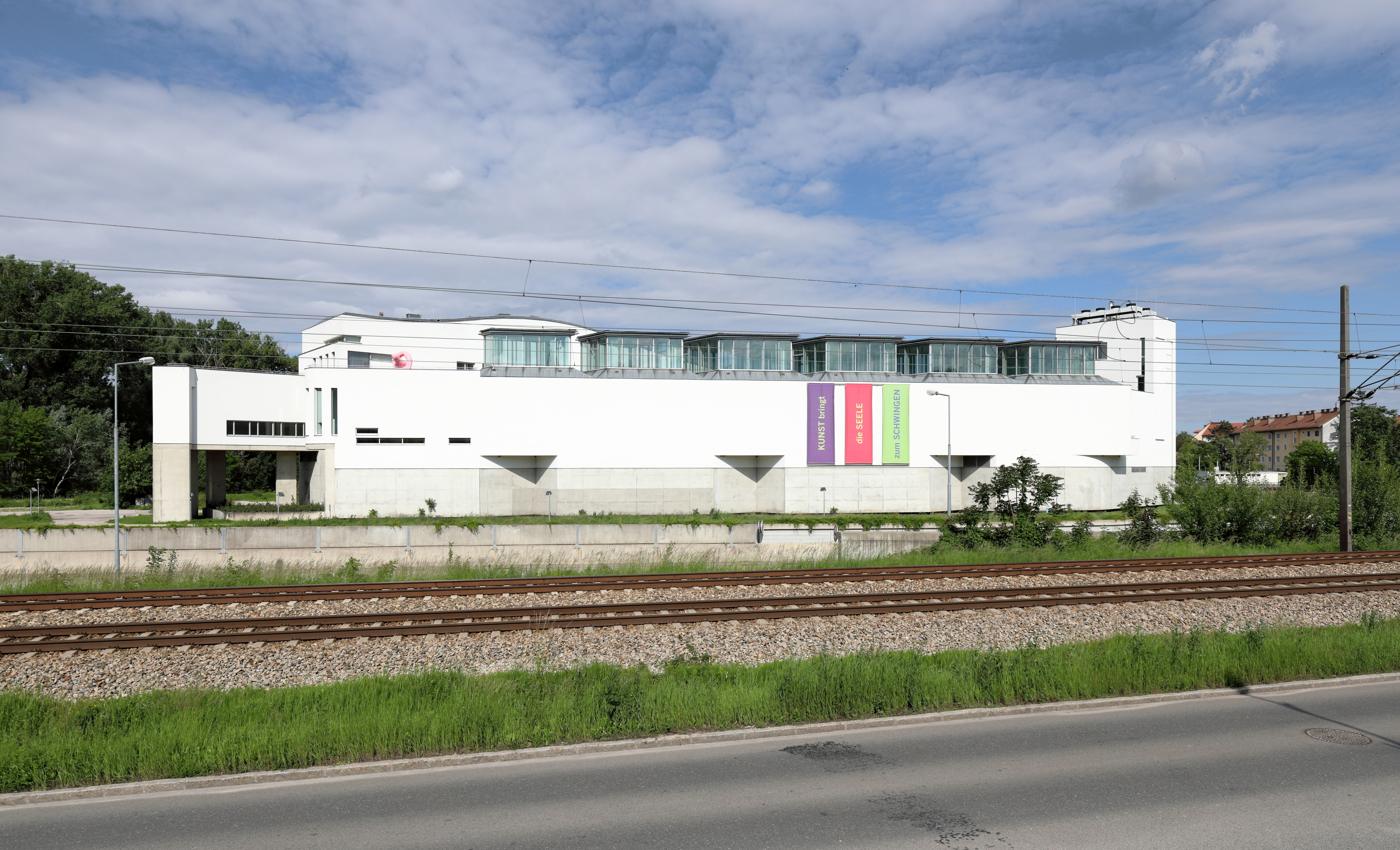
ESSL Museum

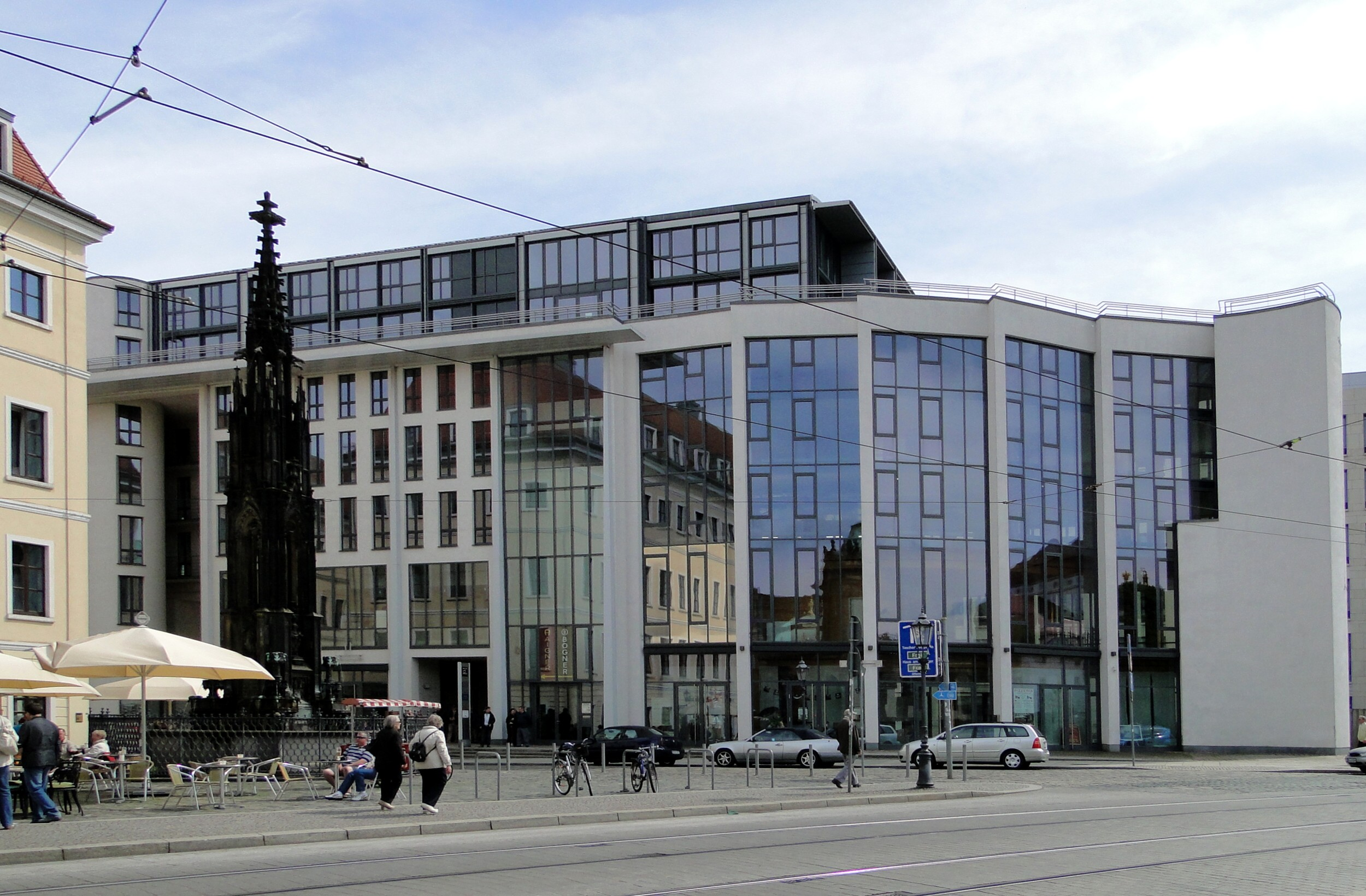
Haus am Zwinger 2010
