= Donau City Church =

Church in Vienna, Austria

Christus, Hoffnung der Welt
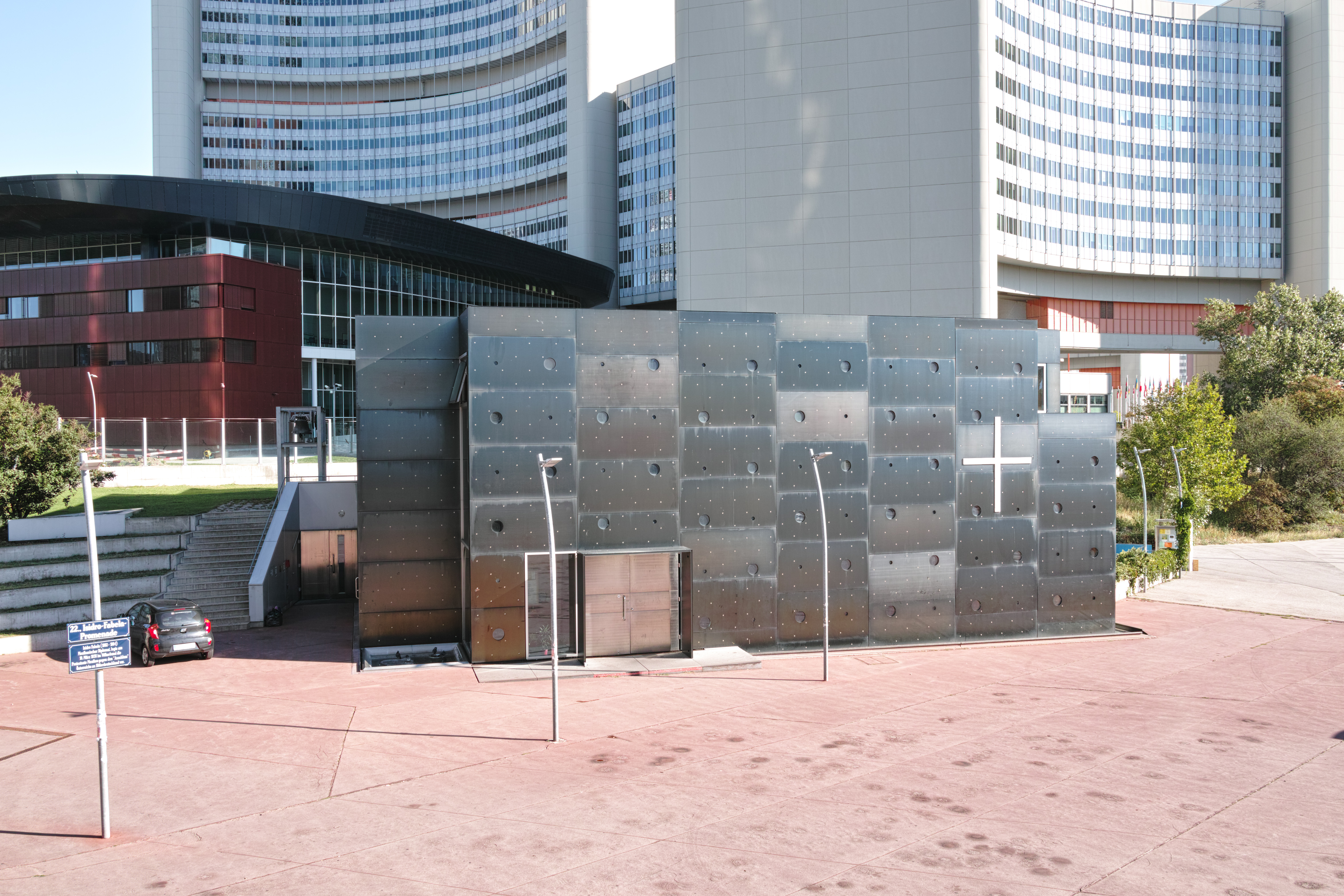
- Donau City Church, Vienna

Religion
- Affiliation: Roman Catholic
- Leadership: P. Albert Johann Gabriel SDS
- Year consecrated: 2000

Location
- Location: Vienna, Austria
- Interactive map of Christus, Hoffnung der Welt
- Coordinates: 48°13′59.1″N 16°24′54.8″E

Architecture
- Architect: Heinz Tesar
- Type: Church
- Groundbreaking: 1999
- Completed: 2000

Specifications
- Direction of façade: SSW
- Length: 25 m
- Width: 22 m

Website
- Official Website

The Donau City Church (German: Donaucitykirche), known more formally by its dedication as Christus, Hoffnung der Welt ("Christ, Hope of the World") is a Roman Catholic parish church in Vienna's 22nd district (Donau City or Donaustadt). The church is located next to the Vienna International Centre. Its architect is Heinz Tesar.
