= Taschenbergpalais =

Hotel in Dresden, Germany

Coordinates: 51°03′07″N 13°44′09″E

Hotel Taschenbergpalais Kempinski Dresden
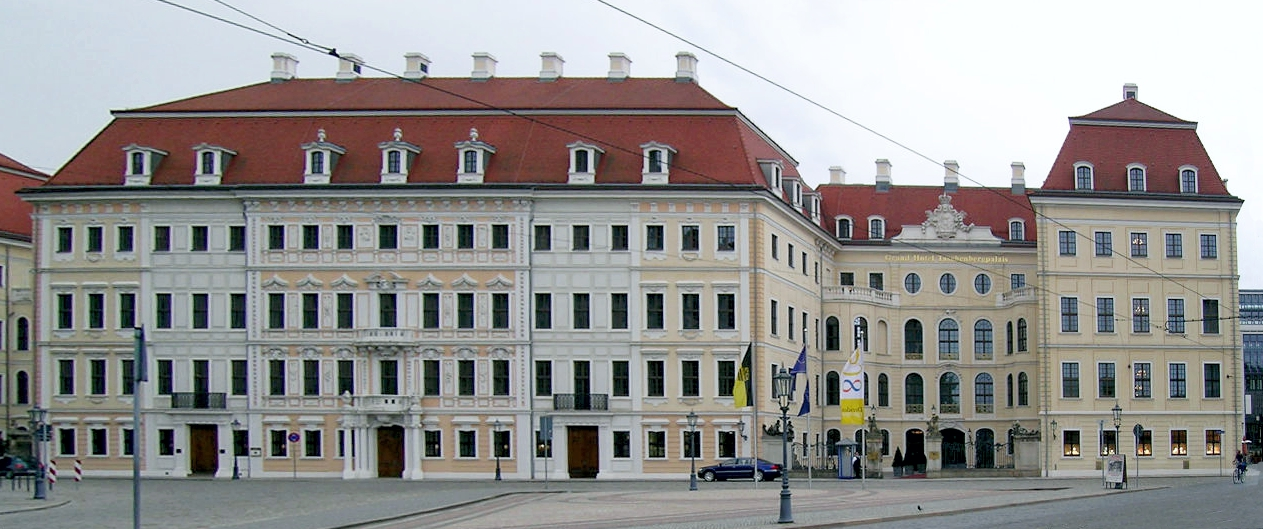
- Hotel Taschenbergpalais Kempinski Dresden
- Interactive map of the Hotel Taschenbergpalais Kempinski Dresden area
- Hotel chain: Kempinski Hotels S.A.

General information
- Location: Dresden, Germany
- Opening: 1995

Other information
- Number of rooms: 180
- Number of suites: 31
- Number of restaurants: 3

Website
- www.kempinski.com/en/hotel-taschenbergpalais

The Hotel Taschenbergpalais Kempinski Dresden is a historic palace hotel managed by the Kempinski chain. It is located on Sophie Street, next to the Dresden Castle, in front of the Zwinger, and adjacent to the Semperoper and the Dresden Cathedral. The facade of the building, as well as the staircase on the inside of the building are surviving portions of the original 18-th Century structure, while the interior is modern.

== History ==
When the architect, Johann Friedrich Karcher, commenced building the Taschenbergpalais in 1705, he followed the design of previous buildings. The Taschenbergpalais was the palace of Anna Constantia von Brockdorff, later Countess of Cosel and one of Augustus II's mistresses. After Anna Constantia von Hoym was banned by Augustus II in 1713, the Taschenbergpalais was renovated and named "Turkish Palais". From 1718 to 1720, the Palais was expanded several times for the crown prince family by Matthäus Daniel Pöppelmann and Raymond Leplat. The two fountains next to the entrance were constructed from 1747 to 1750 by Johann Christoph Knöffel. The fountains were restored in 1990, and copies were set up next to the entrance while the Taschenbergpalais was being rebuilt. The last expansion was added in 1843 to the south eastern part of the building.

After being extensively restored in 1934, Taschenbergpalais was destroyed in 1945 by the bombing of Dresden. It remained in ruins for nearly half a century, until reconstruction started in 1992, using original models and remains. Reconstruction was completed in 1995 at a cost of 127.8 million euros, and on 31 March 1995 the Hotel Taschenbergpalais Kempinski Dresden opened as the first five-star hotel in Saxony.

In September 2014, the hotel was sold by Octavian Hotel Holding to businessman Erwin Conradi. The hotel was again sold, to a partnership of the Frankfurt-based RFR Group and the Essen-based RAG Foundation in December 2016.

The hotel closed on 4 January 2023 for extensive renovations, and reopened on 15 February 2024.

== Features ==
The hotel features 213 rooms and suites as well as the Palais Bistro restaurant, the Café Vestibül coffeehouse located next to the historical staircase, and the Karl May Bar. Furthermore, the hotel contains a spa area with a pool, steam bath, sauna, fitness center, and massage treatments.

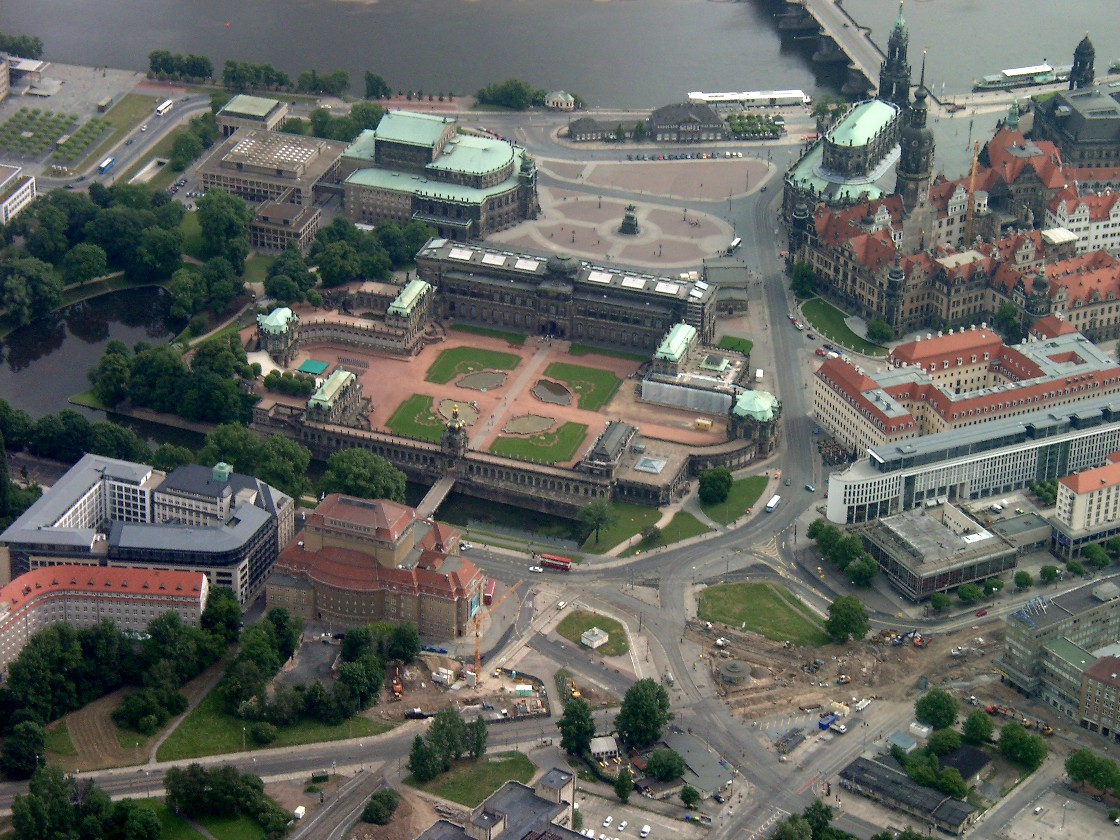
Aerial view featuring Taschenbergpalais (middle on the right image border)

== Prominent Guests ==
On 4 June 2009 the 44th President of the United States of America Barack Obama stayed at the hotel during his visit to Dresden. Other visitors include politicians such as Horst Köhler, Vladimir Putin, Jacques Chirac, Helmut Schmidt, and Gerhard Schröder, royalty such as Margrethe II of Denmark, Beatrix of the Netherlands, and Prince Albert II of Monaco, and artists like Günter Grass, Thomas Gottschalk, Karl Lagerfeld and Anna Netrebko.

In June 2016, the 2016 Bilderberg Conference was held at the hotel.
