= Wilhelm Holzbauer =

Austrian architect (1930–2019)

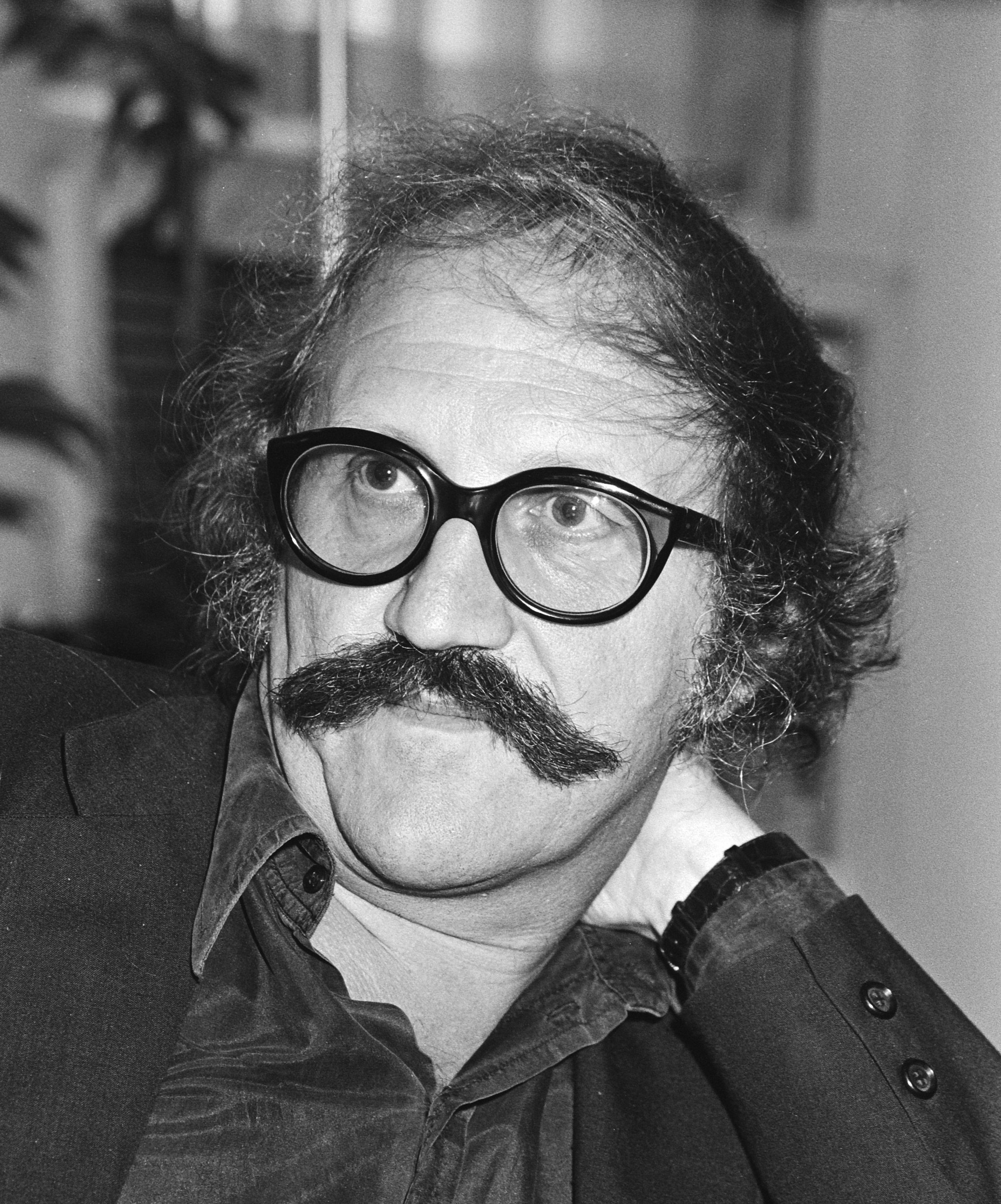
Wilhelm Holzbauer in 1981

Wilhelm Holzbauer (3 September 1930 – 15 June 2019) was an Austrian architect, noted as a "pragmatic" modernist. He was a student of Clemens Holzmeister at the Vienna University of Technology between 1950 and 1953. In 1956–57, he studied at the Massachusetts Institute of Technology as a Fulbright Scholar. From 1977 to 1998, he was professor at the University of Applied Arts Vienna.

== Projects ==
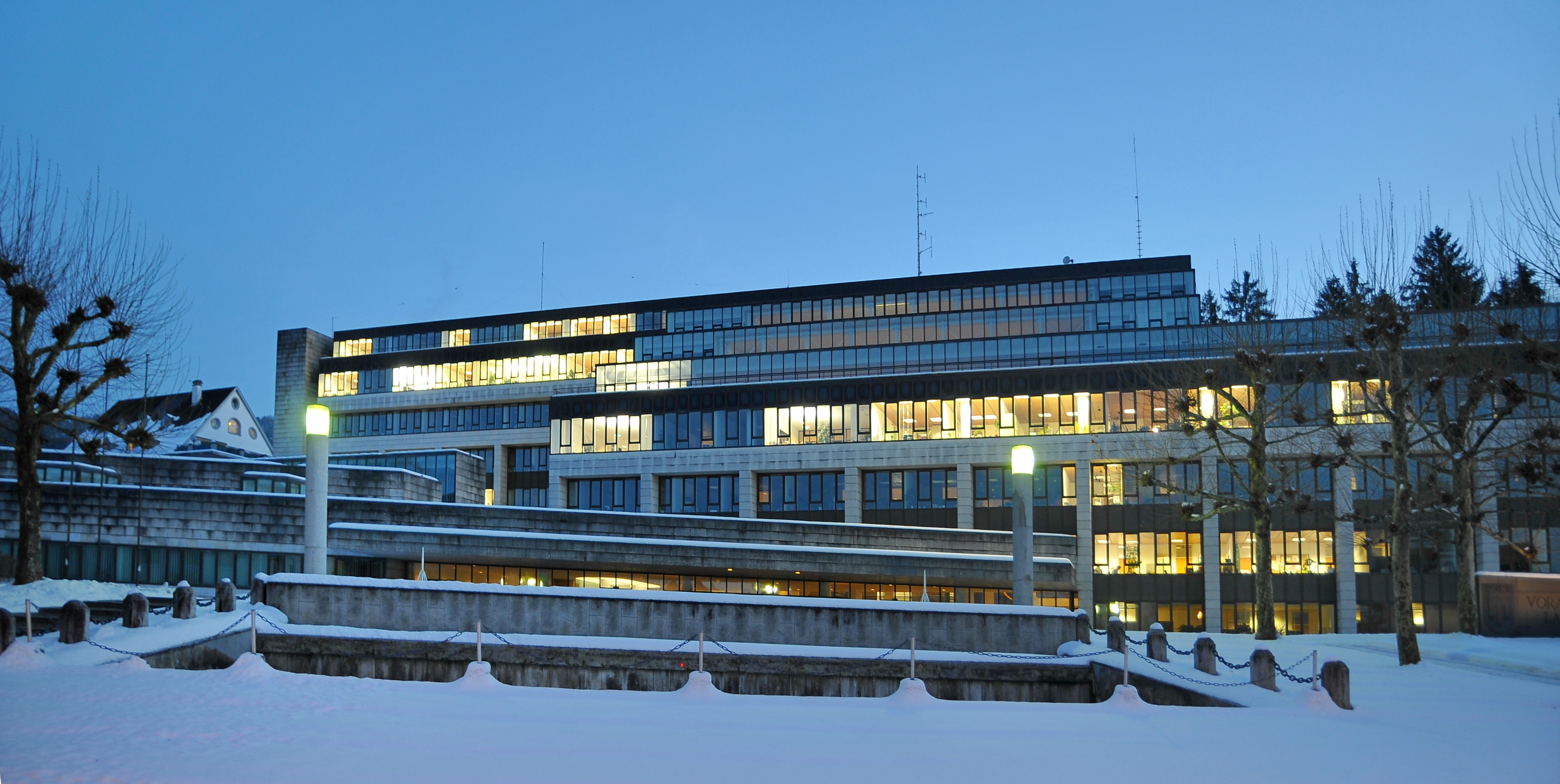
Landhaus in Bregenz (1975–81)

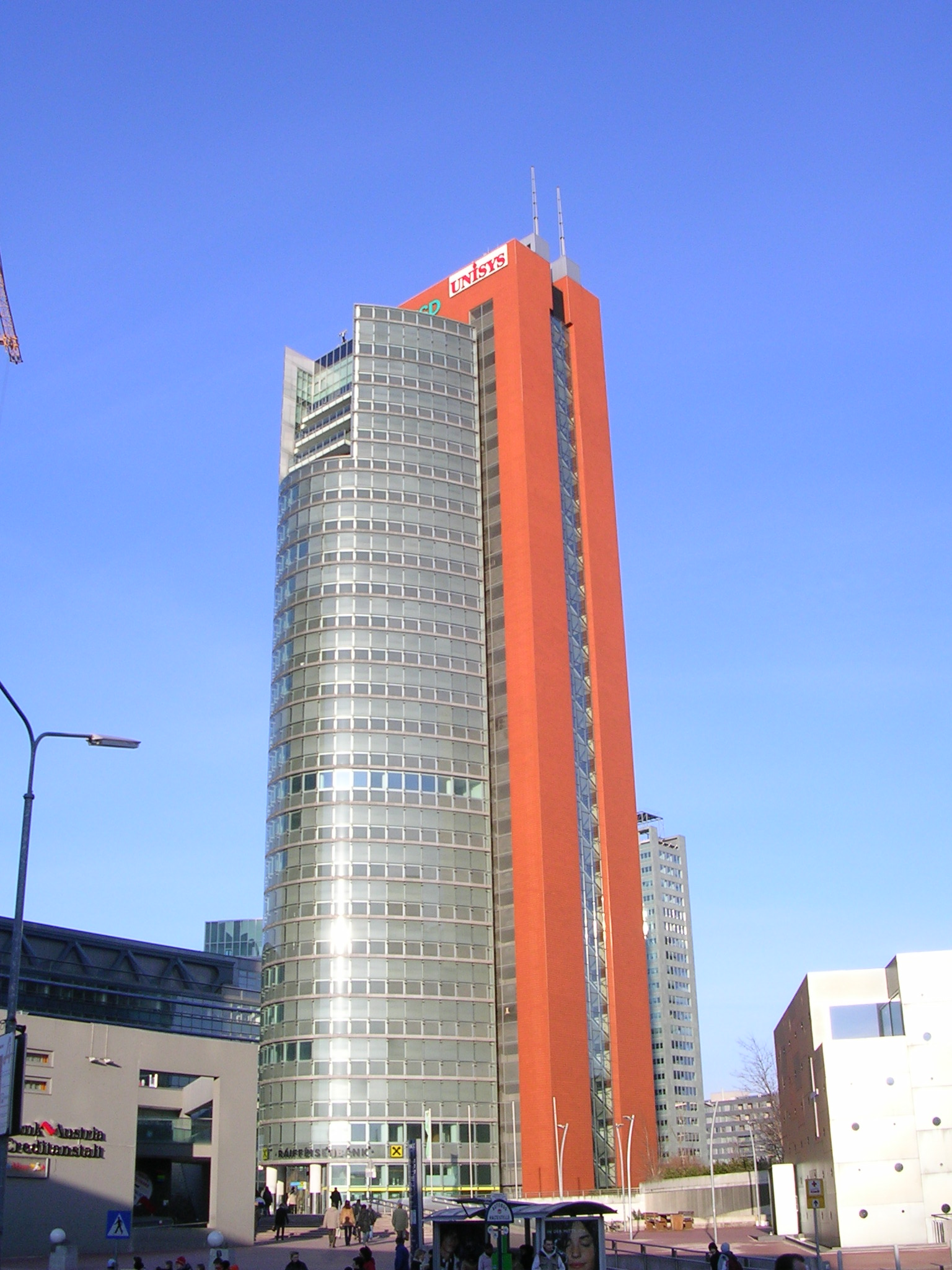
Andromeda Tower Vienna (1996–98)

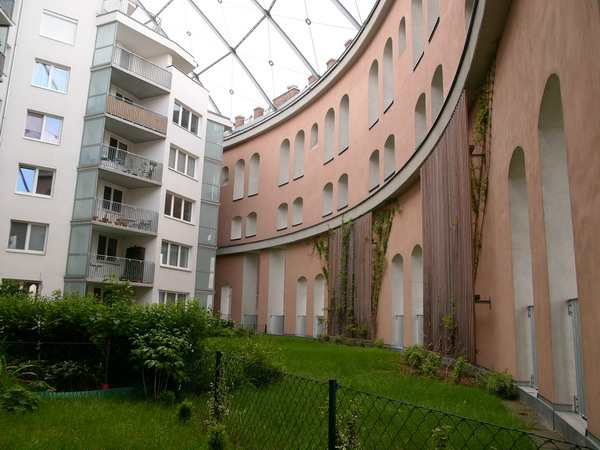
Gasometer D, Vienna (1999–2001)

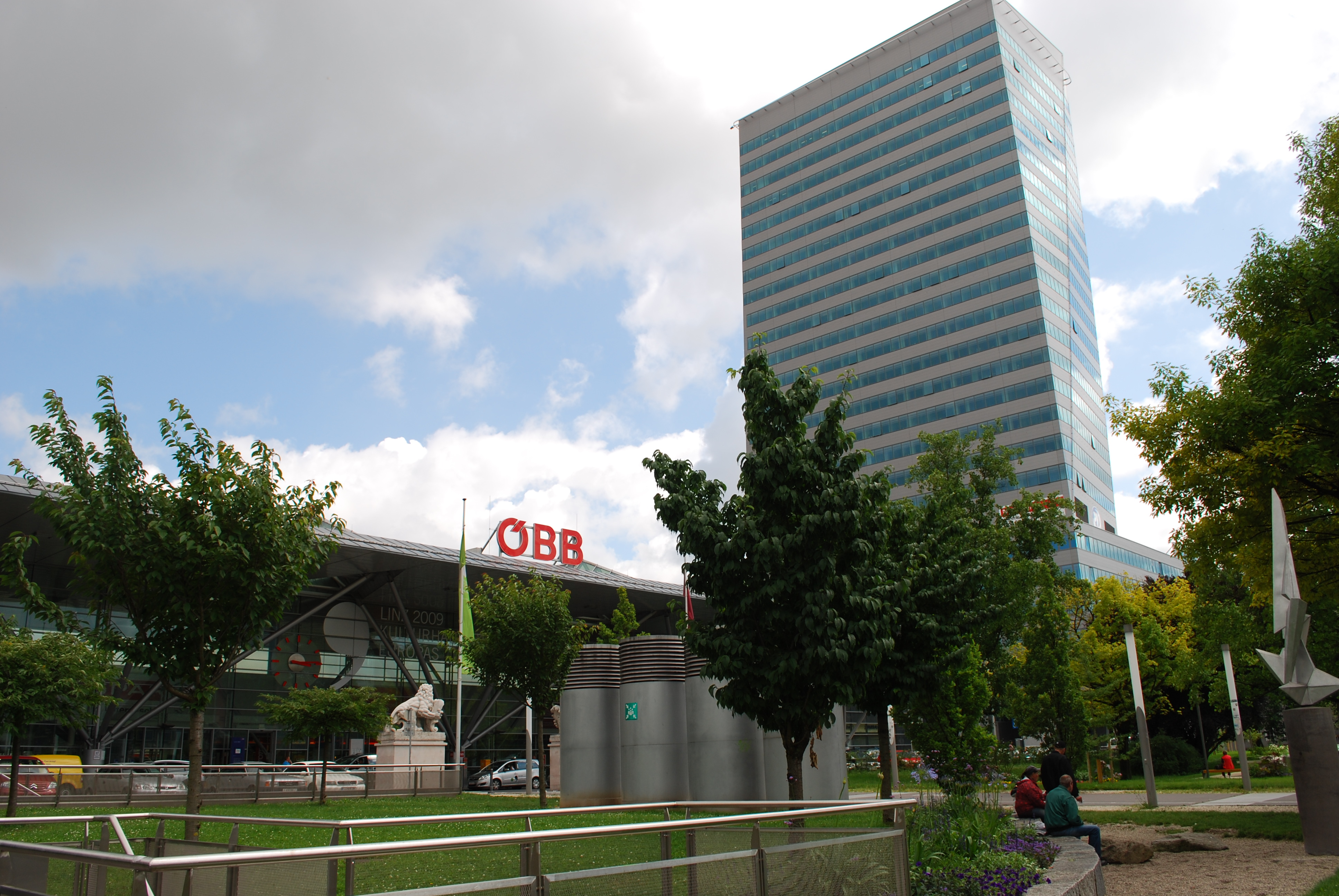
Linz Central Station (2001–05)

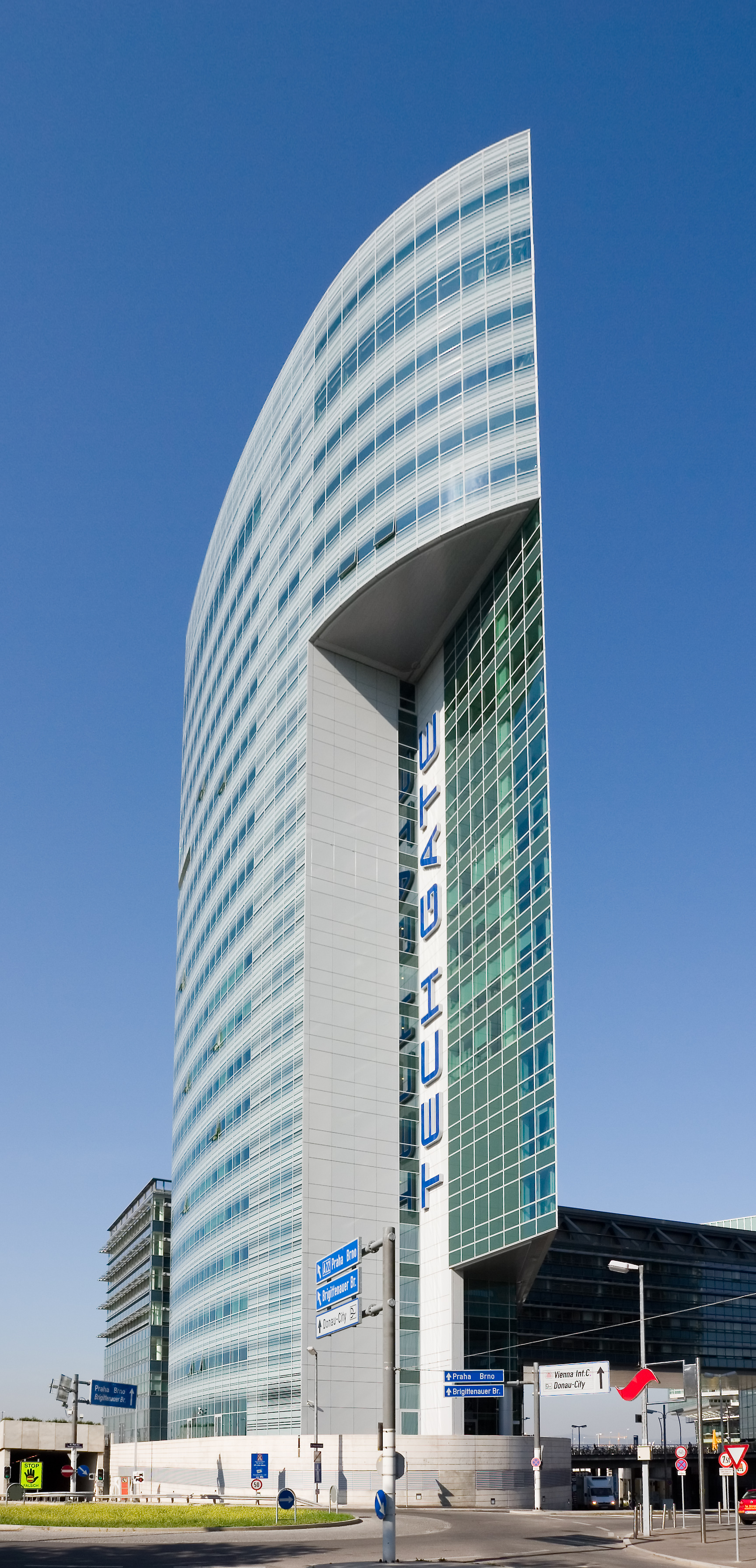
Tech Gate Tower, Vienna (2003–05)
