= DC Towers =

Skyscraper complex in Vienna, Austria

- DC Tower 1, 2 and 3 (2026)

General information
- Status: DC Tower 1 (complete); DC Tower 2 (under construction)
- Type: Mixed-use: Residential / Office / Hotel
- Location: Vienna, Austria
- Coordinates: 48°13′55″N 16°24′46″E
- Construction started: 17 June 2010
- Completed: 2013 (DC Tower 1); 2026 (DC Tower 2)
- Owner: Deka Immobilien

Height
- Height: 220 m (720 ft) - DC Tower 1; 190 m (620 ft) - DC Tower 2
- Tip: 250 m (820 ft) - DC Tower 1

Technical details
- Floor count: 60 (DC Tower 1); 44 (DC Tower 2)
- Floor area: 93,600 m^{2} (1,008,000 ft^{2}) - DC Tower 1; 61,700 m^{2} (664,000 ft^{2}) - DC Tower 2

Design and construction
- Architect: Dominique Perrault
- Structural engineer: Werner Sobek AG

Website
- DC Towers

The DC Towers, also known as the Donau City Towers, is a mixed-use skyscraper complex in the Donaustadt District of Vienna, Austria. The towers were designed by French architect Dominique Perrault. Werner Sobek AG was responsible for the structural engineering as well as the facade and height access planning of DC Tower 1.

DC Tower 1, the tallest skyscraper in Austria at 220 metres (720 ft) or 250 metres (820 ft) including the antenna spire, was officially finished with an opening ceremony on 26 February 2014 attended by architect Perrault and former astronaut Buzz Aldrin. Due to the 2008 financial crisis, ground breaking was delayed several times. Eventually, construction was started on 17 June 2010.

As of June 2012, tenants were confirmed for 50 percent of the floor space according to the owner Wiener Entwicklungsgesellschaft für den Donauraum. Most of the available floor space will be used for offices. Baxter International has been confirmed as one of the largest tenants. The upper floors will be used for apartments, while the first 15 floors will house a four-star hotel operated by the Spanish Sol Meliá Group. There will also be a restaurant in one of the top floors.

DC Tower 2 will reach 180 m (590 ft), making it Vienna's fourth-tallest building. It will house offices, shops and rental flats.

== History ==
=== Concept ===
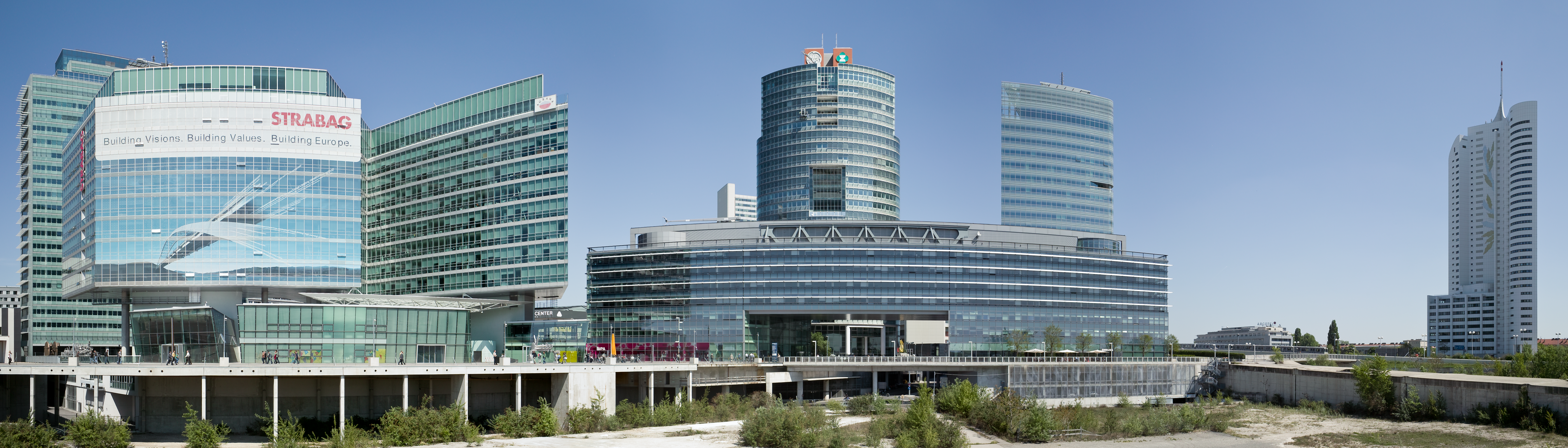
Panorama of Donau City before construction begins with the vacant plot in the foreground

The first development concepts for the site in Donau City were already in place in the early 1990s, but they were all rejected. In 2002, the WED (Vienna Development Company for the Danube Region AG) then announced an international design competition for this last section to be developed. The architect Dominique Perrault from Paris was awarded the contract in this expert review process. He was then commissioned to draw up a master plan for the area. Based on these plans, an urban development concept was drawn up and approved by the local council on 1 July 2004. In contrast to previous projects at the site, mixed use was prescribed here. Until a rezoning to 220 m (720 ft) in 2007, the maximum height of buildings on the site was 120 m (390 ft). This value refers to the construction height with the antenna being excluded.

The vacant plot of land, located directly on the Reichsbrücke, was a prime urban development site; the prominent location at the entrance to Donau City required special utilization. A "landmark" that could be seen from far away was to be created. There were 120 different designs before the final concept was developed. Perrault designed two double towers as a "bridgehead" as a built entrance gate for the district. The design of the third tower was by the Vorarlberg office of Dietrich Untertrifaller Architekten.

The project was originally scheduled to start in 2007, but construction was delayed several times.

=== Construction phases ===
The towers, designed by Perrault, are being built in collaboration with the Viennese firm Hoffmann-Janz Architekten. The civil engineering was carried out by Porr and the structural work by Max Bögl. A total of around 100,000 cubic metres of concrete and 17,000 tonnes of reinforcing steel were used. The total weight of the tower is 290,000 tonnes.

=== 2010 ===
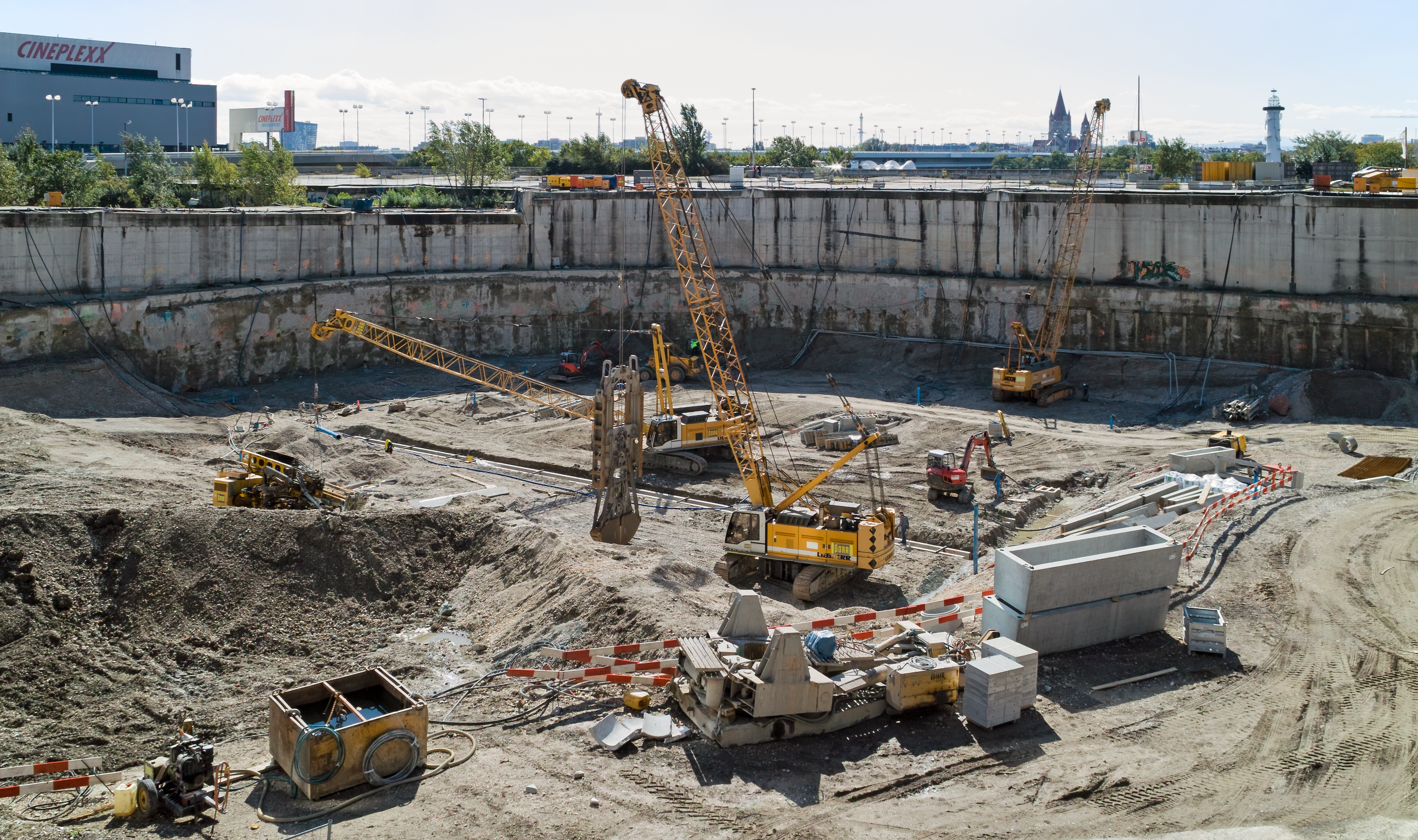
Construction progress in September 2010 ...

The first activities on the then vacant site were already visible at the end of February 2010. The laying of the foundation stone and the start of construction finally followed on 17 June 2010. In November, the first pile drilling began and the first permanently mounted construction crane was used. In December, construction of the foundation was already in full swing. The settlement behavior in view of the location directly next to the overlay of the Danube bank motorway A22 and the proximity to the Danube required a special deep foundation. Under the base plate, which is 4 m (13 ft) thick in its core, diaphragm wall piles extend a further 35 m (115 ft) into the building ground. In the area of the base plate alone, 13,000 cubic meters of concrete were installed (this corresponds to the load of 1,625 concrete mixer trucks). The civil engineering work was completed in 6 months.

=== 2011 ===
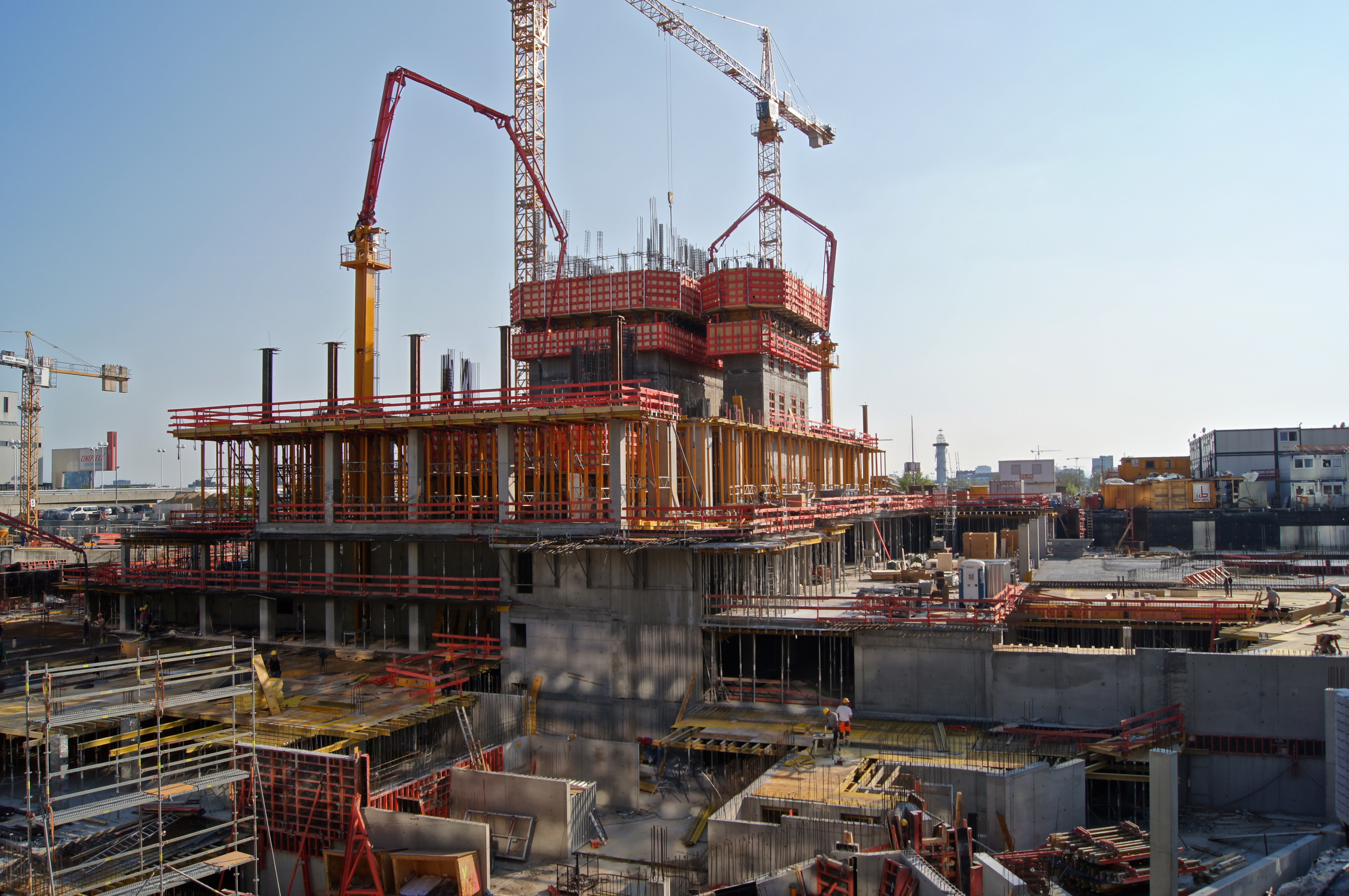
... April 2011 ...

The most progress was visible in 2011. Construction began at the end of March 2011, and the first underground floors were completed at the beginning of April. At the end of April, the first above-ground floor was built and the concrete core took on visible dimensions. There were now five fixed construction cranes in operation. At the beginning of June, the first fixed roof crane was assembled and the movable weather protection was attached. By July, the DC Tower 1 under construction could already be seen from every tall building in Vienna. In the same month, the crane on the left outside of the tower that grows with it was attached to the building, and the first freight elevator was installed on the west side of the tower. In August 2011, the concrete core disappeared into the growing building and the 13th floor was completed. Work also began on raising the glass facade on the west, north and south sides.

In September, construction of the glass facade on the east side of the building began. Since then, the facade has been raised on all four sides of the tower to provide protection from wind and weather, but there was hardly any progress in the construction. This was due to the outrigger floors, which are intended to ensure the stability of the building. These were completed at the end of November, but the expected opening date was postponed from the beginning of 2013 to summer 2013 at the earliest.

=== 2012–2013 ===
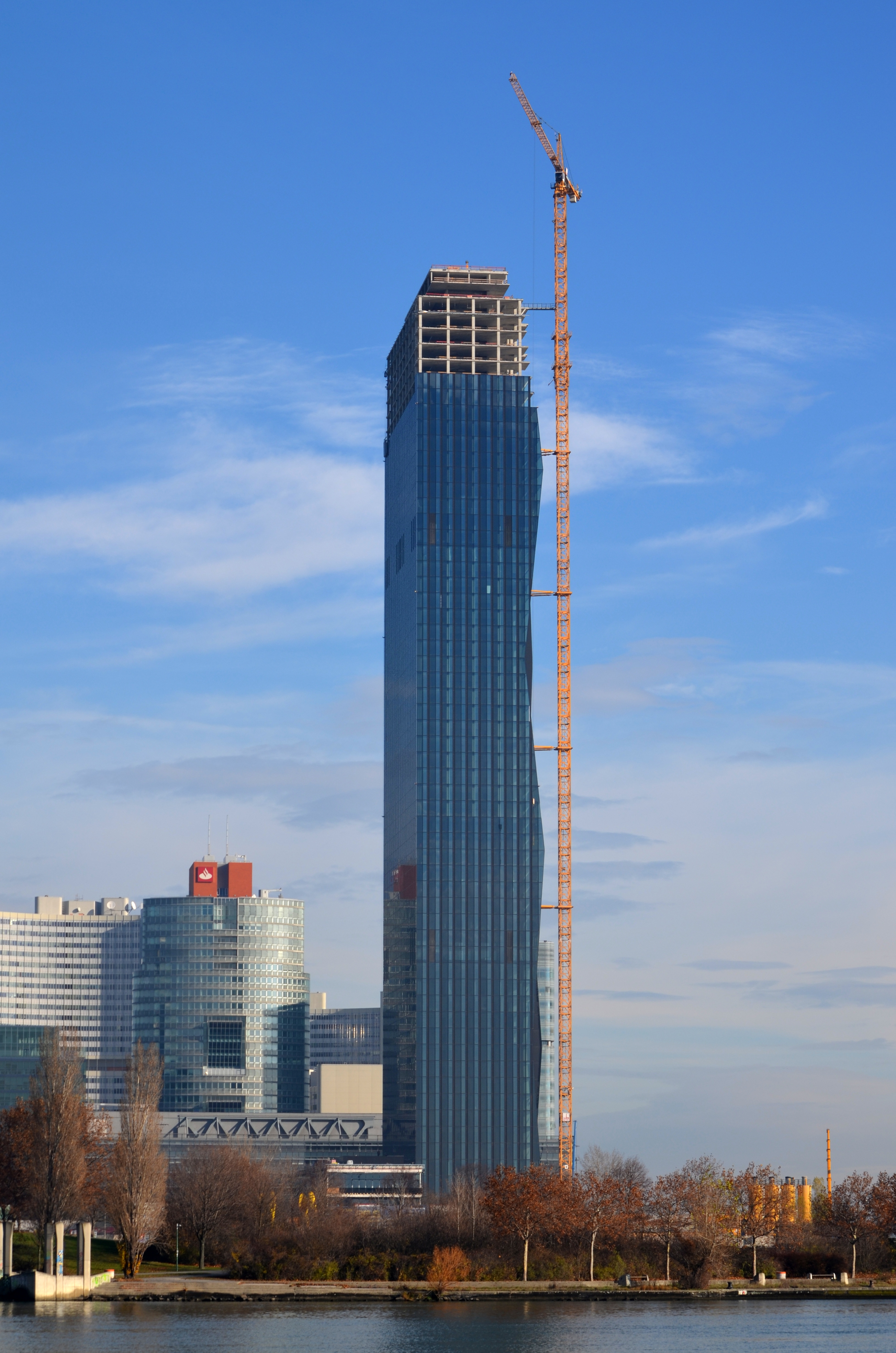
... and November 2012 after reaching the final height

From spring 2012, the tower started growing again. Roughly every 5 days, the tower grew by one floor. At the end of April 2012, work was started on the 32nd floor, which marks about half of the final construction height. On 25 October of the same year, the 60th and final floor was reached. According to WED, work was carried out six days a week. In late summer 2013, the last facade elements were being assembled. The two construction cranes that were still in use on the tower at the time were gradually dismantled. They had previously grown with the building over the entire construction period. One was attached to the outside of the supporting structure, the other was placed in one of the elevator shafts. On 19 September 2013, the approximately 30 m (98 ft) tall antenna was finally brought into position using a special helicopter from Heliswiss. The building was thus completed externally.

=== Tower 1 opening ===
The official opening ceremony of the hotel and tower took place on 26 February 2014. Guests of honor included architect Perrault, Vienna Mayor Michael Häupl, former New York Mayor Rudy Giuliani and former astronaut Buzz Aldrin.

=== Tower 2 ===
DC Tower 2

The DC Tower 2 is planned to reach 175 m (574 ft) tall. The significant difference in height between the buildings is also reflected in the different letters of "DC" in the construction project's logo. However, the start of construction was delayed several times, not least due to the 2008 financial crisis. In the spring of 2016, the building site for Tower 2 was sold to a German real estate fund.

In March 2018, it was announced that the Vienna-based S+B Group had signed a general contractor contract for the second Donau City Tower with the owner of the property, the German company Commerz Real. The planned start of construction in 2019 was not met. In 2020, it was announced that Tower 2 would no longer follow the design of Tower 1. The reason given was that due to the proportion of apartments instead of almost exclusively offices as in Tower 1 as open spaces were desired and these would not be compatible with the wave design.

Construction began in 2022 and the development company expects completion in 2026.

=== Tower 3 ===
The complex shares its area with the DC Tower 3, a residential serviced apartments regimed building constructed between 2019 and 2022.

== Layout ==
=== Development and security ===
The access logic on the ground follows the Donau-City concept: pedestrian and traffic levels are on different levels. The main access to the complex is via the central roundabout of Donau City on the Donau-City-Straße named after it. The address is 1220 Vienna, Donau-City-Straße 7 . Tenants of Tower 1 can drive directly into the garage from this level, visitors and taxis are directed up to the access level -1. For better orientation, this was designed as an open space. This is where the hotel access and the entrance to the public underground car park are located. It has space for 354 vehicles. Deliveries and disposal take place via the central loading yard, which is also located on this level and is connected to the service elevators. The higher pedestrian level can also be reached via open stairs. There are separate entrances for the different user groups on this level.

The tower's security concept provides for the separation of the individual visitor flows, which is facilitated by the Donau City, which is laid out on different levels. The building is divided into individual security areas, in which the movement flows as well as the entrances and exits are controlled and monitored. In the reception areas, separation systems and in the elevators, intelligent control technology prevent the mixing of user groups. The distribution of people within the building is carried out via 29 elevators and two escalators. Two elevators are designed as full-fledged freight and fire service elevators with a nominal load of up to 2,500 kg. The DC Tower currently has the fastest elevators in Austria. At up to 8 m/s (around 29 km/h), the highest floor can be reached in 40 seconds.

The public areas and hotel floors are accessed separately by four fully glazed elevators. However, a cantilevered spiral staircase is also installed in the base building. The main elevators in the tower are equipped with a destination selection system, where the destination floor is selected before entering the cabin. The system then directs the user to an elevator, thus enabling shorter waiting times and fewer stops. In the DC Tower, this system has been expanded so that the access controls are also connected to the elevator control. This means that the next elevator is assigned as soon as the passengers pass through the security gates.

=== Usage ===
Since the beginning of 2014, the five-star Meliá Vienna hotel of the Spanish chain Meliá Hotels International has been located on the lower 15 floors of Tower 1, with 253 rooms and 1,079 m^{2} of event space. The hotel also has restaurants on the 57th and 58th floors. The second floor also houses a 1,700 m^{2} fitness club with a wellness area and indoor pool. Most of the remaining floors are rented out as office space. Baxter International was announced as the first major tenant in 2011. The Austrian subsidiary of Astellas Pharma moved into the tower at the beginning of 2015. Other office tenants include voestalpine, the auditing firm PwC Austria, the IBM Client Innovation Center Austria, and CRRC ZELC, a subsidiary of the Chinese rail vehicle manufacturer CRRC, which has established its European headquarters here. On level 58 there is a terrace at a height of 207 m (679 ft). The part facing the city centre is run by the bar located here, the second half was accessible as a paid viewing platform (sky terrace) until the end of 2016. Since October 2014, ORS has also been using the 245-metre antenna to broadcast television programmes.

- Floors 1–15: Hotel Meliá Vienna, restaurants Flow and Ra'mien go
- Floor 2: John Harris Fitness Club
- Floors 16–17: Building services
- Floors 18–42: Offices
- Floors 43–44: Building services
- Floors 45–56: Offices
- Floor 57: 57 Lounge and 57 Restaurant
- Floor 58: 57 Lounge, outdoor terrace
- Floors 59–60: Building services

Tower 2 will have restaurants and co-working spaces in the base area, offices up to the 30th floor, and apartments on the remaining floors.

Tower 3, just northeast of the other two towers, is used entirely as a student residence.

=== Ownership ===
The owner of the site of Tower 1 and responsible for the overall development is WED Wiener Entwicklungsgesellschaft für den Donauraum, which emerged from Expo AG in 1991. The builder and owner was VIENNA DC Tower 1 Liegenschaftsbesitz GmbH, which was initially a company of the WED Group, but was sold to the German Deka Immobilien in July 2017. The sales price was not announced; the investment volume for Tower 1 was originally 300 million euros. The properties in the tower are marketed by bareal Immobilientreuhand GmbH. In September 2016, over 90 percent of the space had been allocated. The building site for Tower 2 was sold to Commerz Real 's real estate fund hausInvest in spring 2016 ; the purchase price was also kept confidential. The neighboring property of DC Tower 3 is also owned by the German real estate fund. However, the land adjacent to the buildings on the banks of the Danube is owned by the City of Vienna, was previously leased and has been under renovation since 2018.

== Architecture ==
Panorama of Donau City with the DC Tower 1

The DC Tower 1 is the tallest skyscraper in Austria, but the tallest building in the country is still the nearby Donauturm. It is 2 m (6 ft 7 in) taller than the DC Tower 1. The large ratio of the height to the narrow width of the narrow side makes the tower one of the slenderest skyscrapers in the world. Measured from the ground, the tower is 260 m (850 ft) tall.

=== Volumetries ===
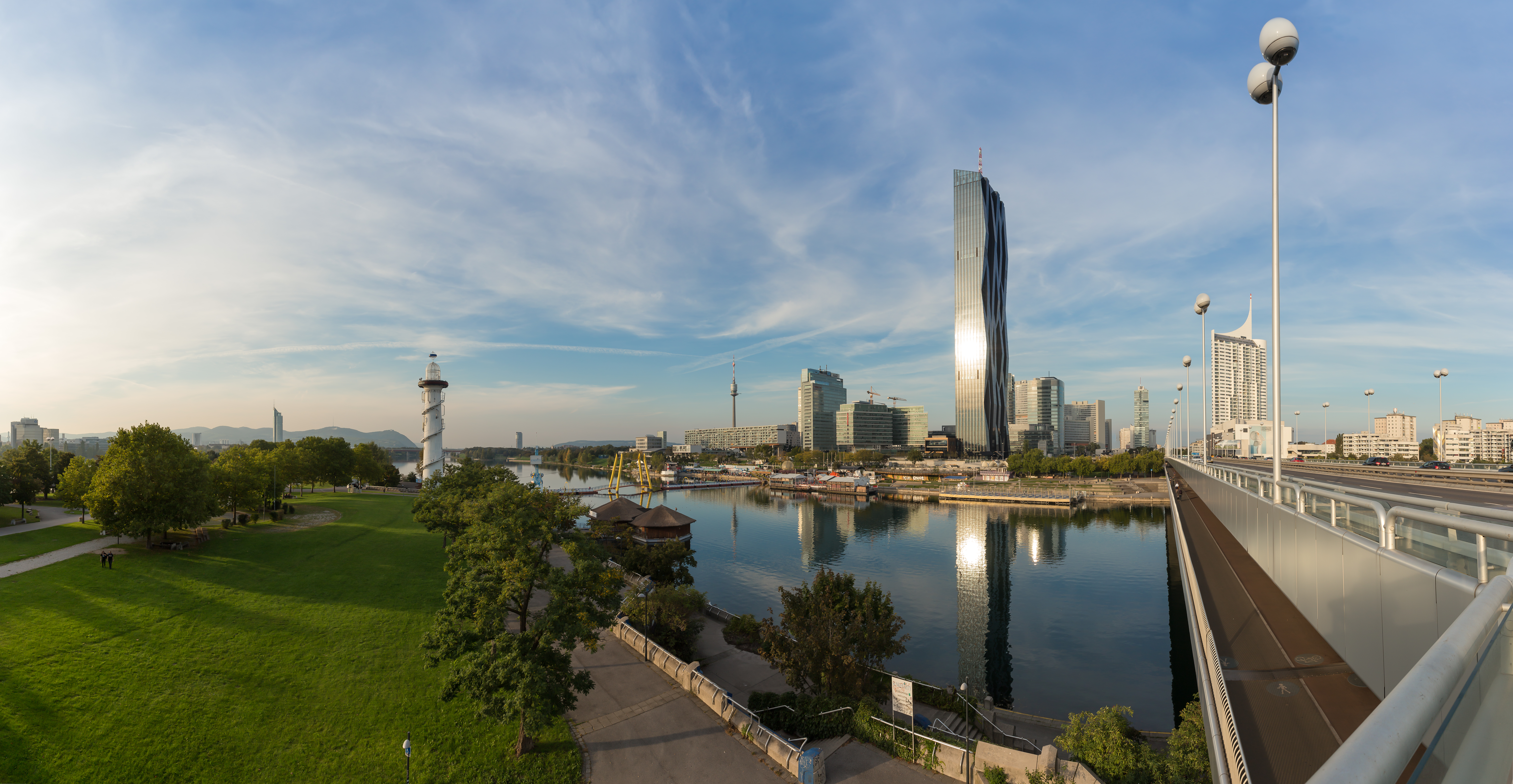
View from the Reichsbrücke

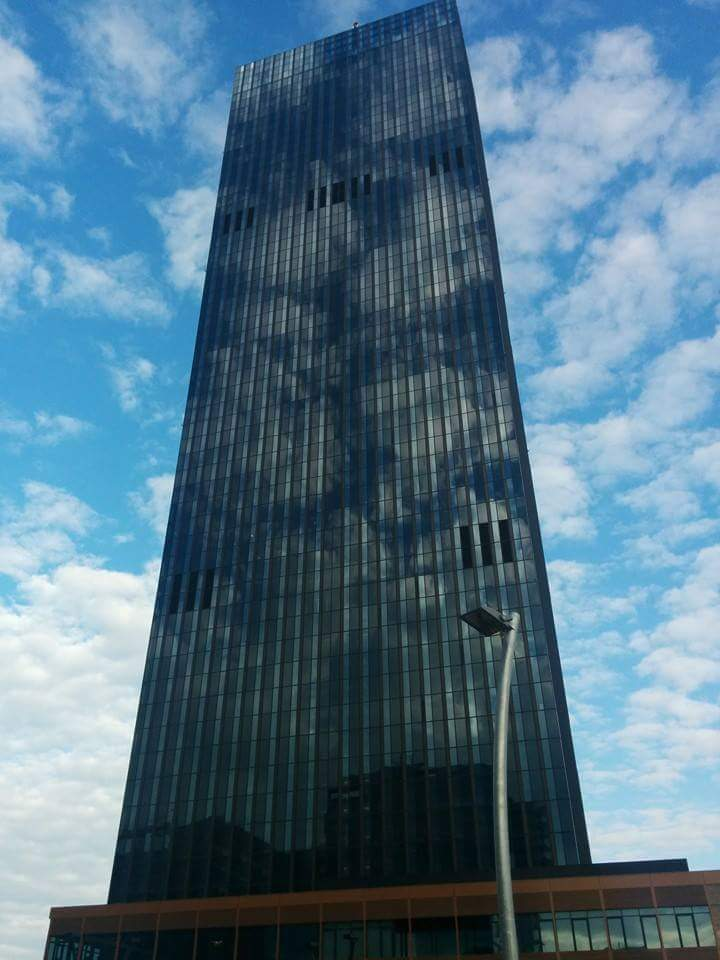
Reflection of the sky on the facade

"The primary aim of the planning was not to set new height records, but to create a well-designed building that impresses with its sophisticated design and high quality. The height of the tower results from the ambition to preserve the attractive aesthetics of a slim tower when building the planned cubic dimensions."

— Architect Dominique Perrault on the DC Towers concept.

The shape was born from the idea of a monolith broken in the middle. This "jagged stone" is recognizable by the wave-like structure on the southeast side, but was only to receive its negative form with Tower 2 and thus come into its own spatially and visually. Due to changed requirements, Tower 2 will not follow the design of Tower 1, so the planned design will not be completed. The two towers will then form a "city gate", with the two halves facing the Danube and standing at a slight angle to each other. The space that will develop between them is crucial for Perrault. Identity and urban space can only be created with several towers. Standing alone, DC Tower 1 is only a good solitaire. Dominique Perrault wanted to build a uniform volume of glass and not a supporting structure with four curtain walls. The black color and the reflections of the surroundings help to take away the tower's texture and weaken the two-dimensional image. The floors that can be read from the outside should recede into the background. The "liquid facade" is modelled on the Danube, as proximity to the water is essential for the architect. It represents great potential for Donau City, but is currently not being properly exploited. The associated stylistic element of the differently offset "waves" is therefore not only found on the outer skin; it also appears repeatedly inside, for example in the hotel rooms.

The glass façade consists of 32,000 m^{2} of solar protection insulating glass and was manufactured in Austria. Of these, 10,000 m^{2} of glass surfaces were screen printed; also to reduce the risk of bird strikes.

The flowing and immaterial character that the exterior reflects was interpreted in the opposite way in the interior. Here, the rooms were to be very present and physically perceptible. In the halls and corridors that are open to the public, for example, the full-surface natural stone surfaces underline the robust aesthetic. The lift lobbies were designed with metal panels, which radiate a warmth that is not typical of the material due to their differently treated surfaces. The public hotel areas in the base building are connected by a "floating" spiral staircase, the stairwell of which simultaneously forms an atrium that tapers towards the top and provides a view of the tower. Its round steps are covered with white Bianco Sivec marble from Macedonia and are tapered at the sides.

=== Structure ===
In addition to a detailed study of the subsoil, the key parameters and basis for the structural design were the susceptibility to wind, both towards the tower and from it. As a result, a model of the tower and its surroundings was built to examine it in the wind tunnel. With regard to the downdrafts that occur in Donau City, the wind comfort in the area close to the ground was also to be optimized. The results of the investigations were slight adaptations to the building and the positioning of umbrella-like structures around the tower. These provide additional protection against sunlight and falling objects.

The reinforced concrete structure is elastic. At the height of the 58th floor, the tower can sway by up to 45 centimeters, and at the top of the antenna by up to one meter. In order to reduce the movement below the limit of perception and to increase user comfort, a vibration absorber in the form of a 305-ton mass pendulum was installed between the 56th and 60th floors. It consists of steel plates and a 54 m^{3} water tank, which ensures the supply of the wall hydrant system in an emergency. The pendulum hangs at the four corner points on two 16 m long steel cables. It is guided by rails, so it swings in defined paths and is coordinated with the slender side of the building. The pendulum always moves in the opposite direction to the natural vibration of the tower. The length of the cable can be variably adjusted to the final natural frequency. However, this only occurred some time after completion, since a newly built structure is initially relatively stiff and only becomes more elastic over time.

So-called outriggers are installed in the building services floors on levels 16/17 and 43/44, which give the DC Tower more stability. Two-meter-thick reinforced concrete ceilings connect the core with the load-bearing external columns and improve the rigidity of the load-bearing system. The outrigger floors are each twice as high as a standard floor, reserved for building services systems and can only be seen from the outside by the grilled air inlet openings in the facade. The outrigger construction as such is not recognizable, however. The cantilevered bay windows on the wave-like southeast side are supported by steel profiles subjected to tension or compression.

=== Environment and services ===
As one of the first Austrian high-rise buildings, the DC Tower 1 was built and equipped according to the energy and sustainability requirements of the EU Commission for a "Green Building" certificate and according to the US LEED system. In January 2015, the tower was awarded the highest quality level, platinum status . During the certification process, 82 out of 110 possible points were achieved.

The assessment takes into account parameters such as sustainable site quality, savings in drinking water consumption, optimized energy consumption, sustainable and resource-saving use of materials, but also comfort and user satisfaction in the workplace. Building energy is reduced by photovoltaic systems and energy-feeding elevators. The tower is powered by green electricity . In the underground car park, alternatively powered cars have the opportunity to "refuel" with the electricity generated by the building.

Rainwater management means that rainwater that falls on the built-up areas is left in the natural water cycle or is used further and is not fed into the sewers. To avoid excessive energy losses of heat or cold, a grid structure is incorporated into every second window. As is usual in modern high-rise buildings, individual (narrow) windows can be opened completely. A perforated sheet is placed in front of them for protection. A concrete core temperature control system was installed in the tower over an area of 22,900 m^{2}. This system uses the mass of the concrete as a heat storage device and enables the resource-saving cooling of the office floors in summer and their heating in winter. Due to the low operating temperature, this system is energy efficient.

The air conditioning systems use a two-stage heat recovery system. The tower's heating requirement is 27.41 kWh/m^{2}.a. In the event of a power failure, there is a 2,000 hp diesel generator. On the roof there is a rail-mounted facade maintenance system, consisting of two cranes, each weighing 30 tons. These maneuver the gondolas used to clean and maintain the glass facade. A complete cleaning of the facade takes around a month. The building services and security systems are monitored from the control center on the 2nd floor. A total of four floors, two each in the lower (floors 16/17) and upper (floors 43/44) areas of the tower, are reserved exclusively for building services systems. The upper technical floor also contains Vienna's highest transformer station of the Wiener Netze . From the outside, these floors can only be recognized by the grilled air supply openings in the facade.

== See also ==
- List of tallest buildings in Austria
- List of tallest buildings in Vienna

Records
Preceded by Millennium Tower	Tallest building in Austria (Tower I); 2014–present 250 metres (820 ft)	Incumbent
