= Gustav Peichl =

Austrian architect and caricaturist (1928–2019)

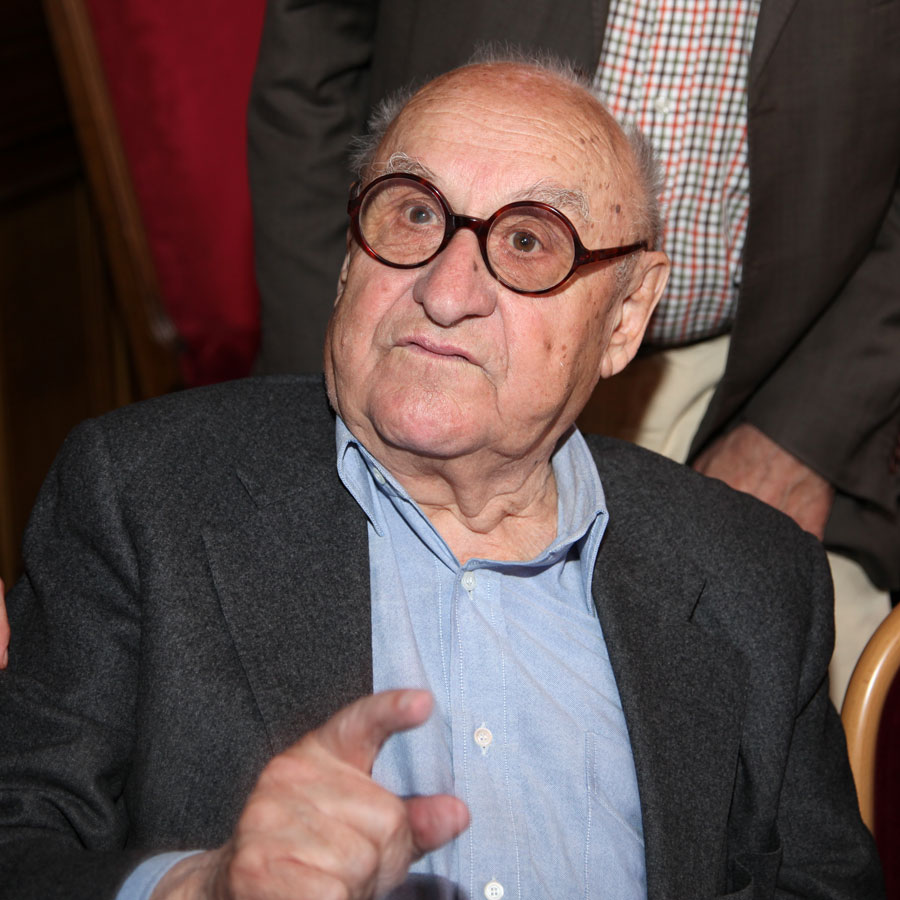
- Gustav Peichl in 2013
- Born: 18 March 1928; Vienna, Austria
- Died: 17 November 2019 (aged 91); Grinzing, Vienna, Austria
- Occupation: Architect

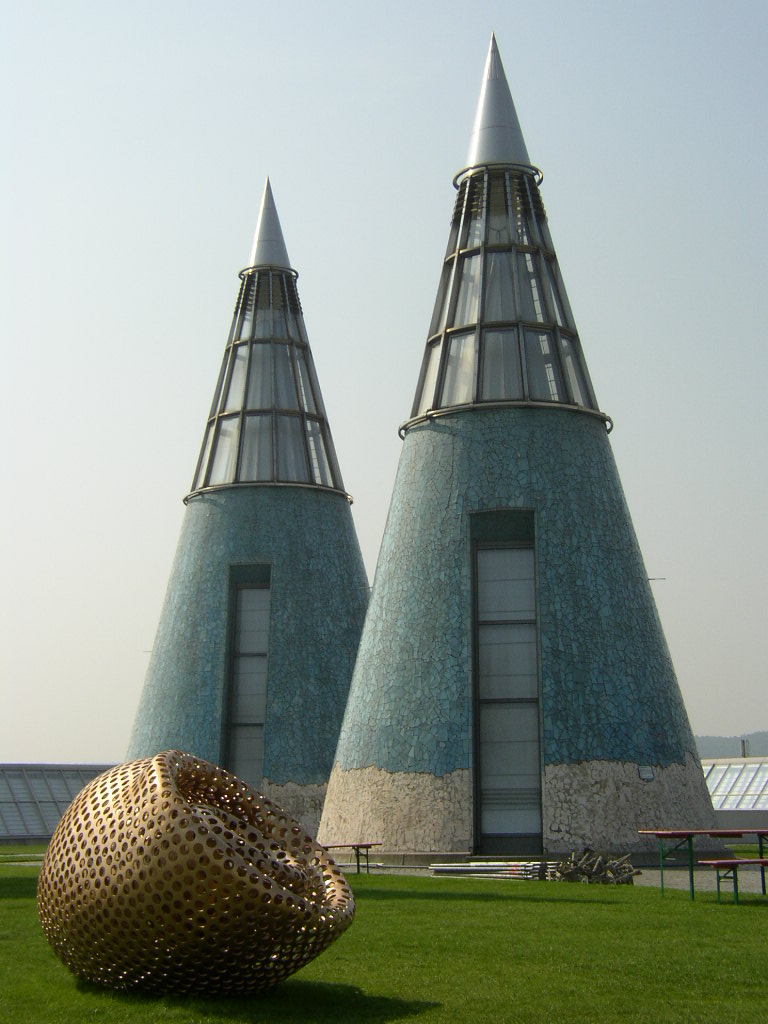
Gustav Peichl museum roofscape

Gustav Peichl (18 March 1928 – 17 November 2019) was an Austrian architect and caricaturist.

== Life ==
He studied at the Academy of Fine Arts Vienna until 1953 and worked in the office of Roland Rainer. To pay for architectural school, he drew caricatures under a pseudonym to protect his identity from the Red Army, which occupied Austria at the time. He first used the name Pei initially and later by the name under which he was best known, Ironimus. He later drew cartoons for major newspapers such as Kurier, Express, Süddeutsche Zeitung and Die Presse.

He opened his own architectural firm in 1955. Peichl built the EFA Radio Satellite Station in Aflenz Austria. He was a member of the international jury that chose Carlos Ott as the architect for the in Opéra Bastille in Paris, in 1983.

He died 17 November 2019 at his home in Grinzing, Vienna, Austria.

== Main works ==
- 1969–82 ORF regional studios, in Dornbirn, Eisenstadt, Graz, Innsbruck, Linz, Salzburg
- 1985–92 Kunst- und Ausstellungshalle der Bundesrepublik Deutschland, Bonn, Germany
- 1987–91 Extension building to the Städel Museum, Frankfurt am Main
- 1997–99 with Boris Podrecca and Rudolf F. Weber: Millennium Tower, Vienna
- 2000–01 Caricature Museum, Krems
