= Millennium Tower (Vienna) =

Second tallest building and fourth tallest structure in Austria

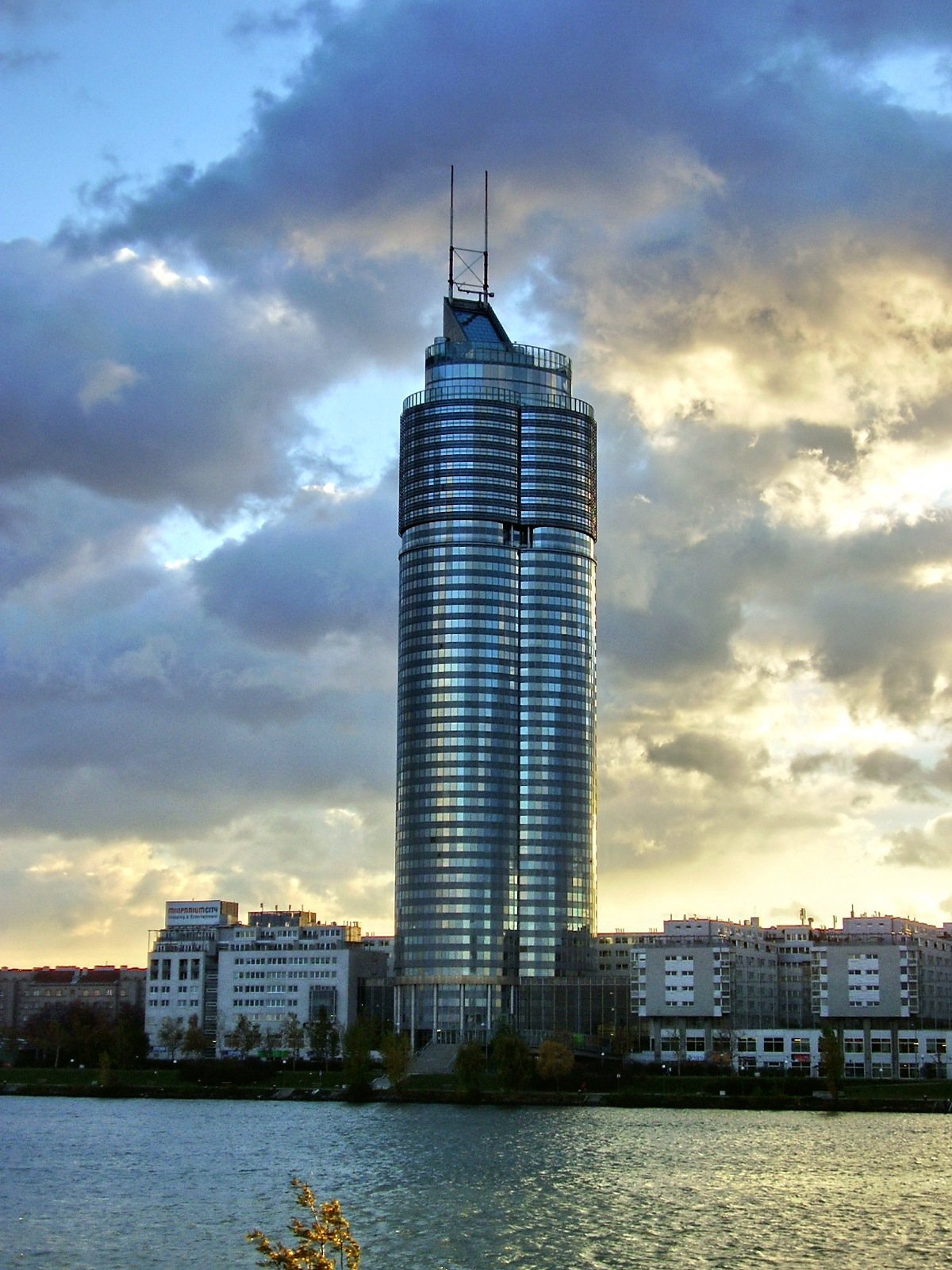
- Millennium Tower, Vienna

General information
- Status: Completed
- Location: Vienna, Austria
- Coordinates: 48°14′24″N 16°23′13″E
- Construction started: 1997
- Completed: 1999
- Owner: Münchmeyer Petersen Capital

Height
- Height: 202 m (663 ft)

Technical details
- Floor count: 50
- Floor area: 47,200 m^{2} (508,000 ft^{2})
- Lifts/elevators: 9 (+ 1 freight elevator)

Design and construction
- Architects: Gustav Peichl, Boris Podrecca, Rudolf Weber
- Developer: ARGE Habau - Voestalpine - MCE

Website
- http://www.millenniumtower.at

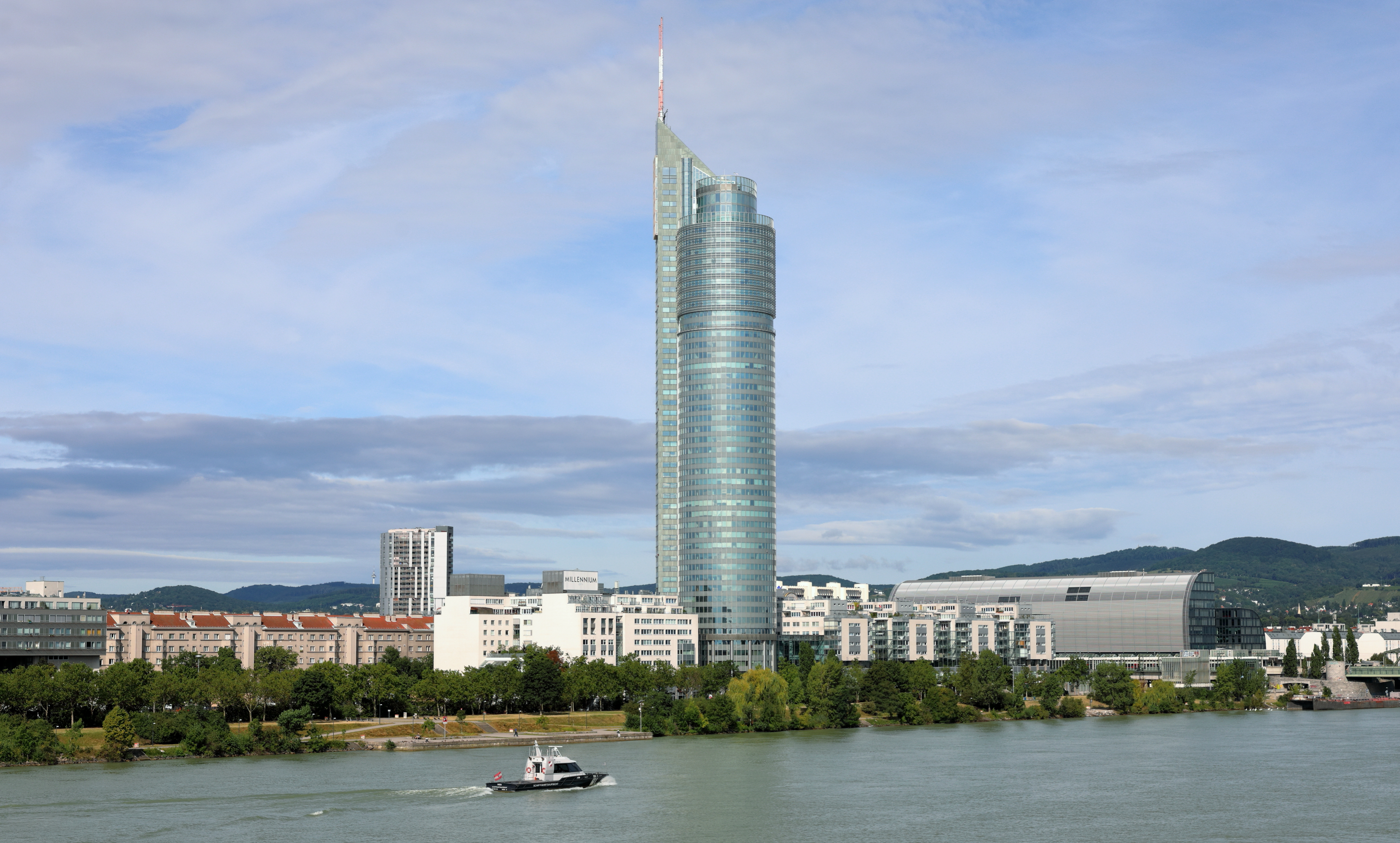
Millennium Tower, Vienna

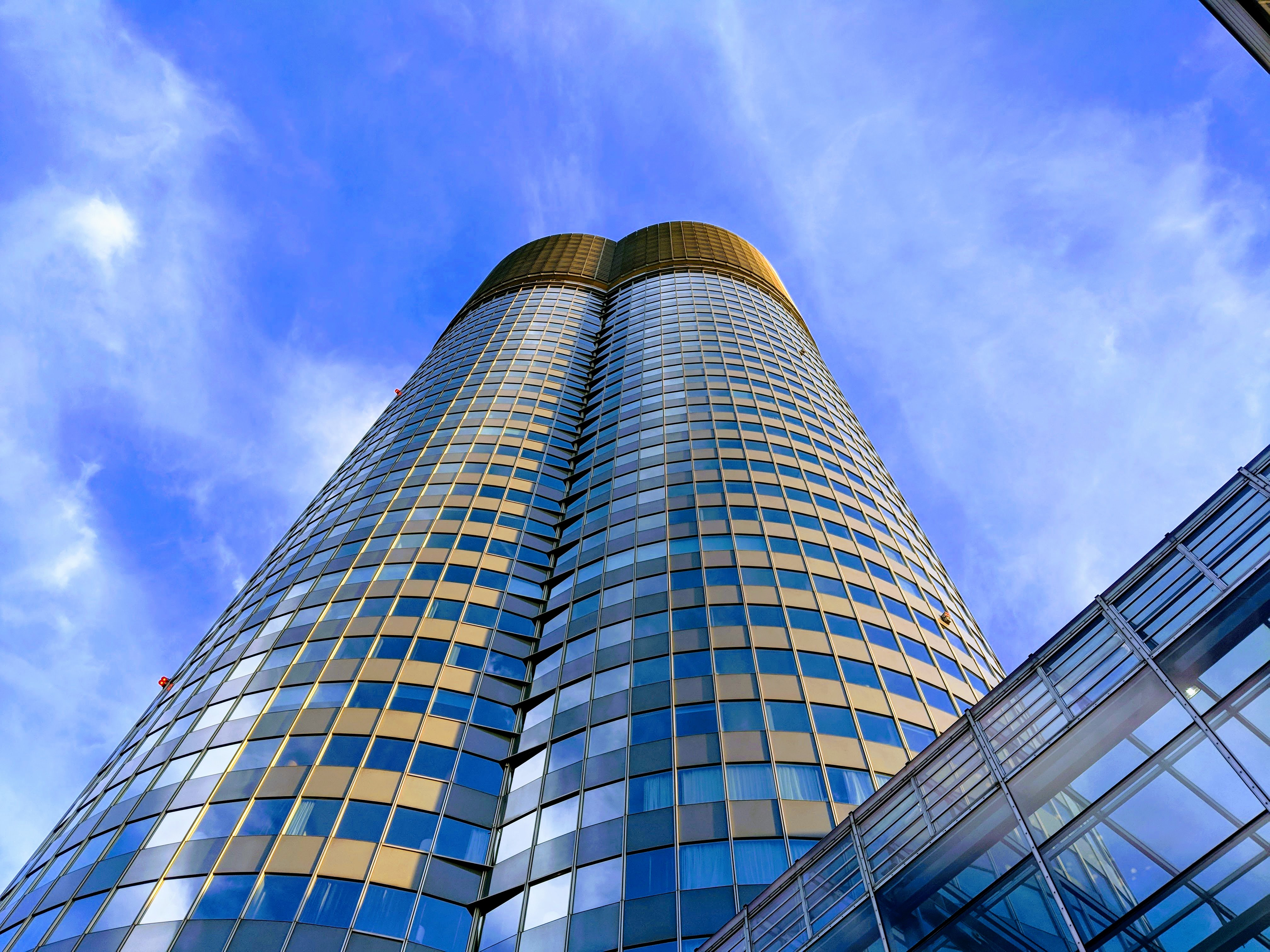
View from below

The Millennium Tower is a mixed-use skyscraper in Vienna, Austria. Built between 1997 and 1999, the building stands at 202 m (663 ft) tall with 50 floors and is currently the second tallest building in Austria. The tower is located at Handelskai 94–96 in the Brigittenau 20th district.

Millennium Tower was designed by the architects Gustav Peichl, Boris Podrecca and Rudolf Weber. The tower has 50 floors, serves both commercial and residential purposes, and is the focal point of a complex known as "Millennium City". It was completed in 1999 for the coming of the third millennium. The office tower has a gross floor area of 47,200 m^{2} (508,000 ft^{2}), of which 38,500 m^{2} (414,000 ft^{2}) is used as office space. The remaining area is to 2 levels are generally available and is used for a shopping center (Millennium City), restaurants and a multiplex cinema (UCI). The Millennium Tower was built in an extremely short construction time: Thanks to efficient organization of all work steps and modern building techniques have created an average of 2 ½ floors a week and the building completed in 1999.

== Architecture ==
The shape of the tower is formed by two clasped each other fully glazed cylinder which is supported by a steel composite structure. The Millennium Tower was designed by the architects Gustav Peichl, Boris Podrecca and Rudolf F. Weber.

The operating contractor was the consortium Habau - Voestalpine - MCE.

== Tenants ==
In the Millennium Tower, around 136 companies have rented office space, including major international companies such as Xerox, most look from there after their Eastern European activities, like many other international companies in Vienna they have advantages from the good Austrian relations to eastern European Countries. Other tenants include: inter alia Cirquent, Trivadis, CSC, Carlson Wagonlit, Inode (UTA), Agip and Cisco.

== Owner ==
Owner George Stumpf sold the Millennium Tower in Vienna on 25 July 2003 along with the associated Millennium City to the Hamburg-based issuing house MPC (Münchmeyer Capital). The purchase price was 360 million euros, which is close to 15-times the annual income of 24.5 million euro (2002) corresponds to the Millennium City, which is next to the offices in the Tower and form a shopping center, residential buildings and the largest cinema complex in Austria. Taking into account the building costs of 145 million Euros, there is a profit of 215 million euros.

== MCN ==
As part of the building was also built up its own internal telecommunications infrastructure, in which case the MCN Millennium Communication Network AG acted as a telephone and Internet service provider. With shared use of Telekom Austria infrastructure, this could also serve as provider countrywide. As MCN ran into financial difficulties in 2000, the existing network was acquired by Inode (UTA) Austria.

== See also ==
- List of tallest buildings in Vienna

Records
Preceded by Vienna International Centre (Building A)	Tallest building in Austria (Tower I); 1999–2014; 202 metres (663 ft)	Succeeded by DC Towers (Tower I)
