= DC Tower 3 =

Skyscraper in Vienna, Austria

- DC Turm 3 (German)
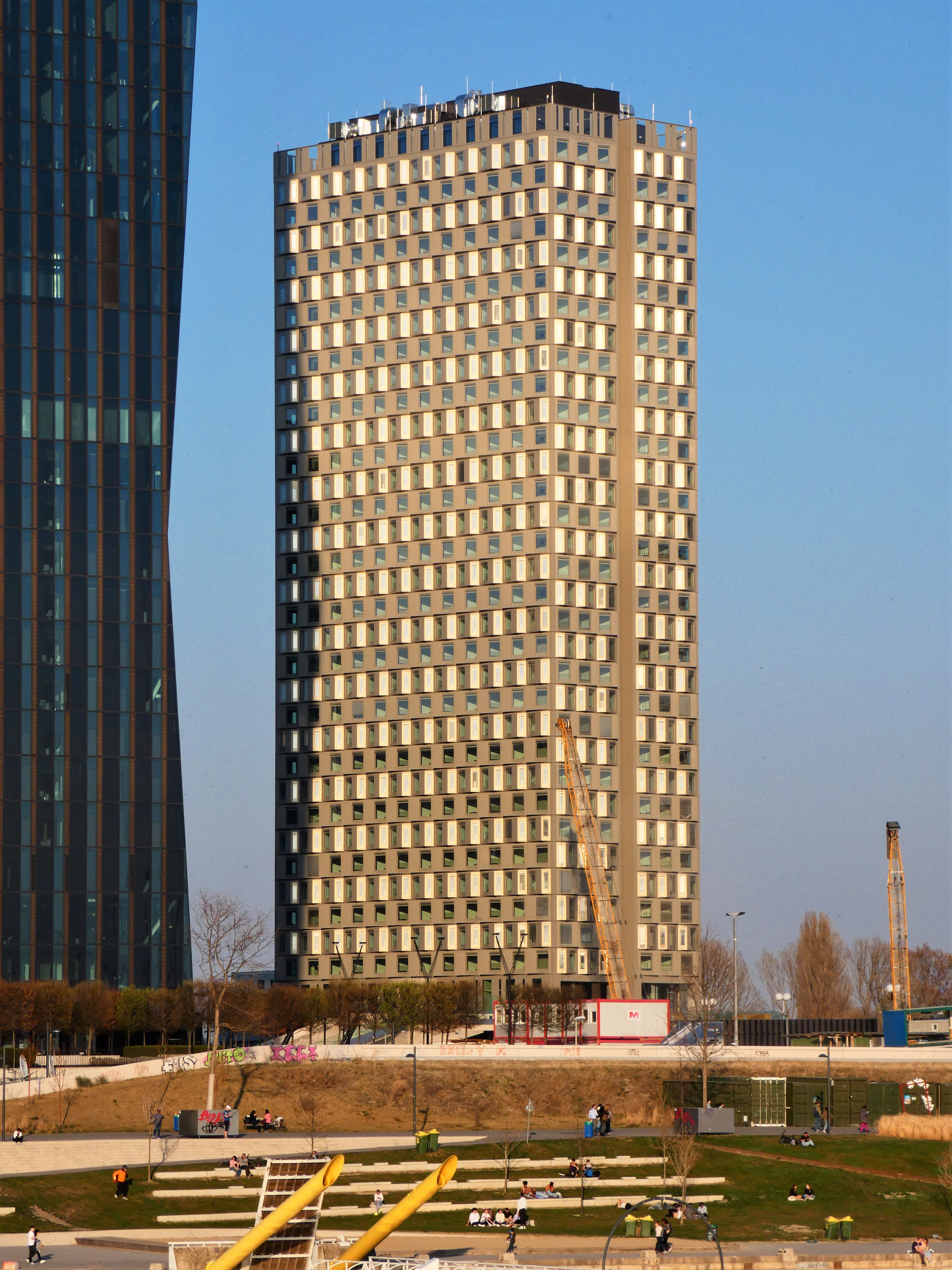

General information
- Status: Completed
- Type: Residential (serviced apartments)
- Location: Vienna, Austria, 3 Donau City Str., Vienna, Austria
- Coordinates: 48.23158°N 16.41486°E
- Construction started: 2019
- Completed: 2022
- Owner: Greystar Real Estate Partners

Height
- Roof: 109.4 m (359 ft)

Technical details
- Structural system: Concrete
- Floor count: 34
- Floor area: 22,800 m^{2} (245,000 sq ft)
- Lifts/elevators: Kone

Design and construction
- Architect: Dietrich Untertrifaller Architekten
- Developer: S + B Gruppe
- Structural engineer: Doka GmbH (framework)
- Main contractor: Bauunternehmung Granit

The DC Tower 3 (German: DC Turm 3) is a high-rise residential building in the Donau City district of Vienna, Austria. Built between 2019 and 2022, the tower stands at 109.4 m (359 ft) tall with 34 floors and is the current 17th tallest building in Austria.

== History ==
=== Architecture ===
The DC Tower 3 is a high-rise building used as a student residence, which was built in the 22nd district of Vienna, Donaustadt, between Wagramer Straße, Reichsbrücke and the tracks of the U1 subway line. The building shares its proximity with the DC Towers Complex. It was built by the S+B Group from 2019 to 2022 according to plans by the Austrian architectural firm Dietrich/Untertrifaller and sold to the US real estate company Greystar Real Estate Partners for over 100 million euros. The tower's official height is of 109.4 meters and is supported by pylons that reach down to 35 m. Its 22,800 m^{2} of usable space is spread over 34 upper floors and five lower floors. In addition to 832 apartments, the building also houses a fitness studio. It also has a roof terrace.

The flat slab reinforced concrete framework is supported by the core in the longitudinal direction or by walls in the transverse direction. The window alcoves are manufactured as modules and put together at the location. Aluminium slats define the façade in the basement levels, while from the ground floor upward, the tower is covered in aluminium panels.

The accommodations feature a sanitary unit, a workspace, and a kitchenette. The materiality is confined to three primary components: white concrete, wood, and tiles. Drapes, rugs, illumination, and adornments establish a warm ambiance. The projections of the three-dimensional warped facade elements are converted into wooden nooks on the interior that function as heated seating windows.

== Gallery ==
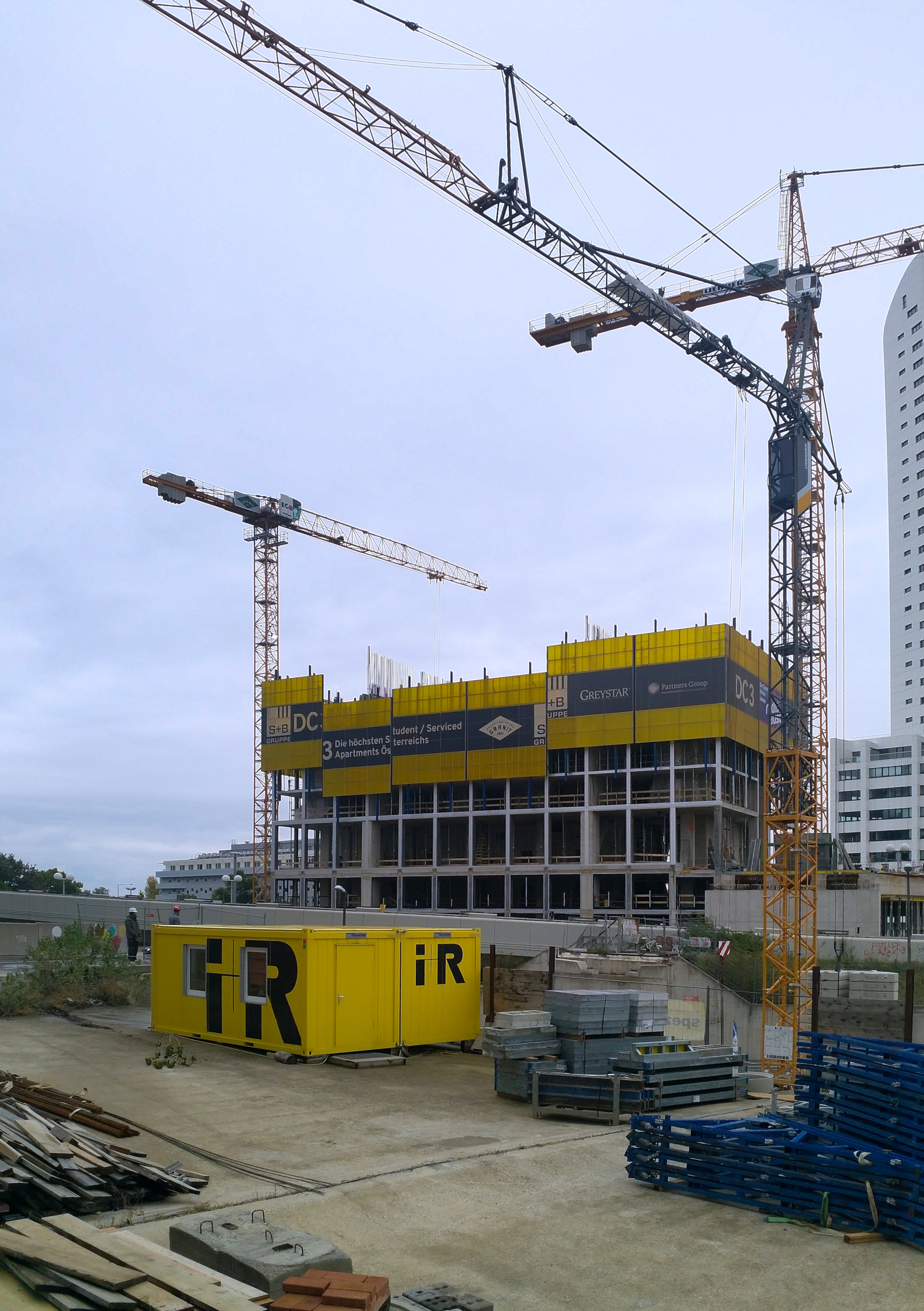
Construction progress in October 2020 ...

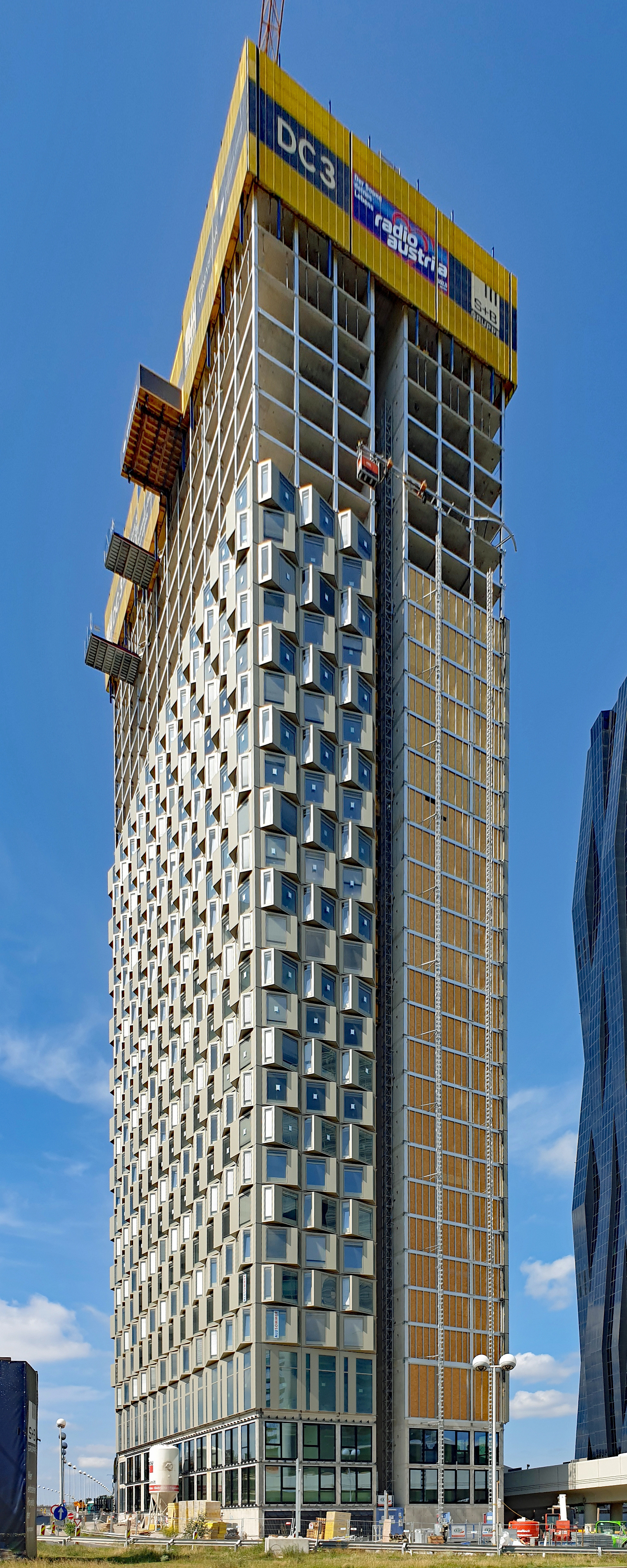
... and July 2021

Facade details

== See also ==
- List of tallest buildings in Austria
