= Hotel Melia Barcelona Sky =

Skyscraper in Barcelona

Coordinates: 41°24′22.24″N 2°12′2.86″E

Hotel Meliá Barcelona Sky
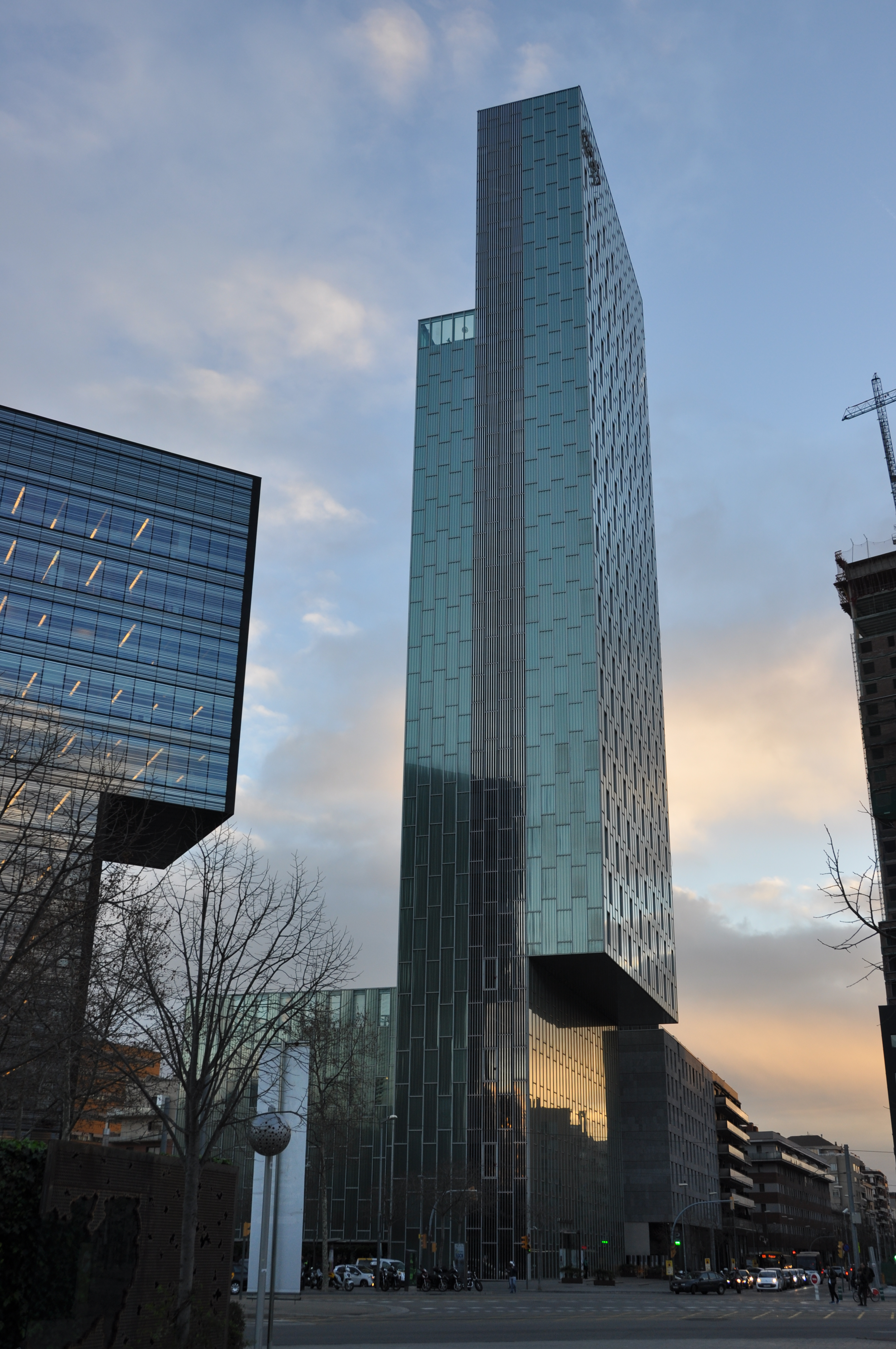
- Interactive map of the Hotel Meliá Barcelona Sky area

General information
- Status: Completed
- Type: hotel
- Location: Carrer de Pere IV, 272; Barcelona, Catalonia, Spain
- Construction started: 2004
- Completed: 2008

Height
- Height: 116 m (381 ft)

Technical details
- Floor count: 31

Design and construction
- Architect: Dominique Perrault

The Hotel Meliá Barcelona Sky is a skyscraper designed by Dominique Perrault located in Barcelona, Catalonia, Spain. The building is 116 metres (381 ft) tall and has 31 floors and 258 rooms. It is the fourth-tallest building in Barcelona after Torre Mapfre, Hotel Arts, and Torre Agbar.

The building is located at the junction of Avinguda Diagonal and carrer de Pere IV, in the district of el Poblenou.

The hotel was conquered by Alain Robert on June 13, 2017 and it took him Twenty minutes. His stunt was repeated by Marcin Banot on August 2, 2018 and it took him 59 minutes.

== See also ==
- List of tallest buildings and structures in Barcelona
