= Innsbruck Town Hall =

City hall of Innsbruck, Austria

Coordinates: 47°15′56″N 11°23′38″E

Innsbruck Town Hall is the building of the local government of the city of Innsbruck, Austria. The first building to house the local government was built in 1358, and was the first town hall in Tyrol, now known as Altes Rathaus. In 1897 the city administration moved to a new building, a former hotel donated to the city by the wholesaler Leonhard Lang. After the new town hall (Neues Rathaus) was severely damaged in World War II, it was rebuilt in 1947-48.

== New town hall complex ==
In 1996, an international architectural design competition was organised for a new town hall complex. The competition was won by the French architect Dominique Perrault. Completed in 2002 the building complex also incorporates a restaurant, hotel and a shopping arcade, known as Rathausgallerien. It was developed as a public–private partnership in which the municipality supplied the land while a private consortium carried out the restoration of the old town hall building and construction of the new buildings, including 6,000 square metres of office space for the city administration.

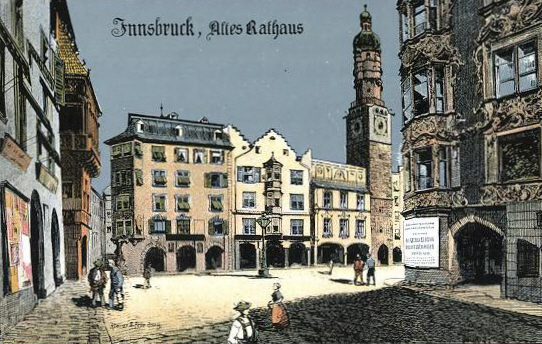
Old town hall (Altes Rathaus) as seen on a postcard from 1934.

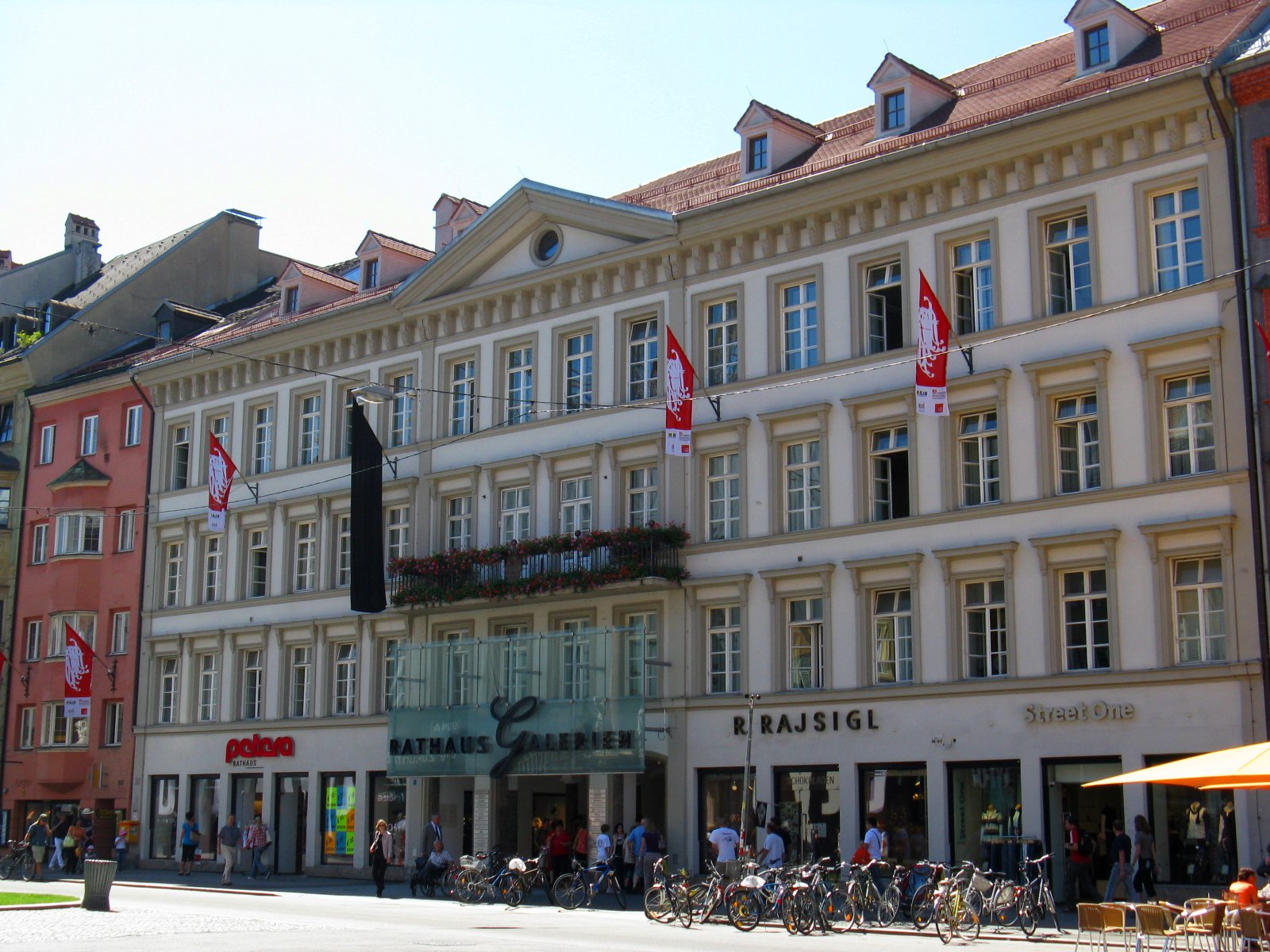
New town hall (Neues Rathaus).

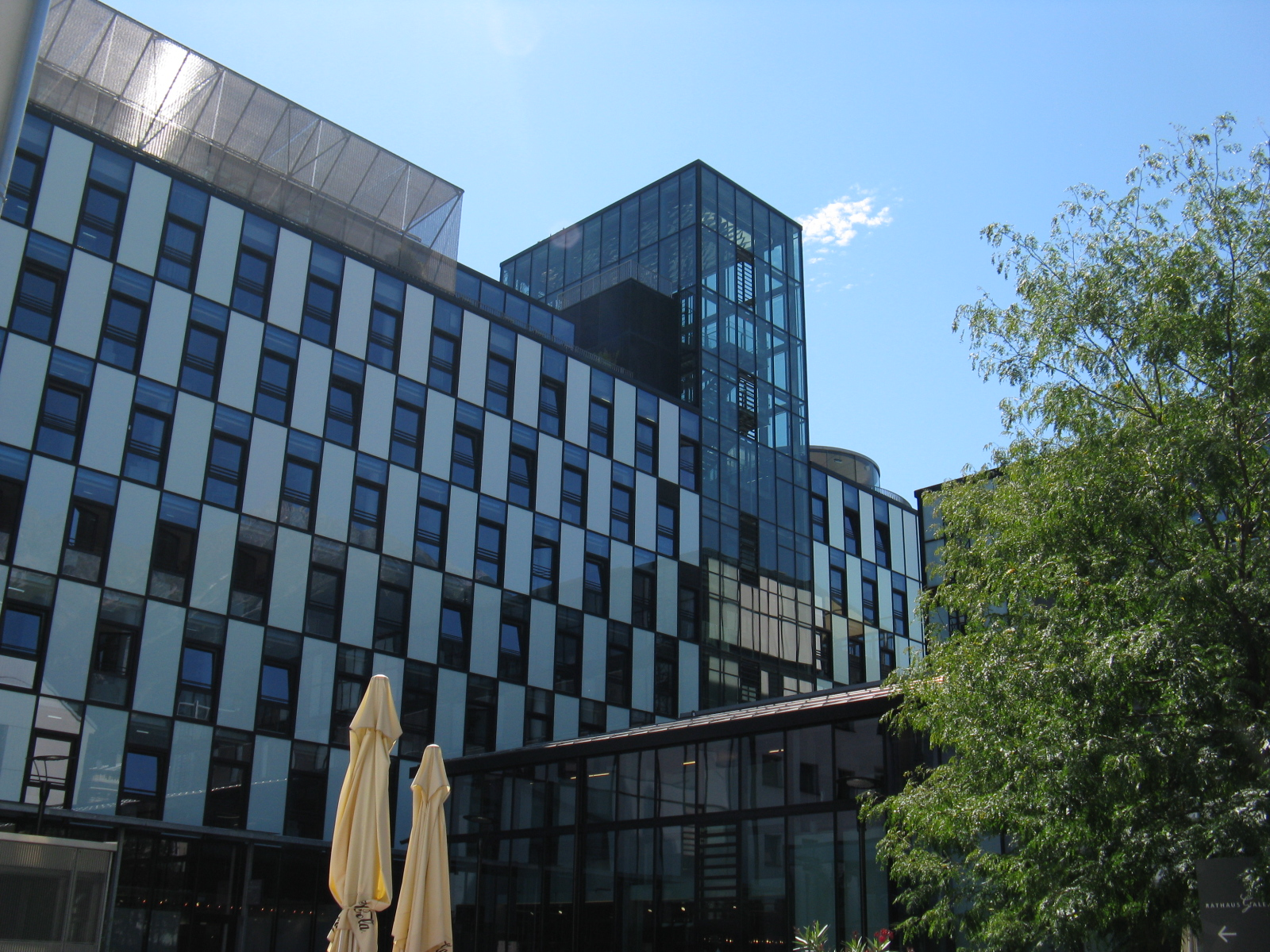
New town hall extension by Dominique Perrault.

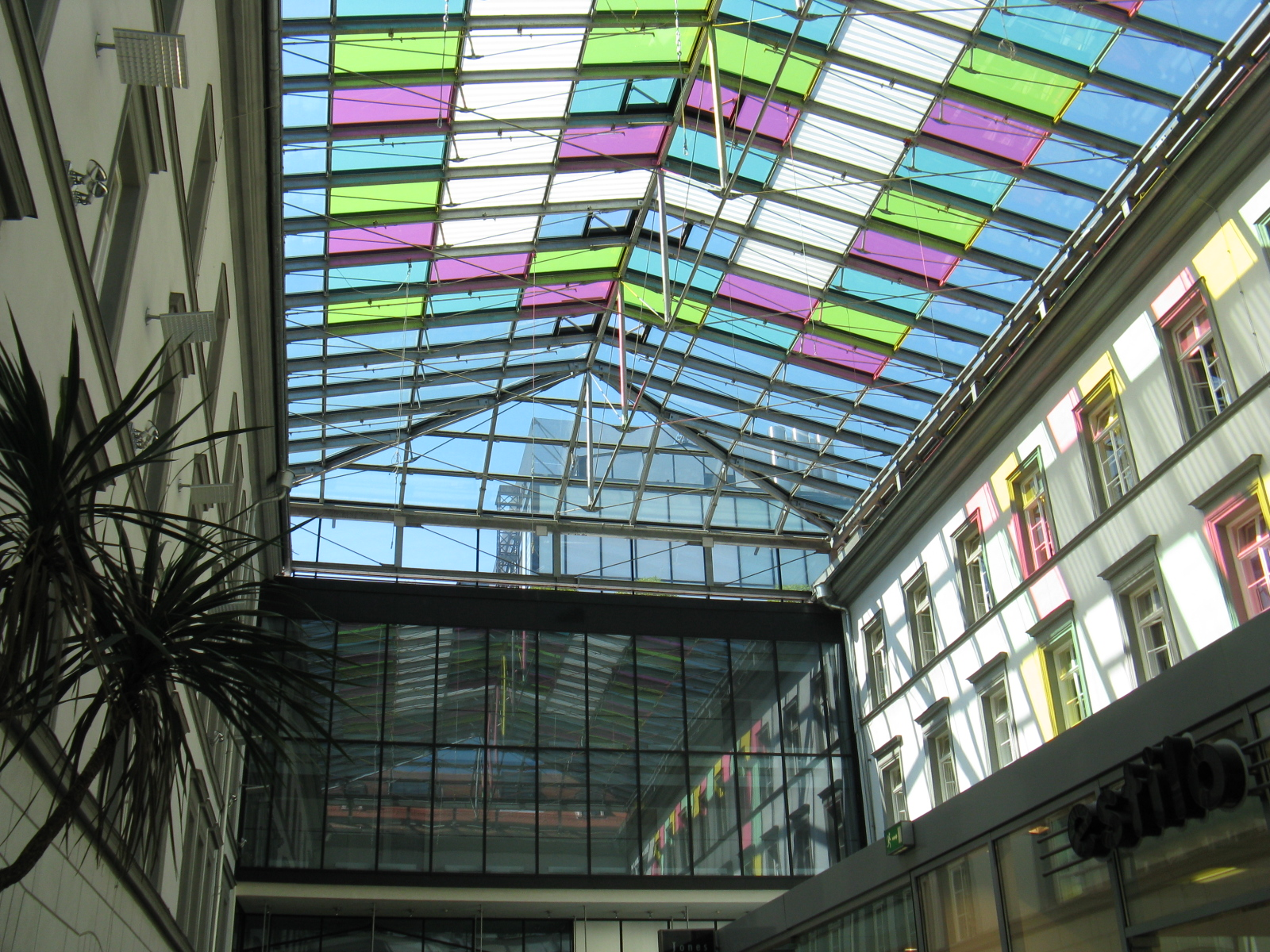
Shopping arcade that is part of the town hall complex completed in 2002.
