= Dominique Perrault =

French architect and urban planner (born 1953)

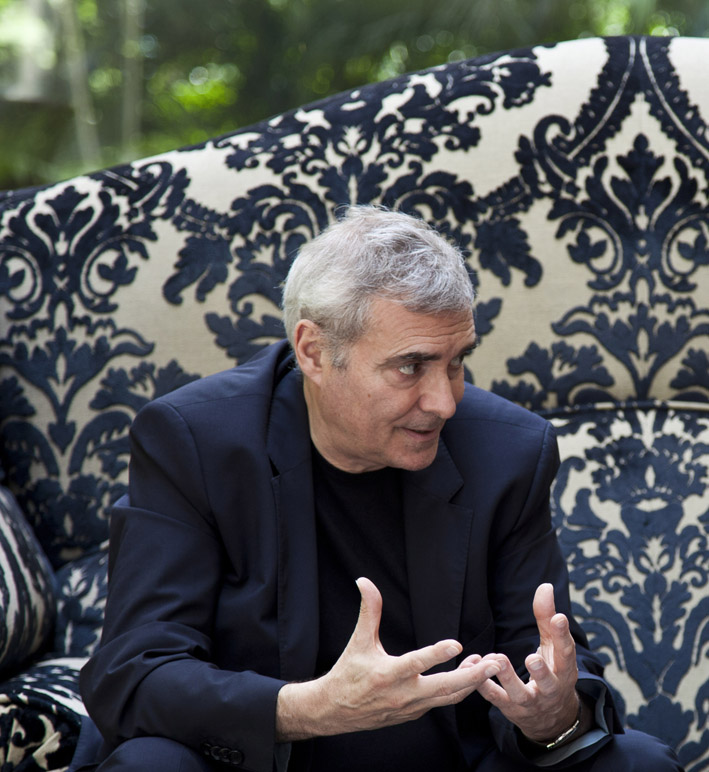
- Born: 9 April 1953 (age 73); Clermont-Ferrand, France
- Education: DPLG Architect, Paris in 1978
- Occupation: Architect
- Awards: French Silver medal for town planning (1990), Great French National Prize of Architecture (1993), European Union Prize for Contemporary Architecture (1997), AFEX prize (2010), Grande médaille d’or de l’Académie d’Architecture (2010), Member of the Academie des Beaux-Arts, Paris (2015), Praemium Imperiale (2015)
- Practice: Dominique Perrault Architecture (DPA)
- Buildings: French National Library Olympic Velodrome and Olympic swimming pool, Berlin; Fourth and fifth extensions of the Palais de la Cour de Justice, Luxembourg; Olympic Tennis Stadium, Madrid; Ewha Womans University, Seoul Fukoku Tower, Osaka

Dominique Perrault (French: [dɔminik pɛʁo]; born 9 April 1953 in Clermont-Ferrand) is a French architect and urban planner. He became world known for the design of the French National Library, distinguished with the Silver medal for town planning in 1992 and the Mies van der Rohe Prize in 1996. In 2010 he was awarded the gold medal by the French Academy of Architecture for all his work. He was named as the 2015 Praemium Imperiale Laureate for Architecture.

He received his Diploma in Architecture at the Ecole Nationale Supérieure des Beaux-Arts in Paris in 1978. He also holds a postgraduate diplomas in Town Planning from the Ecole supérieure des Ponts et Chaussée and History from the Ecole des Hautes Etudes en Sciences Sociales.

He currently heads Dominique Perrault Architecture (DPA) in Paris.

== Biography ==
Leading figure of French architecture, Dominique Perrault is professor at the Ecole Polytechnique Fédérale de Lausanne, a lecturer in France and abroad and a member of the Conseil scientifique de l’Atelier International du Grand Paris since 2012. After winning the competition of the Bibliothèque Nationale de France in 1989, he realized, amongst other projects, the Olympic Velodrome and Olympic swimming pool in Berlin, the fourth and fifth extension of the seat of the Court of Justice of the European Union in Luxembourg, the Olympic Tennis Stadium in Madrid, the Ewha Womans University or the Fukoku Tower in Osaka. His work is exhibited in major museums around the world. A solo exhibition showing all of his work was held at the Centre Georges Pompidou in Paris in 2008. He was also appointed Commissioner of the French pavilion architecture section of the Venice Biennale in 2010. Dominique Perrault leads in parallel significant heritage rehabilitation projects including those of Longchamp Racecourse in Paris, Dufour Pavilion at Versailles and La Poste du Louvre in Paris. In spring 2014, Dominique Perrault inaugurated the tallest tower of Austria in Vienna, the DC Tower 1, icon of the new business district and the Grand Théâtre des Cordeliers in the historical city of Albi, south of France. In December 2016, Dominique Perrault and Philippe Bélaval, President of the Centre des monuments nationaux, handed over to the President of the Republic and the Mayor of Paris the study and orientation mission entrusted to them in December 2015 to prefigure the Île de la Cité by 2040.

== Approach ==
Four specific conceptual features were highlighted by the University of Architecture and Urbanism in Bucharest in May 2013 who granted Dominique Perrault the title of "Doctor Honoris Causa". "The first feature, which is tightly connected to an imperative need of enriching the architectural language, regards the eloquent interpretation of some sources coming from artistic minimalism and conceptual art. With Dominique Perrault, the architectural design vocabulary is heading towards a reduction of syntax, not of morphology. The second concerns his open, flexible approach that accepts uncertainties and rejects dogmatism and the critique of the privileged role of style and composition in the modern architectural discourse. The third feature highlights the idea of how architecture should be understood as a part of landscape within the topography of fundamental relations. The fourth emphasizes his experience with space and materiality. Being inspired by the lesson of modernism, the curtain façades, detached from structure and enhanced by light, transparent or translucent screens of glass or metal seem to be a tribute to contemporary technologies, yet are not subservient to them. Innovation often penetrates the engineering level." According to Frederic Migayrou, "All of Dominique Perrault’s work questions the figural aspect of architecture, its ability to provide meaning, to build a dynamic image woven out of social and cultural values. […] Dominique Perrault weaves his position between rationalism that seeks to articulate laws for the composition of typological elements, and a structuralist understanding of architectural syntax, thereby increasing the possibilities of interplay between very disparate scales of symbolic values." At the crossroads of disciplines, Luis Fernandez-Galiano reminds that "it is frequent to describe Perrault’s work in terms of the great tradition of French geometric monumentality; it is inevitable to relate his bold gestures in this area with that affirmative urbanism which treats nature as voluntary geography; and it is necessary to interpret the almost innocent simplicity of his fundamental drawings in the light of the conceptual or minimal practices which extend up to the limits of ‘land art’ and ‘arte povera’.

== Built projects ==
Industrial Hotel Berlier, architect: Dominique Perrault

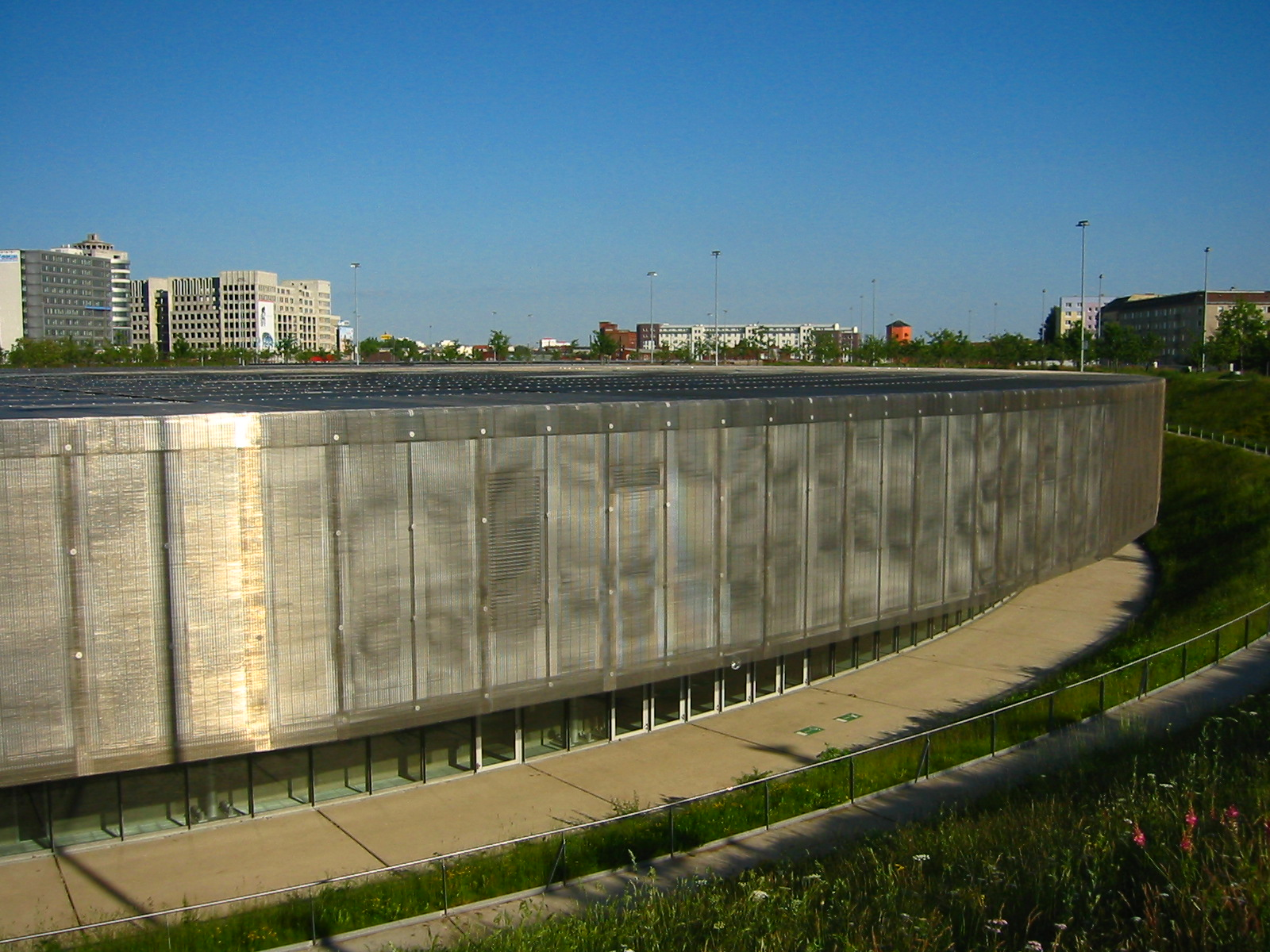
Berlin - Velodrom (1992-1999)

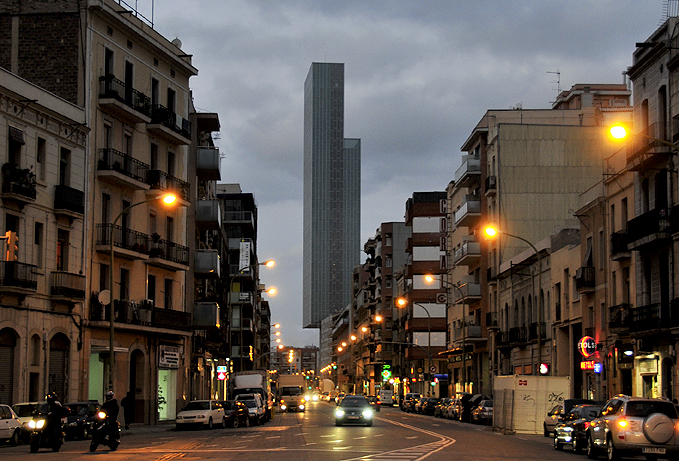
ME Barcelona hotel (1999-2008)

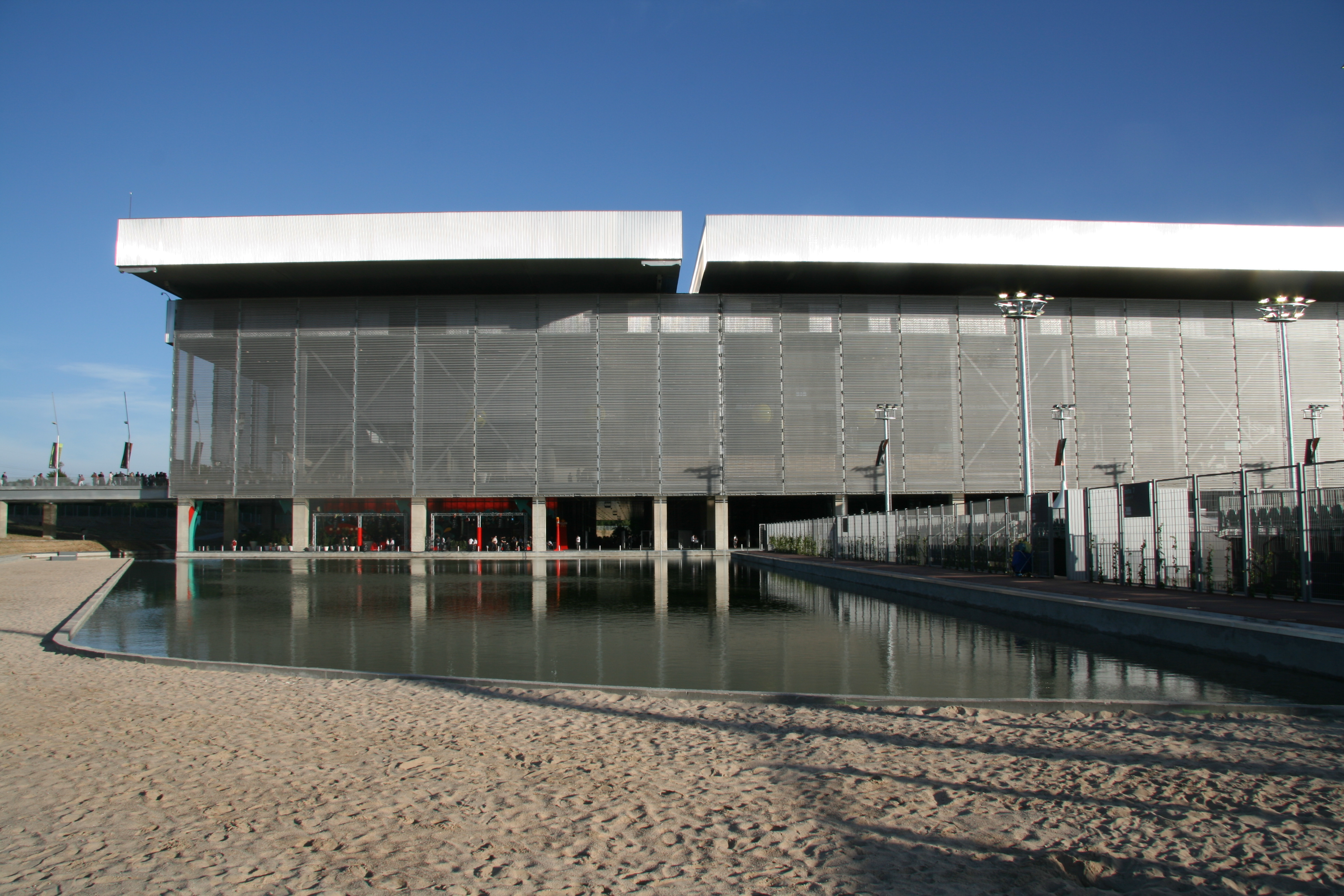
Caja Mágica Olympic Tennis Stadium, Madrid (2002-09)

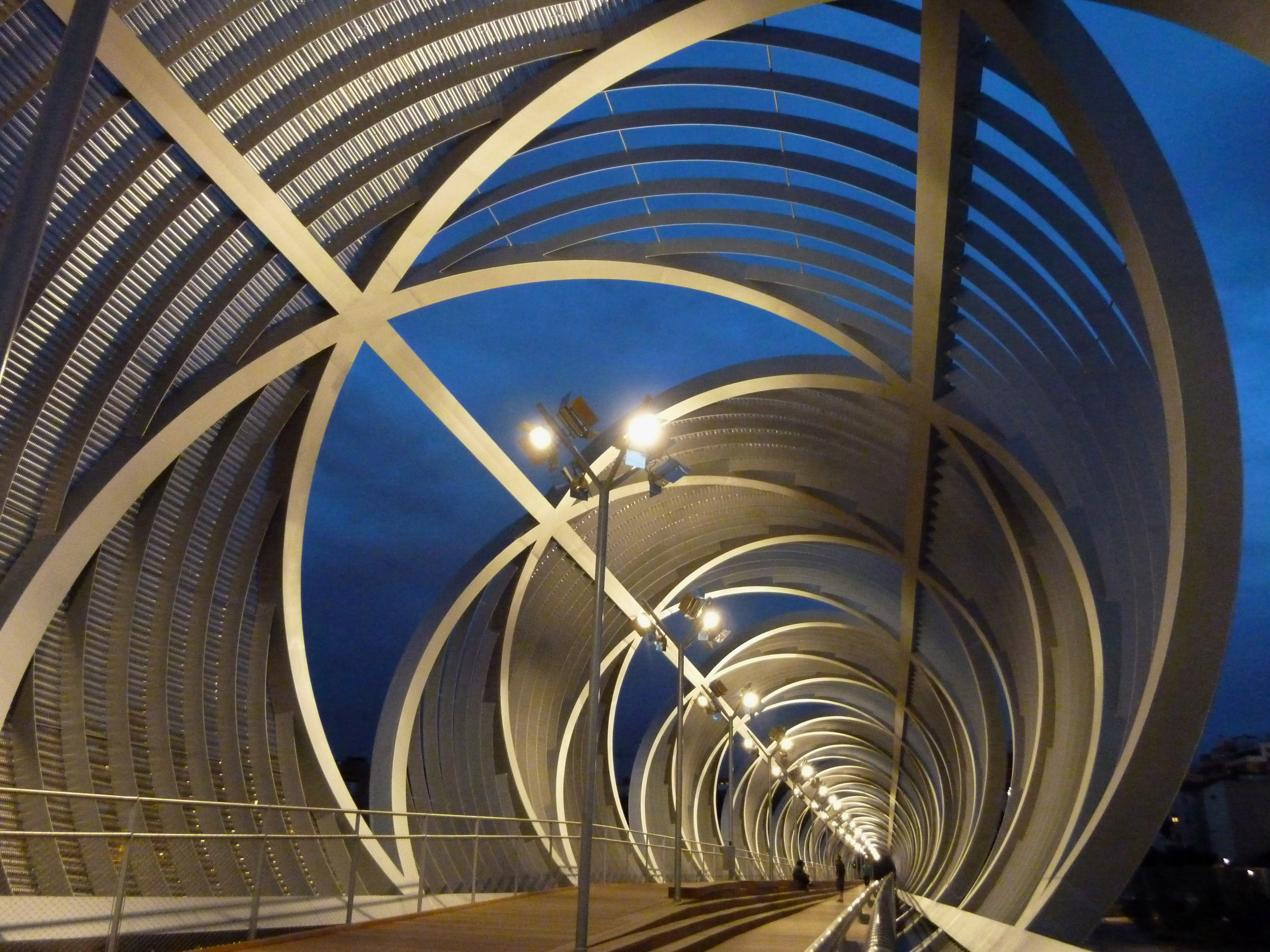
Arganzuela footbridge, Madrid, (2008-11)

- 1981-1983: Someloir factory, Châteaudun, France
- 1983-1986: Housing estate «Les Caps Horniers», Rezé-lès-Nantes, France
- 1984-1987: ESIEE – Academy for engineers of electronics and electrical engineering, Marne-la-Vallée, France
- 1986-1990: Multi-storey industrial building « Hôtel Industriel Jean-Baptiste Berlier », Paris, France
- 1987-1993: Water processing plant for SAGEP, Ivry-sur-Seine, France
- 1988-1991: Conference center Usinor-Sacilor, Saint-Germain-en-Laye, France
- 1988-1991: Apartment building «Le Louis Lumière», Saint-Quentin-en-Yvelines, France
- 1988-1994: Meuse Department Headquarters, Bar-le-Duc, France
- 1989-1993: Mayenne Departmental Archives, Laval, France
- 1989-1995: French National Library, Paris, France
- 1991 : Galerie Denise René, Paris, France
- 1992-1999: Olympic Velodrome and Olympic swimming pool, Berlin, Germany
- 1993-1995: Technical center of books, Bussy Saint-Georges, France
- 1995-1997: The Great Greenhouse for the Cité des Sciences et de l’Industrie, Paris, France
- 1996-2004: Innsbruck Town Hall, Austria
- 1996-2019: Fourth and fifth extensions of the EU's Palais de la Cour de Justice, Luxembourg
- 1997-1999: APLIX factory- Industrial manufacturing unit, Le Cellier, Nantes, France
- 1997-2001: Lucie Aubrac Multimedia Library, Vénissieux, France
- 1998-2007: Montigalà sport complex, Badalona, Barcelona, Spain
- 1999-2003: Three supermarkets for MPREIS group, Wattens, Zirl, Austria
- 1999-2004: Piazza Gramsci, Cinisello Balsamo, Milan, Italy
- 1999-2008: ME Barcelona Hotel, Barcelona, Spain
- 1999-2009: Hines office building, Barcelona, Spain
- 2000-2002: Parking garage Emile Durkheim, Paris, France
- 2001-2004: GKD-USA Factory, Cambridge, Maryland, USA
- 2002-2005: Café Lichtblick, terrace of town hall, Innsbruck, Austria
- 2002-2009: Olympic Tennis Stadium, Manzanares Park, Madrid, Spain
- 2004: Design of Friedrich-Ebert-Platz, Düren, Germany
- 2004-2006: Nô Theater, Niigata, Japan
- 2004-2007: Factory Rehabilitation for Dominique Perrault Architecture, Paris, France
- 2004-2008: Ewha Womans University, Seoul, South Korea
- 2004-2014: DC Towers 1, Donau City, Vienna, Austria
- 2005-2009: Office building, Boulogne Billancourt, France
- 2005-2008: Priory Park pavilion, Reigate, United Kingdom
- 2005-2009: Metropolitan Hotel, Perpignan, France
- 2005-2012: Housing, offices and shops, Zac Euralille 2, Lille, France
- 2006-2009: Office building, Onix, Lille, France
- 2006-2009: NH- Fiera Milano 4 star Hotel, Milan, Italy
- 2006-2010: Fukoku Tower, Osaka, Japan
- 2006-2012: Rouen Sports Palace, France
- 2007-2010: Krisztina Palace Facades, Budapest, Hungary
- 2007-2011: Housing and offices «La Liberté», Groningen, Netherlands
- 2007-2014: B&B hotel, Paris, France
- 2008-2011: Arganzuela footbridge, Madrid, Spain
- 2009: Sammode office building, Paris, France
- 2009-2011: Residential complex, Jeju Island, South Korea
- 2009-2014: Albi Grand Theater, France
- 2011 : Installation «Open Box» for the Gwangju Biennale, South Korea
- 2011-2013: BnF MK2 – Commercial development of the French National Library, site François Mitterrand, Paris, France
- 2011-2013: Ecole Polytechnique Fédérale de Lausanne. Rehabilitation / extension of the former Library (BI), Lausanne, Switzerland

== Main current projects ==
- 2013-2023: Villejuif IGR Station / Grand Paris Express, France
- 2013-2018: Construction of mixed-use buildings, Zürich, Switzerland
- 2012-2018: Repurposing of La Poste du Louvre building, Paris, France
- 2009-2018: Urban redevelopment of the main station area, Locarno, Switzerland
- 2005-2018: Construction of the Convention Centre and Exhibition Hall, Leon, Spain
- 2011-2017: Refurbishment of the Longchamp Racecourse, Paris, France
- 2011-2016: Rehabilitation and extension of the M&E hall, Ecole Polytechnique Fédérale de Lausanne, Lausanne, Switzerland
- 2004-2016: Piazza Garibaldi, Naples, Italy
- 2004-2016: Vienna DC Towers, Vienna, Austria
- 2012-2015: Esplanade Tower, Fribourg, Switzerland
- 2011-2015: Repurposing of the Pavillon Dufour, Château de Versailles, France
- 2007-2015: Refurbishment of the Pont de Sèvres towers, Boulogne-Billancourt, France

== Cancelled project ==
- The New Mariinsky Theatre, St Petersburg, Russia - the project won the competition in 2003 but was cancelled in 2007 because of disagreement on the construction process between Perrault and Russian bureaucrats.
