= Arganzuela Footbridge =

Footbridge in Madrid

Arganzuela Footbridge Pasarela de Arganzuela
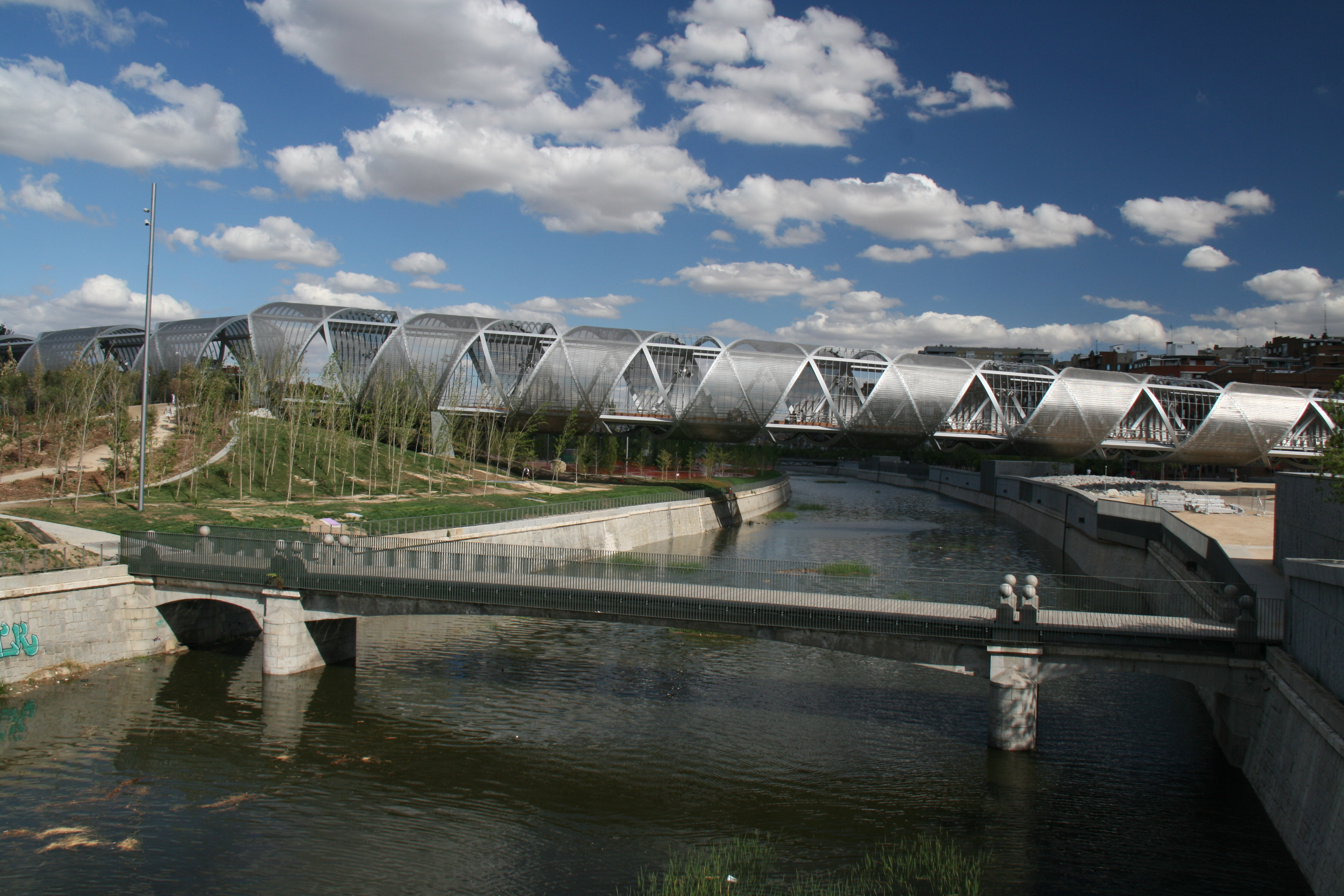
- Coordinates: 40°23′42″N 3°42′17″W
- Crosses: Manzanares
- Locale: Madrid, Spain

Characteristics
- Design: Pedestrian bridge
- Total length: 278 m

History
- Designer: Dominique Perrault
- Opened: 24 March 2011

Location
- Interactive map of Arganzuela Footbridge

The Arganzuela Footbridge (Spanish: puente or pasarela de Arganzuela, formally puente monumental de Arganzuela, also puente de Perrault) is a pedestrian bridge in Madrid, Spain.

== History and description ==
It partially occupies the land released by the burying of the M-30. Designed by Dominique Perrault, it cost about €13.6M.

Building works started in February 2010. The footbridge actually consists of two separate metal cones, one passing over the Madrid Río park while the other crosses over the Manzanares, nearly meeting at an elevated middle point serving as lookout of the Madrid Río park. The combined structure is 278 m long. Perrault employs plate rolling for the curved steel plates along the bridge span.

It was opened on 24 March 2011, although initially only for diurnal usage.

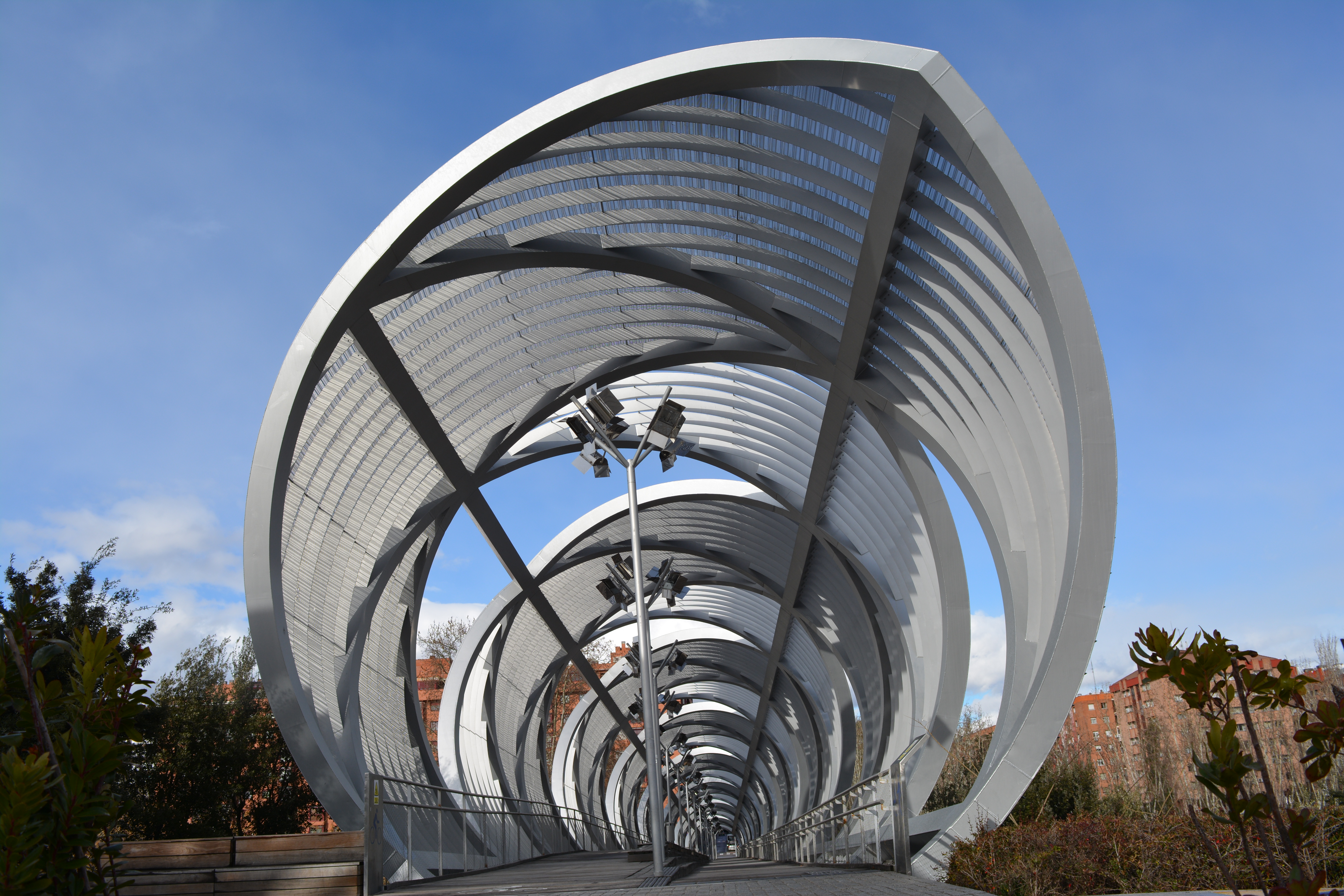
View of the inside

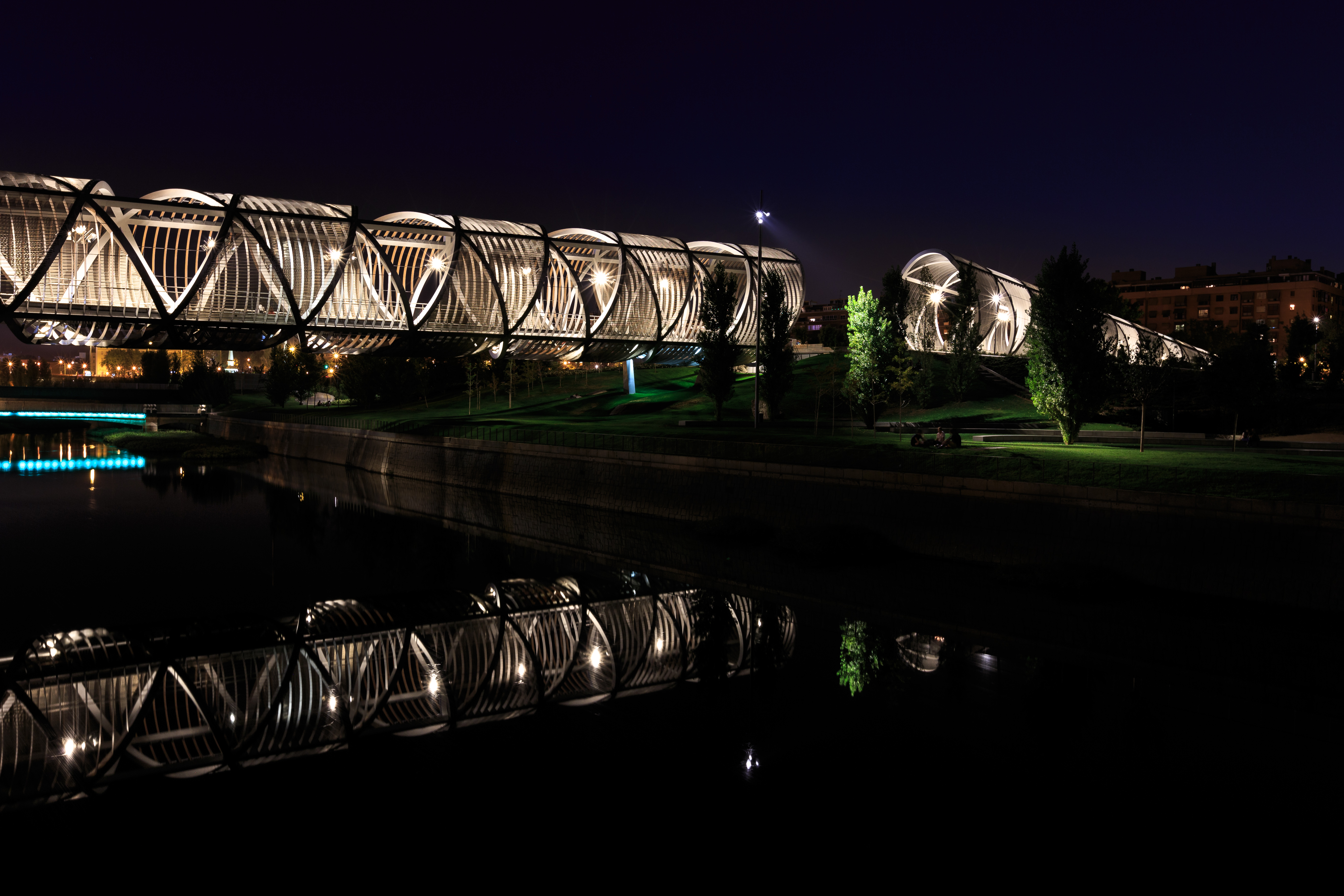
Nighttime view
