= Danube River Commission =

Danube River Commission is an international organisation. It may refer to:

- European Commission of the Danube, 1856
- International Danube Commission, 1921
- Danube Commission, 1948

== See also ==
- Internationalization of the Danube River, to 1856
- Nazi rule over the Danube River, in World War II
- Danube River Conference of 1948
- International Commission for the Protection of the Danube River, 1998
