= New Danube =

Flood control channel in Vienna, Austria

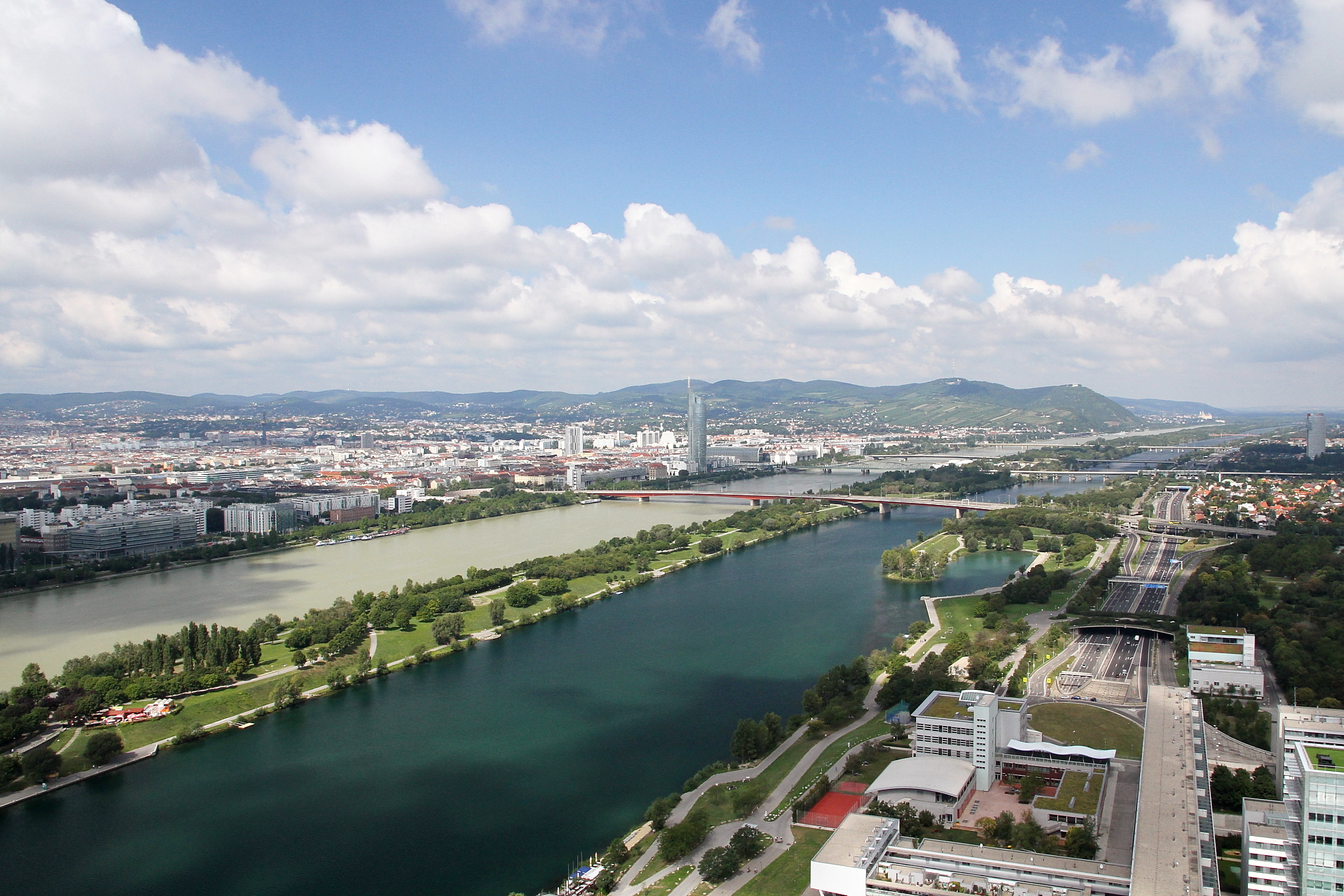
- The New Danube in the front, facing north-west.

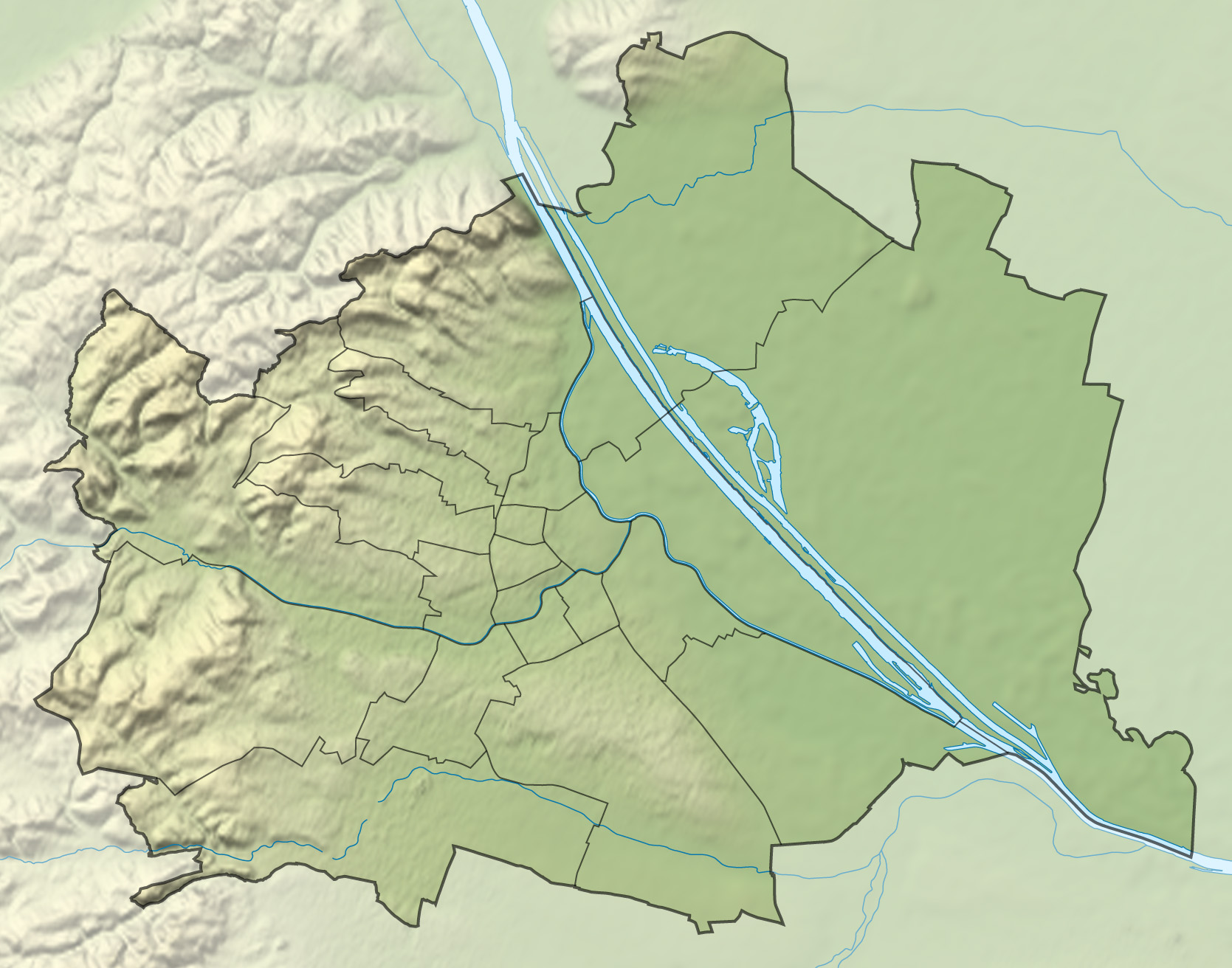
- Location within Vienna
- Location: Vienna
- Coordinates: 48°14′0″N 16°24′20″E
- Max. length: 21.1 km (13.1 mi)
- Max. width: 200 m (660 ft)
- Surface area: 4.2 km^{2} (1.6 sq mi)
- Max. depth: 6.5 m (21 ft)

The New Danube (German: Neue Donau) is a side channel of the Danube in Vienna, Austria, situated parallel to the east of the main river. It was built as part of the flood protection of the city.

== Course ==
The New Danube extends for approximately 21 kilometers, beginning in Langenzersdorf, a town just north of Vienna, after branching off from the main stream. It rejoins the river at the Danube-Auen National Park in the southeast of the city.

The New Danube stretches approximately 21.1 kilometers in length, with an average width of around 200 meters, covering a surface area of between 330 and 420 hectares. The depth ranges from 1.6 to 6.5 metres. It has a maximum flow rate of 5,200 cubic meters per second.

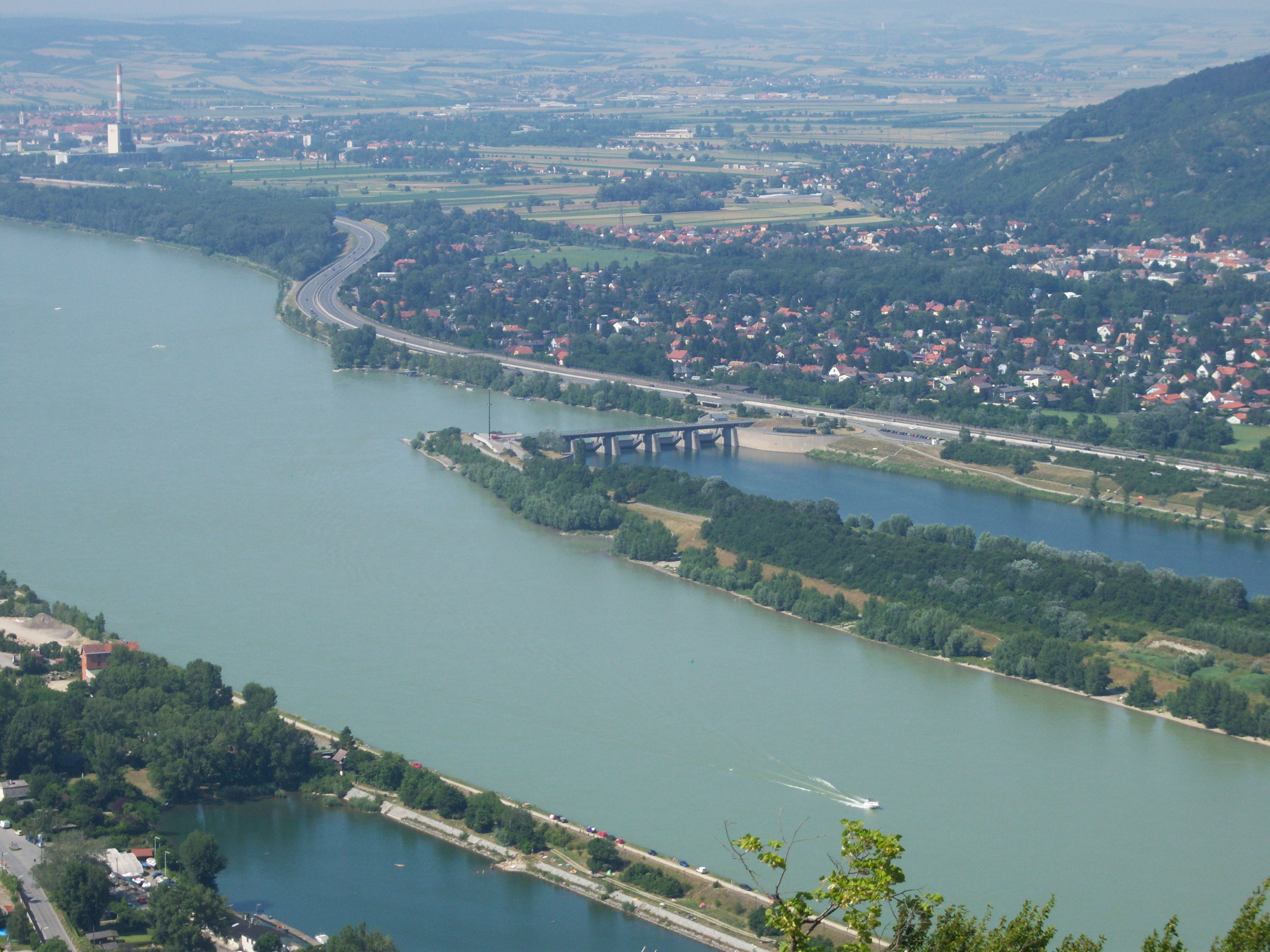
The start of the river.

As the river is cut off from the Danube and only fed through ground water, it is essentially a lake. This gives the water a much higher quality compared to the main river. It is usually much bluer than the comparatively grey Danube.

== History ==
Throughout Vienna's history, the city has suffered multiple devastating floods, such as in 1897, 1899 and 1954. In September 1969, the Vienna City Council decided to improve the flood protection of Vienna. The planned measures included the construction of a 21-kilometer relief channel, separated from the main river by a man-made island, to help prevent overflowing.

The project was approved in July 1970, and construction began in March 1972. The construction process took 16 years, during which approximately 30 million cubic metres of material were excavated, which was used to construct the Donauinsel (Danube Island). The island now also serves as a park and recreation area.

== Flood protection ==
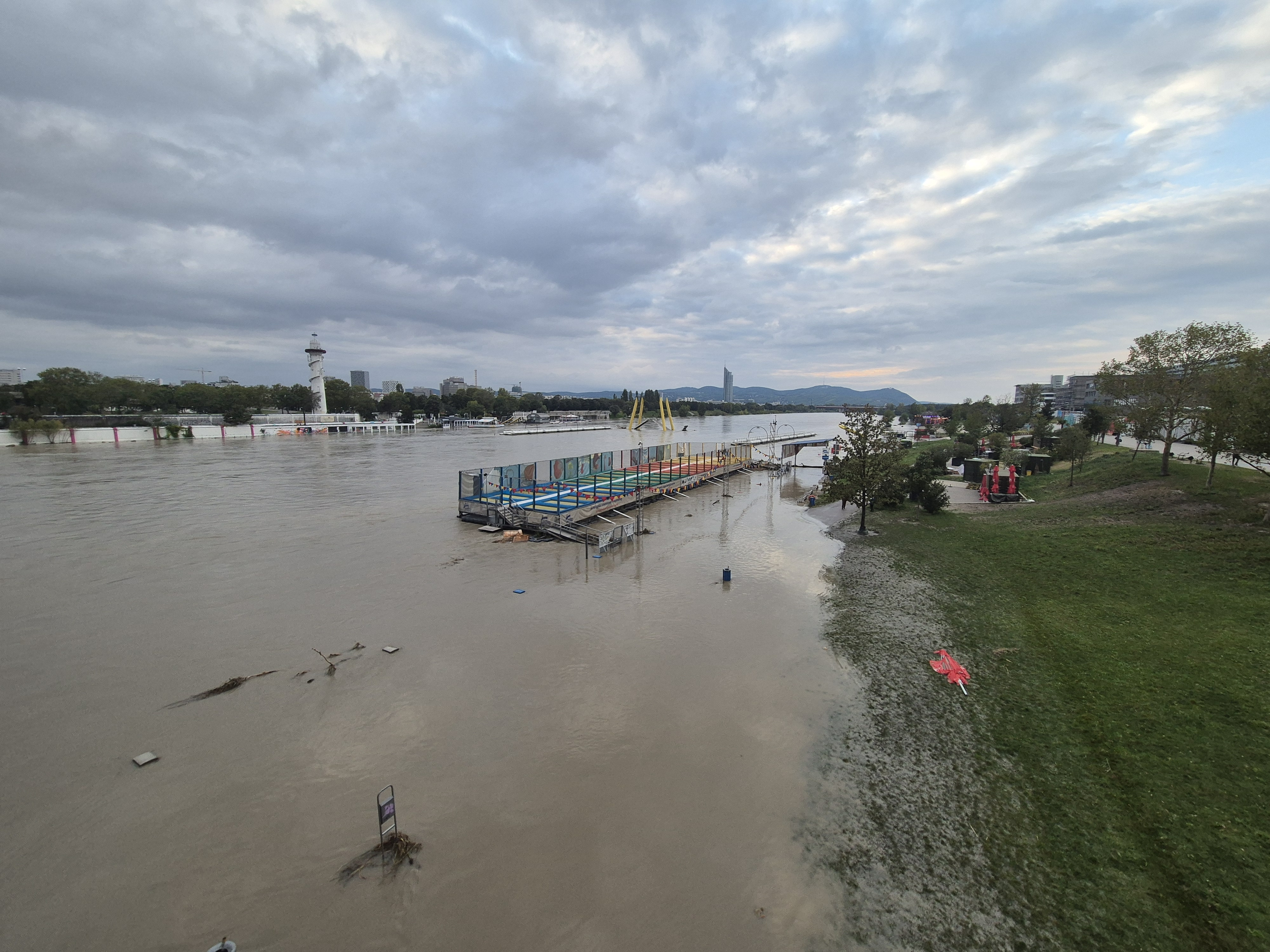
During the 2024 floods.

When the Danube starts overflowing, the two weirs on either end open, allowing water to flow in. This overflow happens when the water level of the Danube reaches 5.2 metres. At this point the flood service staff are deployed and a swimming ban is put in place. To be able to accommodate sufficient water as a narrower overflow channel during high water, the bed of the New Danube is lower than that of the main stream. The project was referred to by the United Nations Human Settlements Programme (UN-HABITAT) as "the first truly multipurpose fully sustainable flood protection scheme."

The system helped protect Vienna during the 2024 Central European floods, with the city coming away relatively unscathed. Austrian hydrologist Günter Blöschl claimed the damage Vienna avoided was far higher than the investment in flood protection.

== Leisure ==
The river can be used for swimming, with many public beaches on both sides of the river, as well as rowing and other aquatic activities. It is also home to the world's largest floating trampoline park.

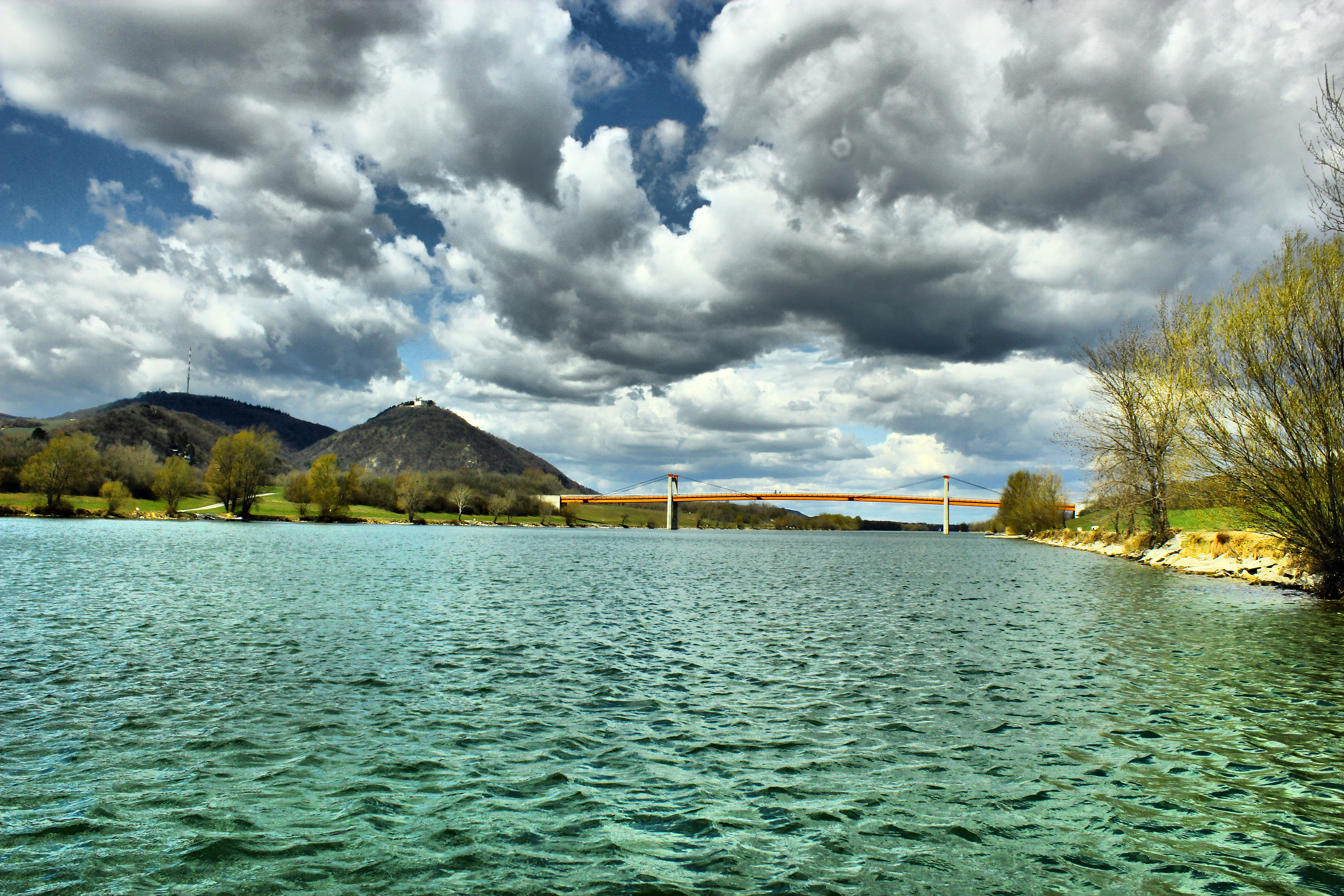
Near Langenzersdorf.

The river can be accessed by the U1, U2 and U6 metro-lines, which stop at the Donauinsel, Donaustadtbrücke, and Neue Donau stations respectively, as well as by S-Bahn, trams and buses.

== See also ==
A series of articles on regulation of the Danube in chronological order:

- Internationalization of the Danube River, for events from earliest times to the Treaty of Paris in 1856
- Commissions of the Danube River, for the international bodies governing the waterway from 1856 to 1940
- Nazi rule over the Danube River
- Danube River Conference of 1948
- Danube Commission, for events since 1948
- International Commission for the Protection of the Danube River, for the organization established in 1998 and charged with environmental and ecological activities
