= King Baabu =

2002 play by Wole Soyinka

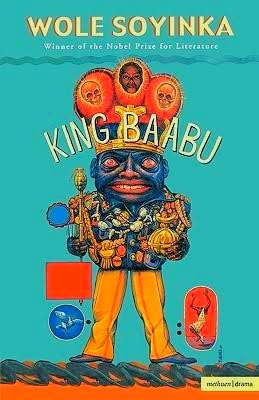
- Author: Wole Soyinka
- Language: English
- Genre: fiction
- Publisher: Methuen Drama
- Publication date: 17 October 2002
- Publication place: Nigeria
- ISBN: 0-413-77175-X

King Baabu is a play by Wole Soyinka amongst his others plays including The Lion and the Jewel,A Dance of the Forests, and The Strong Breed. Wole Soyinka was the first African to win the Nobel Prize award in 1986. King Baabu is a satirical play that mirrors the rule of General Abacha in Nigeria through absurdity and humour. It follows the transformation of General Basha Bash into King Baabu, portraying his reign with a cast of characters speaking in a childish language. Through comedy and storytelling, the play critiques power, corruption, and the cult of personality, leaving a lasting impression as a poignant commentary on political absurdity.

== Plot ==
King Baabu takes center stage on serving as a mirror reflecting the dictatorial rule of General Basha Bash, a thinly veiled portrayal of Nigeria's General Abacha. The play starts with General Basha Bash, who, following a military coup, sheds his military garb for regal robes and crowns himself King Baabu. With his newfound power, Baabu plunges the nation into a surreal world of tyranny.

As King Baabu's regime runs out of control, the people, once oppressed by General Basha Bash, now find themselves subjected to the whims of a ruler even more absurd and outrageous. Yet, despite the absurdity, they had no choice than to comply

Through "King Baabu," Soyinka blends satire, comedy, and social commentary, offering an indictment of dictatorship and the abuse of power. As the curtain falls, the audience is left to ponder the timeless lesson in the theater of politics, absurdity often reigns supreme.

== Characters ==
- King Baabu (formerly General Basha Bash): The central character of the play, a cruel ruler who seizes power in a coup and transforms himself into a flamboyant king.
- Potipoo: The court jester, whose antics provide comic relief throughout the play.
- General Uzi: A loyal lackey of King Baabu, known for his blind allegiance and unquestioning obedience.

== Setting ==
King Baabu is set in a fictional version of Nigeria during the rule of General Abacha, although it's more of a satirical commentary than a strict representation of historical events. The story revolves around General Basha Bash, who stages a coup and declares himself King Baabu, symbolizing the arbitrary and dictatorial nature of his rule.

The setting reflects the political turmoil and authoritarianism displayed during General Abacha's regime, with parallels drawn between the events in the novel and real-life political dynamics. The use of a childish language for the characters, reminiscent of Alfred Jarry's "Ubu Roi," adds to the satirical tone of the narrative, highlighting the absurdity of the situation.

== Themes ==
- Authoritarianism and Dictatorship: The novel explores the consequences of unchecked power and the abuse of authority by depicting General Basha Bash's transformation into King Baabu. It delves into the absurdity and oppression of dictatorial regimes.
- Political Satire: Using satire, the novel critiques the political landscape of Nigeria under General Abacha's rule, as well as broader themes of corruption and nepotism in governance. It employs humour and exaggeration to highlight societal issues and political absurdities.
- Language and Communication: The use of a childish language for the characters underscores themes of manipulation and propaganda. It reflects how language can be distorted and controlled by those in power to maintain their authority and suppress dissent.
- Resistance and Rebellion: Amidst the satire, the novel also touches on themes of resistance and rebellion against oppressive regimes. It portrays characters who challenge the status quo and fight for freedom and justice, despite the absurdity of their circumstances.
