= Regime theory =

Theory regarding international relations

Regime theory is a theory within international relations derived from the liberal tradition which argues that international institutions or regimes affect the behavior of states or other international actors. It assumes that cooperation is possible in the anarchic system of states, as regimes are, by definition, instances of international cooperation.

Stephen D. Krasner was a key figure in establishing the theory as a prominent topic of study in IR, in part through the 1983 edited collection International Regimes. Robert Keohane's 1984 book After Hegemony has been described as regime theory's "fullest expression."

== Theoretical foundations ==
While realism predicts that conflict should be the norm in international relations, regime theorists say that there is cooperation despite anarchy. Often they cite cooperation in trade, human rights, and collective security, among other issues. These instances of cooperation are regimes. The most commonly cited definition comes from Stephen Krasner, who defines regimes as "institutions possessing norms, decision rules, and procedures which facilitate a convergence of expectations". Thus, the concept of regimes is broader than that of a formal organization.

Not all approaches to regime theory, however are liberal or neoliberal; some realist scholars like Joseph Grieco developed hybrid theories which take a realism-based approach to this fundamentally liberal theory. (Realists do not say cooperation never happens, just that it's not the norm—a difference of degree).

== In international political economy ==
As stated above, a regime is defined by Stephen D. Krasner as a set of explicit or implicit "principles, norms, rules, and decision making procedures around which actor expectations converge in a given area of international relations". This definition is intentionally broad, and covers human interaction ranging from formal organizations (e.g., OPEC) to informal groups (e.g., major banks during the debt crisis). Note that a regime need not be composed of states.

Within IPE there are three main approaches to regime theory: the dominant, liberal-derived interest-based approach, the realist critique of interest-based approaches, and finally knowledge-based approaches that come from the cognitivist school of thought. The first two are rationalist approaches while the third is sociological.

Within regime theory, because regime theory is by definition a theory that explains international cooperation (i.e., it's a traditionally liberal concept) liberal approaches prevail within the literature.

=== Liberal approaches ===
Liberal interest-based approaches to regime theory argue that cooperation in anarchy is possible without a hegemon because there exists a "convergence of expectations". Regimes facilitate cooperation by establishing standards of behavior that signal to other members that they are in fact cooperating. When all states expect cooperation from the others, the probability of sustaining cooperation increases. Digvijay Mehra notes that regime theory lacks recognition of political parties and their role in altering the influence of international institutions, but Mehra's claims have generally been ignored in academic circles for their lack of evidentiary support and intellectual rigor.

Neoliberals believe that realists neglect the degree to which countries share interests and the iterative nature of state relations. Realists err by implicitly modeling the world using the classic single-play prisoner's dilemma, in which the payoff structure makes defection a dominant strategy for both players. The difference between this model and reality is that states are not like prisoners, states must continually cooperate whereas prisoners will never see one another again. One's decisions today, then, have future consequences. Mutual cooperation is thus rational: the sum of relatively small cooperative payoffs over time can be greater than the gain from a single attempt to exploit your opponent followed by an endless series of mutual defections In The Evolution of Cooperation, Robert Axelrod referred to single-shot exploitation as the behavior whereby states avoided "tit for tat".

In the iterated prisoner's dilemma, the actors' behavior is determined by the following assumptions:

- States are rational, unitary, gain-maximizing actors, living in anarchy and ridden by the security dilemma.
- There are future consequences for present actions; the prisoner's dilemma is not a one-shot event. Thus;
- It is in the interest of states to cooperate in the present because, in the future, other states will defect on them (tit-for-tat strategy). Thus;
- The theory presupposes that states are concerned with absolute gains, that is, states do not consider the gains or losses of other states in their utility analysis. In contrast neorealists argue that states are concerned with relative gains. That is, states are concerned with the advantages they gain versus the advantages of other states in the anarchic system.

Neoliberal IR theorist Robert Keohane argues that international regimes can increase the likelihood of cooperation by:

- Providing information about the behavior of others by monitoring the behavior of members and reporting on compliance.
  - Regimes clearly define what constitutes a defection and often clearly prescribe punishments for defection.
  - This reduces the fear that the state is being exploited by other members of the regime and minimizes the chance for misunderstanding. Prescribing sanctions reduces the incentive to covertly defect.
- Reducing transaction costs.
  - By institutionalizing cooperation, regimes can reduce the cost of future agreements. By reducing the cost of reaching an agreement, regimes increase the likelihood of future cooperation. For example, each round of GATT resolved many procedural problems that did not have to be revisited in subsequent rounds, making cooperation easier and more likely.
- Generating the expectation of cooperation among members.
  - By creating iteration and the belief that interaction will continue for the foreseeable future, regimes increase the importance of reputation and allow for the employment of complex strategies.

Other authors such as Kenneth A. Oye claim that regimes can provide incentives to cooperate and deterrents to defect by altering the payoff structure of the regime.

=== Realist approaches ===
Realists such as Joseph Grieco propose power-based theories of regimes based on hegemonic stability theory. Regime theory may appear to counter hegemonic stability theory sometimes, but realists also apply it within regime theory in order to explain change. When used in this way, realists conclude that a strong hegemon is what makes for a successful—i.e., robust, resilient—regime.

In brief, within regime theory, liberals and realists disagree on two things—the nature of international cooperation and the role of international institutions. Liberals believe that international institutions at most bring about an environment conducive to the convergence of state interests, which facilitates regime cooperation; and at least, facilitate cooperation that might otherwise not have been able to occur in an anarchic world. On the other hand, realists believe that regimes merely reflect the distribution of power in the international system, and that any cooperation that occurs under a regime would have occurred anyway. (Powerful states create regimes to serve their security and economic interests; regimes have no independent power over states, especially great powers; as such, regimes are simply intervening variables between power, the real independent variable, and cooperation, the dependent variable).

Susan Strange had a five-fold critique of regime theory:

1. It is a fad: regime theory is a temporary reaction to current events and it has cumulative value to knowledge
2. The concept of regime is imprecise
3. It is value-laden: it is pre-occupied with preserving U.S. hegemony and U.S.-led institutions, which are seen as benevolent
4. It underemphasizes the dynamism of world politics: regime theory has a static view of politics
5. it is state-centric: regime theory does not consider broader structural patterns and forms of power

=== Cognitivist knowledge-based approaches ===
In contrast to the rationalist approaches above, cognitivists critique the rationalist theories on the grounds that liberals and realists both use flawed assumptions such as that nation-states are always and forever rational actors; that interests remain static, that different interpretations of interests and power are not possible. The cognitivists also argue that even when the rationalist theories employ iterated game theories where future consequences affect present decisions, they ignore a major implication of such iteration—learning. Consequences from an iterated game look backwards to the past as well as forward to the future. So one's decisions today are not the same as one's decisions tomorrow, not only because the actors are taking the future into account but because each is taking the past into account as well. Finally cognitivists use a post-positivist methodology which does not believe that social institutions or actors can be separated out of their surrounding socio-political context for analytical purposes. The cognitivist approach then, is sociological or post-positivist instead of rationalist. In sum, for the cognitivists, it's not only interests or power that matters but perceptions and environment as well.

An example of a useful application of this approach to the study of international regime theory, is exemplified in a doctoral dissertation by Edythe Weeks, wherein she demonstrates that we can apply this type of analysis to explain and highlight key actors, unfolding political dynamics and historical-ideological shifts, related to commercial activities concerning outer space and its resources.

=== Alternative approaches ===
Alternative approaches to liberal or realist regime theory tend to treat the debates over the normative bases of cooperation or otherwise as epiphenomenal. They emphasize instead the complex intersection of social forces, including changing values, that gave rise to ongoing political and economic regimes of power in the first place. For example, they emphasize the rise of modern bureaucratic regimes of negotiation or the normalizing of the global system of nation-states and multinational corporations as key players on the global stage:

In order to understand the nature of globalizing institutions and regimes it is crucial to locate them in their social-relational context, rather than just concentrating on the organizational mechanics and policy-making content of a few peak institutions. Understanding the process, historical context, and contemporary relations of institutionalization is fundamental for making sense of the more empirical task of documenting the activities of this or that institution.

== See also ==
- Hegemonic stability theory
- International legal theory
- International regime
- International relations
- International relations theory
- Neoliberalism (international relations)
- Neorealism (international relations)
