= Axis control of the Danube =

Period of international river management

Nazi rule over the Danube
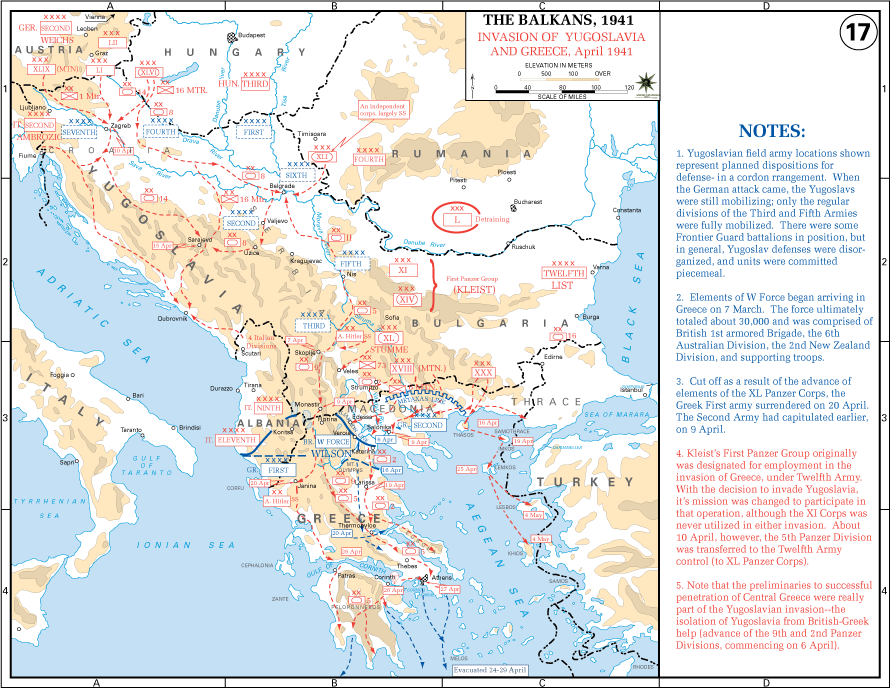
- Country: Nazi Germany; Independent State of Croatia; Kingdom of Hungary; Kingdom of Romania

Axis control of the Danube was brought about by force of arms, through annexation of Austria, invasion of Yugoslavia and of the Soviet Union and treaties with the Kingdom of Romania and Hungary, but a legal cover was provided through moves that resulted in a new international order on the river beginning in 1940 and ending in 1945.

Before World War II, international trade and commerce at the mouths of the Danube, as well as many of the physical works needed to keep vessels from running aground, were regulated by an international agency called the European Commission of the Danube, founded in 1856. By the time the German invasions began in 1938 the commission was composed of the riparian (river-bordering) states, plus France, the United Kingdom and Italy, the chief commercial nations of Europe at that time. Upstream of Brăila, the river was under the control of the International Danube Commission, a body composed only of the riparian states.

From 1938 through 1940 the regimes of both commissions were broken, and Nazi Germany assumed control of the Danube through a series of moves which were ignored by the victorious Allies after the war.

== Before the war ==
Romania had desired the outright abolition of the Danube River Commission since 1881, when King Carol I said he would insist on the mouths of the Danube, which ran through Romanian territory, being "exclusively controlled by Romanian officials." The country renewed its demands in 1919 at the Paris Peace Conference and in 1921 at a conference at which the Danube River Commission was renewed and strengthened as an independent agency.

By 1935, a new power had appeared through the length of the Danube: Nazi Germany, whose new self-propelled barges swiftly moved up and down the river outside Germany's borders, "the pioneers of the new order. They flew the Swastika and were built of bullet-proof steel."

The demise of the old European Commission of the Danube as a semi-independent agency in the affairs of Europe took place with startling suddenness in August 1938. The spring session of the commission opened in May, with Italy absent, and the principal business was to be a routine report by engineering experts recommending a new 2.5-mile canal to cost about $4.5 million. The decision to turn over almost all administration in the delta to Romania was announced on August 20, 1938, and the transfer of authority actually did take place early in September.

The commission was left with supervision of the customs duties, but all its decisions were subject to a veto by Romania. The government took over all works and buildings, the Seaman's Hospital, and the first floor of the administration building. The commission remained in existence; loans advanced to it had not been repaid.

On March 1, 1939, Italy and Germany acceded to the new treaty. The commission then met on March 11, 1939, with Britain and France absent.

== During the war ==
=== Diplomacy ===
World War II in Europe began on September 1, 1939, with Germany's invasion of Poland, and two days later Britain and France declared war on Germany, so it was a surprise when representatives of the two western powers showed up at a special commission session in neutral Romania in February 1940; the British and French representatives were greeted with "hearty handshakes" by the German delegate, whose turn it was to preside. "Although the conference was behind closed doors," the "New York Times" reported, "it was believed that the principal subject of discussion was liquidation of the commission."

In August 1940, the Reich unilaterally announced the dissolution of the European Commission, noting that Germany and Italy had withdrawn and Britain and France were nonfunctioning members. "German quarters noted with satisfaction that this ends the existence of a valuable source of information for the Allies on the economic situation in Danubian territory," reported the "New York Times."

Meanwhile, the upstream International Danube Commission was undergoing similar German-imposed changes. The German Reich had pulled out of the commission in November 1936, with an announcement that it was assuming "full sovereignty" over all German watercourses. After the Anschluss in 1938, Austria's membership also came to a close. Early in 1940, German sources were quoted in the "Times" that Germany was attempting "through innuendo and informal suggestions" to take over control of the river, and late that year a conference was held in Vienna (then part of the German Reich) to dissolve the upriver commission. A new group, "The Consultative Commission for Danubian Affairs Above Brăila" was instituted, chaired by Germany, the only nation that had the power to call meetings. Other members were Italy, Hungary, Bulgaria, Slovakia, and Yugoslavia, which nation was later excluded when relations with Germany became strained.

The Soviet Union protested the abolition of the downriver European Commission, noting that it possessed territory on the Danube, having annexed Bessarabia again early in 1940 and must be consulted on any move. Germany then resurrected the European Commission and allowed the USSR to become a member, allotting to it "Britain's former authority". This commission began its meeting in October 1940, with the Soviets bringing a plan that would make a reality of "its dream of a port for ocean-going vessels" on the Danube's Chilia branch. The meetings, however, degenerated into political squabbling, with the Soviets walking out midway through the series. The commission ended in December, and "diplomatic sources" told the "Times" that:

the Italian and Russian delegates had engaged in fist fights when the conference broke up. The Russians objected to Italian participation, contending that the Fascists had no interest in the Danube, but Premier Mussolini's representatives announced that the Rome government had purchased two small tugboats to fly Italian flags on the Danube.

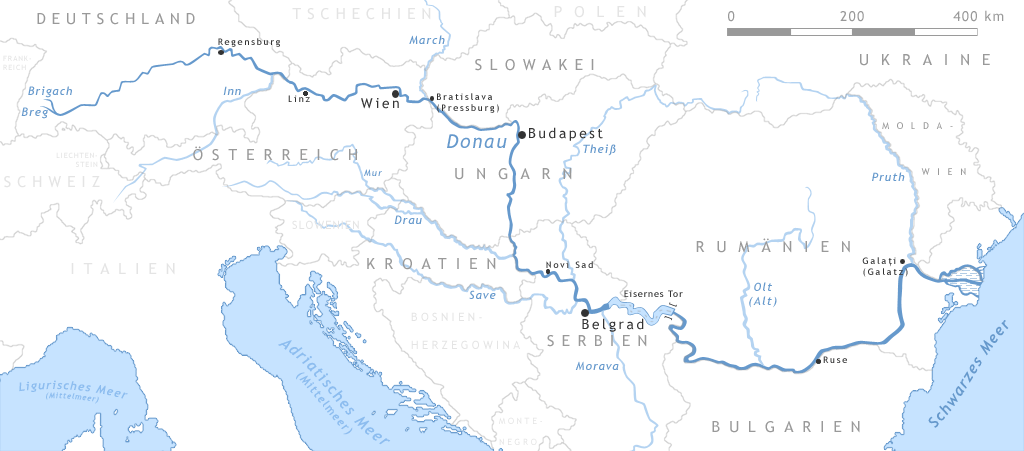
Modern map of the Danube. The Chilia branch is the top line in the Delta (right), and the Sulina channel is the middle one.

London quickly protested to Moscow about Soviet participation in the conference, but the Soviet foreign ministry replied that Britain was no longer relevant to the Danube as far as it was concerned. The note said:

The formation of the Danube Commission with the participation of the U.S.S.R. and also of States situated on the Danube or near the Danube constitutes a restoration of justice violated by the Versailles and other treaties, on the strength of which the British Government, having played a leading part in this matter, the U.S.S.R. was kept out of the international as well as the European Danube Commission.

The Danube Commission must naturally be composed of representatives of States situated on or closely connected with the Danube and using the Danube as a trade channel (for instance, Italy).

It is clear that Great Britain, being removed thousands of kilometers from the Danube, cannot be classed as such a State.

Romania signed the Tripartite Pact of the Axis powers on November 23, 1940. Bulgaria signed on January 3, 1941, and German troops entered the country the next month.

=== German aims ===
Nazi Germany's main concerns in establishing control over the Danubian basin were mostly economic in nature. Adolf Hitler's primary objective throughout the war was to conquer sufficient "living space" ("Lebensraum") at the expense of the Soviet Union and other countries in Eastern Europe for German settlement, which would in turn allow control over the country's rich deposits of natural resources (such as oil, grain, and iron), transforming Germany into an economic autarky. The Danube was considered to be the main route along which this stream of raw materials was to be transported to Germany proper. Hitler referred to the Danube as the "river of the future". At other times he was more explicit about its role in the German-dominated Europe:

The Danube is the waterway which leads into the very heart of the continent, and for this reason, in a Europe united by us, will have to be regarded as a German river and controlled by Germany.

— Adolf Hitler, 29 June 1942.

In view of these intentions, various proposals to establish permanent German possession of the entire Danubian waterway were formulated by the Nazis. One of these proposed the settlement of all the ethnic Germans in Southeastern Europe along a broad strip of territory on both sides of the river, stretching from Mohács in southern Hungary all the way to the Black Sea. Another suggested turning Belgrade into a fortress-city of the Reich ("Reichsfestung") and the center of a "Reichsgau" (administrative subdivision), to be named Prinz-Eugen. Neither of these ideas was officially endorsed by the wartime German government, however, and the historical record indicates that the Nazis had no clear conception as to what extent Germany should control the Danube or how this control was to be effected. Hitler's own preference, at least for the immediate future, was the retention of a number of satellite states (Hungary, Romania, Bulgaria, and others) closely tied to the Nazi regime politically and economically. Serbia at the very least was most likely to remain under some permanent form of German administration.

== See also ==
A series of articles on this subject in chronological order

- Internationalization of the Danube River, for events from earliest times to the Treaty of Paris in 1856
- Commissions of the Danube River, for the international bodies governing the waterway from 1856 to 1940
- Danube River Conference of 1948
- Danube Commission, for events since 1948
- International Commission for the Protection of the Danube River, for the organization established in 1998 and charged with environmental and ecological activities
