= Donauinsel =

Austrian man made island

Coordinates: 48°14′N 16°24′E

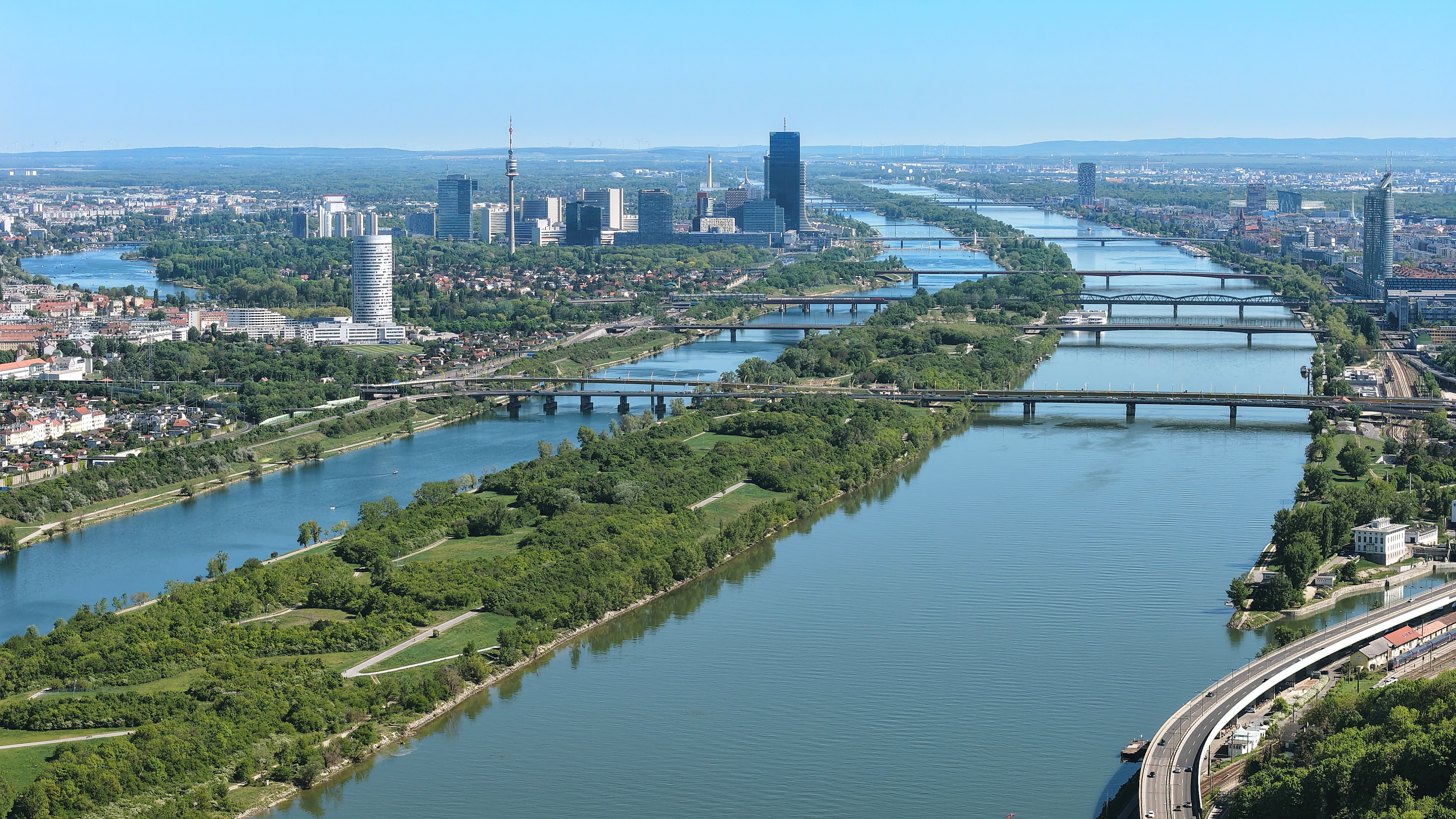
The Donauinsel, separating the New Danube (left) from Danube (right). The UNO-City is visible on the left side of the photo.

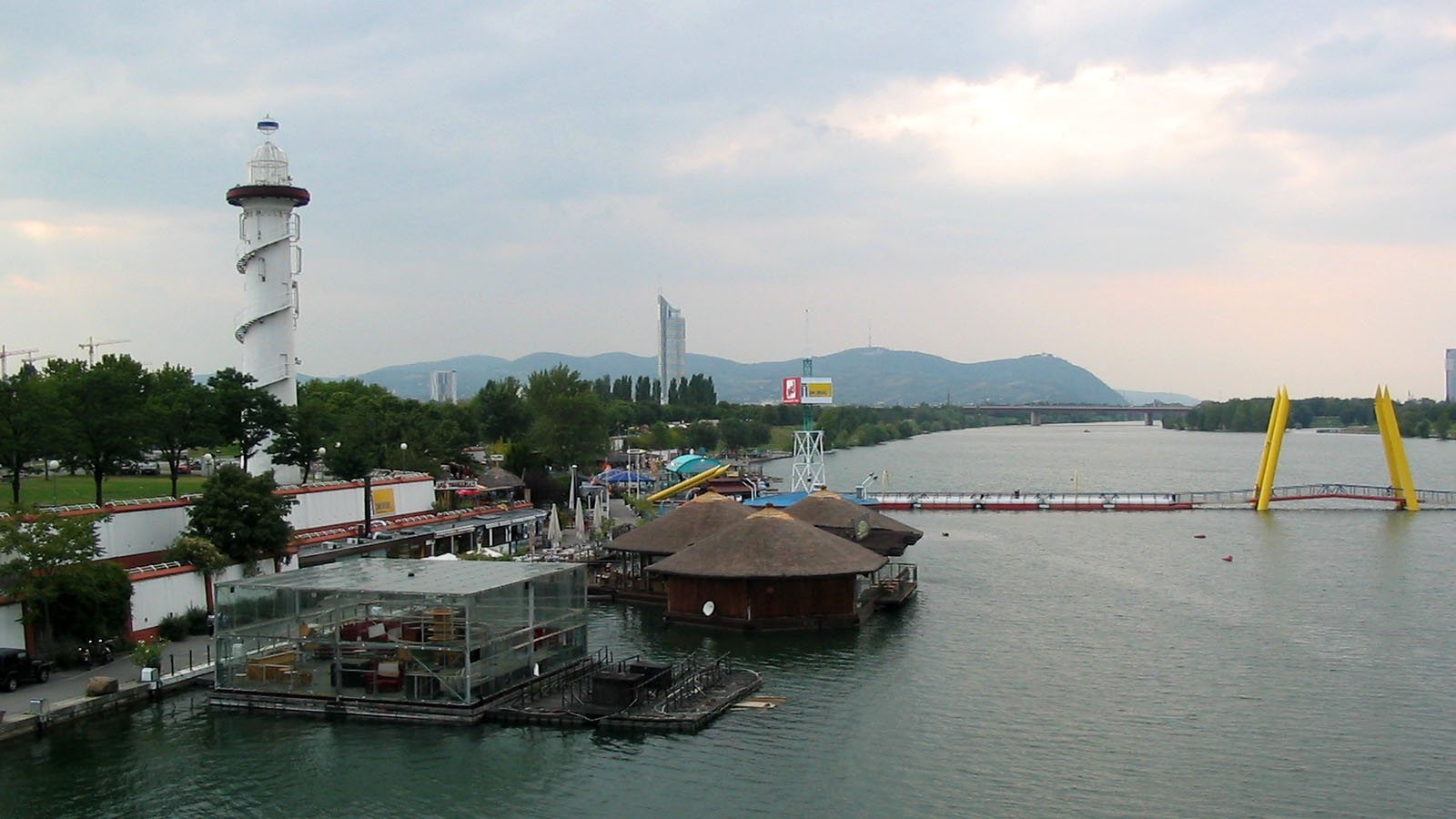
Copa Cagrana with the lighthouse and a pontoon bridge.

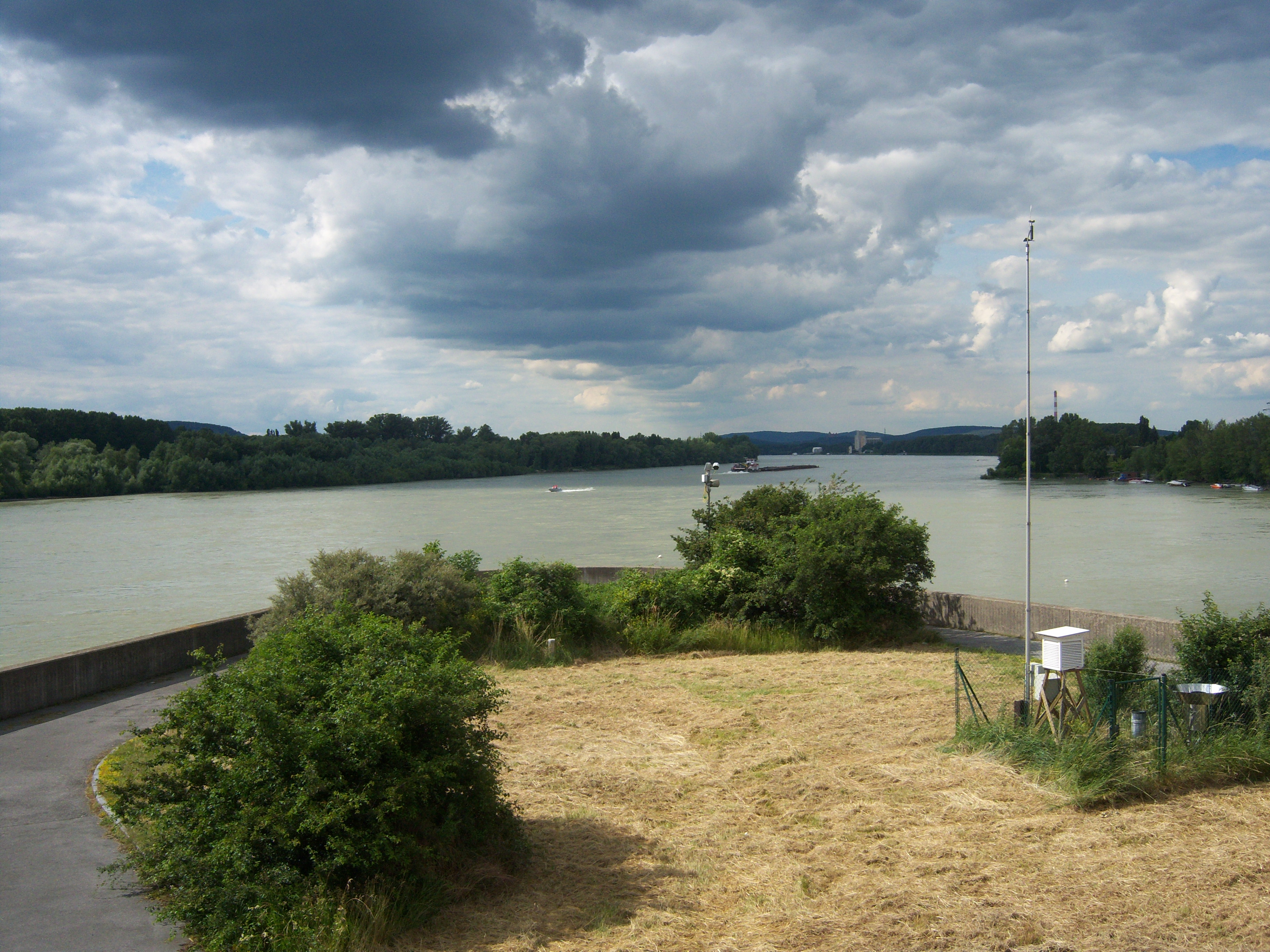
The northern tip of the island.

The Donauinsel (Danube Island) is a long, narrow artificial island in central Vienna, Austria, lying between the Danube and the New Danube. The island is 21.1 km (13 1/8 mi) in length, but is only 70–210 m (230–690 ft) wide. It was constructed from 1972 to 1988 primarily as a measure for flood protection.

It has since become the most popular recreational area in the city.

== Recreation ==
The Donauinsel is a popular recreational area for the Viennese population. In addition to beaches and sunbathing areas by the New Danube, there are also multiple barbecue areas, as well as various other free facilities, including a water playground, volleyball and other sports fields, skateparks and dog parks. Commercial facilities, such as restaurants, boat hire, a water slide and a wakeboard lift, are also available. In the north and south of the island, there are two large naturist bathing areas

The Donauinselfest is an annual open-air music festival held on the Donauinsel. Organized by the Social Democratic Party (SPÖ), the festival has taken place every June since 1984. Initially conceived as a small community event, it has grown into a large-scale three-day festival, attracting around three million visitors over the course of a weekend, making it the largest music festival in the world by attendance. Artists who have performed here include The Beach Boys, Dua Lipa, and Falco.

A new gastronomy location on the northern shore of the New Danube was completed in July 2015. It offers approximately 300 seats, is flood-proof, and suitable for year-round operation. The area has since been named Copa Beach by the city administration, while the establishments on the opposite side of the island are called Sunken City.

== Ecology ==
To enhance the greening of the island, approximately 1.8 million trees and shrubs, covering around 170 hectares of forest, were planted. Ecological niches were preserved or created to support biodiversity. While the northern and southern parts of the island are designed to maintain a more natural environment, the middle third has been developed in a park-like manner with landscaped features. The island also serves as a nature reserve, providing a habitat for rare bird, amphibian and fish species, as well as deer, hares and beavers.

== Reliable flood protection ==
The main purpose of the island however is to be part of Vienna's highly sophisticated flood protection system. As the river Danube crosses the city (before major extensions: passed nearby), this has been a constant concern over hundreds of years. The first notable protective measures were taken between 1870 and 1875. A central bed, 280 m, was dug out, and an inundation area of 450 m was created at the river's left bank.

In 1970, a new plan was conceived and soon executed: digging an additional channel to replace the former inundation area, and using the spoil to build up the remaining strip of land between the straightened bed from the 19th century flood defense schemes and the newly created one. The new channel is called the Neue Donau (New Danube). After the completion of the works it was envisaged that the resulting island should eventually be used for recreation. The flood control system is designed to protect from flash floods bringing river flows of up to 14,000 m^{3} per second. This has only happened once in Vienna's history; in 1501. The heavy 2002 flood brought flows of 10,000 m^{3} per second. It includes the Danube Canal's Nußdorf weir, locks at either end of New Danube, a groundwater level control system integrated into the right bank flood levee (which creates appropriate conditions for the large park area Prater, once part of a wide alluvial forest zone), and the new Freudenau river plant's sluice.

The works were started in March 1972 and completed in 1988. The power plant was added from 1992 to 1998.
