= Regime =

Form of government

A political regime world map, 2024

World citizens living under different political regimes, as defined by Polity IV

In political science, a regime (also spelled régime) is a system of norms, rules, and decision-making procedures. In the context of national politics, it typically refers to the system of political organization that determines access to public office, and the extent of power held by officials. Political scientists often categorize regimes as being democratic, autocratic, or hybrid. International regimes are sets of implicit or explicit principles, norms, rules, and decision-making procedures that international actors’ expectations converge around in a given area of international relations.

In everyday language, a regime is an authoritarian or unjust government.

== Usage ==
While the term originally referred to any type of government, in modern usage it often has a negative connotation, implying authoritarianism or dictatorship. The Merriam-Webster Dictionary defines a regime simply as a form of government, while the Oxford English Dictionary defines it as "a government, especially an authoritarian one". According to Yale professor Juan José Linz, there are three main types of political regimes: democracies, totalitarian regimes, and authoritarian regimes, with hybrid regimes sitting between these categories. The term regime is often used critically to portray a leader as corrupt or undemocratic.

Contemporary academic usage of the term "regime" is broader than popular and journalistic usage, meaning "an intermediate stratum between the government (which makes day-to-day decisions and is easy to alter) and the state (which is a complex bureaucracy tasked with a range of coercive functions)." In global studies and international relations, the concept of regime is also used to name international regulatory agencies (for example, international regime), which lie outside of the control of national governments. Some authors thus distinguish analytically between institutions and regimes while recognizing that they are bound up with each other:

Institutions as we describe them are publicly enacted, relatively-enduring bodies of practice, procedures and norms, ranging from formalized legal entities such as the WTO to more informal but legally-buttressed and abiding sets of practices and regimes such as the liberal capitalist market. The key phrases here are 'publicly enacted' and 'relatively enduring'. The phrase 'publicly enacted' in this sense implies active projection, legal sanction, and often as not, some kind of opposition.

It is common to tie an individual or ideology to a government regime, for example Russia under Vladimir Putin, China's Communist regime, or Donald Trump's second presidency in the United States. Regimes can thus be defined as sets of protocols and norms embedded either in institutions or institutionalized practices – formal such as states or informal such as the "liberal trade regime" – that are publicly enacted and relatively enduring.

== Types of political regimes ==
=== Authoritarian regimes ===
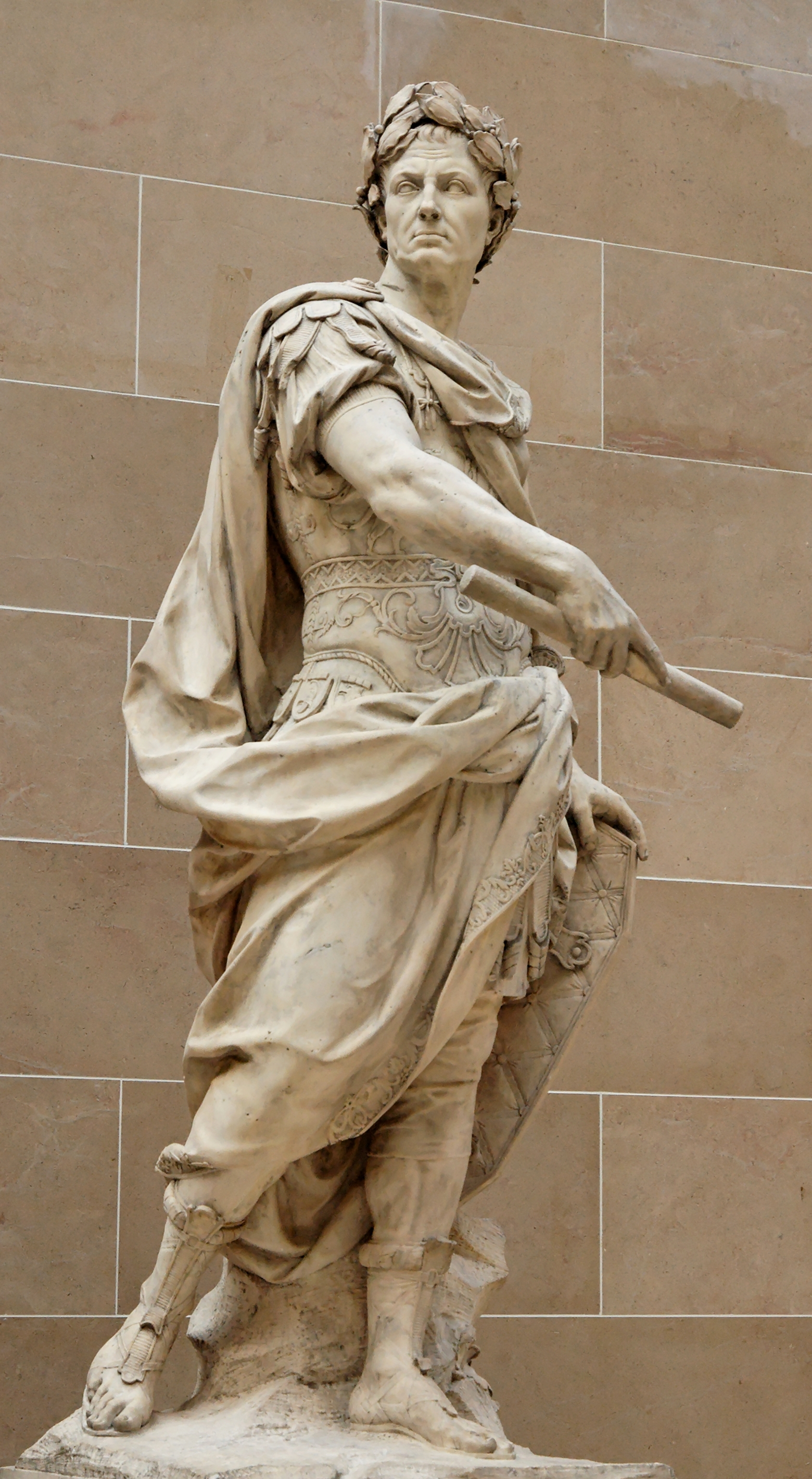
A statue of Julius Caesar

Authoritarian regimes are systems in which power is highly centralized, and often concentrated in the hands of a single leader or a small elite group. In these regimes, political opposition is often suppressed, with dissenting voices silenced through tactics such as censorship, imprisonment, or violence. Political freedoms, including freedom of speech and the press, are usually restricted or controlled by the government. Although some authoritarian regimes may hold elections, those elections are frequently neither free nor fair, and the results are typically manipulated to keep the regime in power. Political scientist Juan Linz states that an authoritarian government lacks both political pluralism and political mobilization. He states that an authoritarian regime specifically has vague limits on executive power in order to give more control to the executive branch.

For instance, Russia, since the Russian Revolution in 1918, holds elections where opposition is heavily restricted and media outlets are controlled. Similarly, since the Communist Party took control of China in 1949, the country has operated under an authoritarian regime where the party exercises strict control over the political system, curtails civil liberties, and restricts freedom of expression. Another notable example is the Roman Empire under Julius Caesar, which had a highly centralized government that transformed the Roman Republic into the Roman Empire.

=== Totalitarian regimes ===
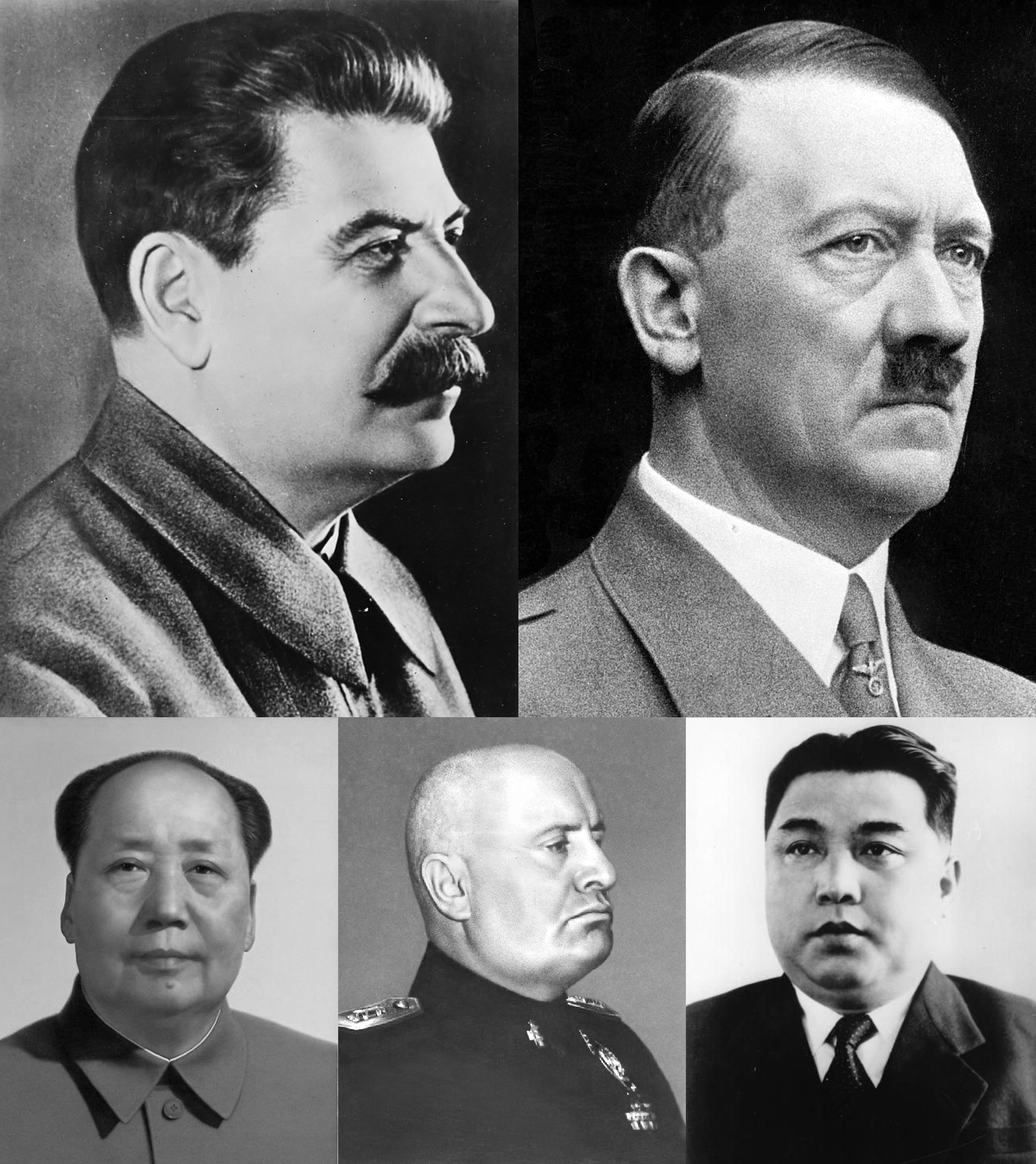
Images of totalitarian leaders

Totalitarian regimes represent the most extreme form of authoritarianism, where the government seeks total control over all aspects of public and private life. In these regimes, the state exercises control over nearly every aspect of society, including the economy, media, education, culture, and even the personal beliefs and values of individuals. Governments in totalitarian states often suppress opposition by monitoring citizens via mass surveillance systems and networks of informants. A common element is state-sponsored terror, which includes tactics like imprisonment, torture, and forced disappearances to instill fear, suppress dissent, and maintain control..

A totalitarian regime typically upholds a singular political ideology that is promoted through propaganda and state-controlled media, ensuring that all citizens conform to the state's views. North Korea is a prominent example of a totalitarian regime, with the Kim family's leadership exercising near-complete control over every aspect of life in the country. Similarly, Nazi Germany under Adolf Hitler was a totalitarian regime that sought to control not only the state but also the cultural and social lives of its people, using terror and propaganda to maintain power.

=== Democratic regimes ===
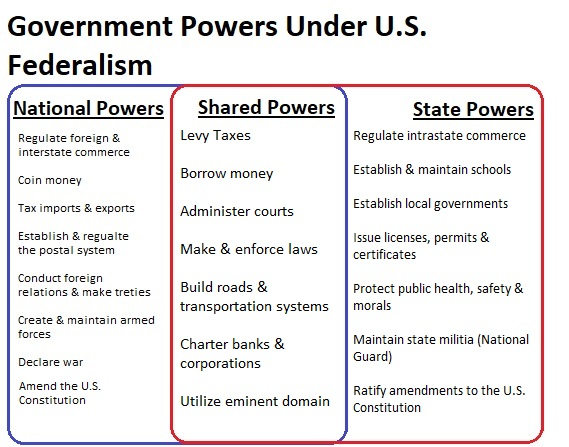
US Federalism Diagram

Democratic regimes are characterized by the rule of law, where laws ostensibly apply equally to all citizens, including government officials. In a democracy, citizens have the right to participate in free and fair elections, where they can vote for representatives and leaders in a competitive process, and so these reresentatives and leaders are authorized to rule the political entity. These regimes typically maintain a political system that ensures multiple political parties can compete for power, reflecting the political pluralism within the society. Democracies prioritize the protection of civil liberties, such as freedom of speech, assembly, and religion, which are fundamental rights guaranteed by the state.

A key feature of democratic regimes is the separation of powers between the executive, legislative, and judicial branches of government, ensuring that no one branch holds too much power and that each can act as a check on the others. Examples of democratic regimes include the United States, where power is divided into federal and state systems, and Germany, which features a parliamentary democracy with a strong focus on human rights. The term democracy can have positive connotations, but according to political scientist Samuel Huntington, democracy is a system of government with free and fair elections to hold leaders accountable. A contemporary viewpoint on democracy is Robert Dahl's concept of "polyarchy". Dahl argues that "democracy" is an ideal that no country has ever achieved.

== Urban regimes ==
Theorists suggest that localized urban regimes exist and are shaped by the unique interplay of interests, institutions, and ideas within a city. They are characterized by the relationships between local government, political elites, and various institutions that all work toward specific policy goals and government structures. Jill Clark argues that these regime types are categorized by economic factors and policymaking within a community. The six urban regime types are entrepreneurial, caretaker, player, progressive, stewardship, and the demand-side.

=== Entrepreneurial ===
An entrepreneurial urban regime is defined as having strong ties to business leaders and is formed to advance a city's hierarchy in relation to other cities. This type operates in exclusive venues where important business leaders and politicians deliberate. Leaders in this type of regime focus on gathering votes for reelection by supporting projects that appeal to the community.

=== Caretaker ===
A caretaker urban regime is designed to preserve the status quo, keep taxes low, and preserve the quality of life in a city. This is often associated with taxpayers and homeowners' interests. The goal of this regime type is to lower the involvement of the government sector and increase the involvement of the private sector.

=== Player ===
A player urban regime involves active government participation in private decision making, in order to manage and resolve disputes between community groups and business. This type of regime will sometimes employ coercive governmental powers to solve crises in the community. When this regime is combined with state actions, it develops into a stewardship urban regime.

=== Progressive ===
A progressive urban regime focuses on economic equity and on reallocating the benefits of industrialized, developed society to groups or areas the regime believes need them most. These frequently include ethnic minorities, economically disadvantaged people, and neighborhoods that have undergone gentrification. These regimes become activist regimes when merged with a stewardship role.

=== Stewardship ===
Stewardship urban regimes are more adversarial toward business than an entrepreneurial regime. This type of regime prioritizes protecting community interests and the well-being of residents over the interests of large corporations. Unlike progressive urban regimes, which actively redistribute resources, stewardship regimes advocate for accountability in managing taxpayer investments instead of directly pursuing redistribution.

=== Demand-side ===
A demand-side urban regime is characterized by active and strong support for small businesses and neighborhood revitalization efforts. These regimes encourage and provide state assistance to small businesses, encouraging new enterprises via methods such as state-operated venture capital programs.

== Measuring regimes ==
There are two primary methods for measuring regimes: continuous measures of democracy, such as Freedom House (FH), Polity, and the Varieties of Democracy (V-Dem), and binary measures of democracy, for example Regimes of the World. Continuous measures classify regimes along a scale of democratic and autocratic characteristics, allowing for nuanced differentiation. Historically, these measures primarily focused on distinguishing democracies from autocracies, but have since evolved to include various gradations of governance. In contrast, binary measures classify regimes in simpler terms, categorizing them strictly as either democratic or non-democratic.

Global political participation in 2000

Some scholars argue that unless a government meets certain democratic criteria, it cannot be considered a true democracy; however, academics like Stanford professor Philippe C. Schmitter and associate professor Terry Lynn Karl suggest that democracy is better viewed as a matrix of outcomes. This matrix includes factors such as consensus, participation, access, responsiveness, majority rule, parliamentary sovereignty, party government, pluralism, federalism, presidentialism, and checks and balances, offering a more comprehensive framework to evaluate democratic practices.

The V-Dem Institute, an independent research organization, is a prominent example of continuous democracy measurement. It uses a detailed set of indicators, such as access to justice, electoral corruption, and freedom from government-sponsored violence, to assess governance quality. V-Dem relies on country experts who provide subjective ratings for these latent regime characteristics over time, contributing to one of the most comprehensive data sources on democracy worldwide.

== See also ==
- Ancien régime
- Carbon audit regime
- Exchange rate regime
- International regime
- Regime change
- Regime theory

== Citations ==
=== Sources ===
- James, Paul; Palen, Ronen (2007). Globalization and Economy, Vol. 3: Global Economic Regimes and Institutions. London: Sage Publications.
- O'Neill, Patrick, Essentials of Comparative Government
