= Danube Commission (1948) =

International river management body

- Members Observers Ex-members
- Administrative center: Budapest, Hungary
- Official languages: French; German; Russian
- Membership: Austria; Bulgaria; Croatia; Germany; Hungary; Moldova; Romania; Serbia; Slovakia; Ukraine
- Establishment: 11 May 1949
- Website www.danubecommission.org

The Danube Commission (French: Commission du Danube; German: Donaukommission; Russian: Дунайская комиссия, romanized: Dunayskaya komissiya; Ukrainian: Дунайська комісія, romanized: Dunayska komisiya) is concerned with the maintenance and improvement of navigation conditions of the Danube River, from its source in Germany to its outlets in Romania and Ukraine, leading to the Black Sea. It was established in 1948 by seven countries bordering the river, replacing previous commissions that had also included representatives of non-riparian powers. Its predecessor commissions were among the first attempts at internationalising the police powers of sovereign states for a common cause.

Members include representatives from Austria, Bulgaria, Croatia, Germany, Hungary, Moldova, Romania, Serbia, Slovakia, and Ukraine.

The commission dates to the Paris Conferences of 1856, which established for the first time an international regime to safeguard free navigation on the Danube, and of 1921, which resurrected the international regime after the First World War.

== Duties ==
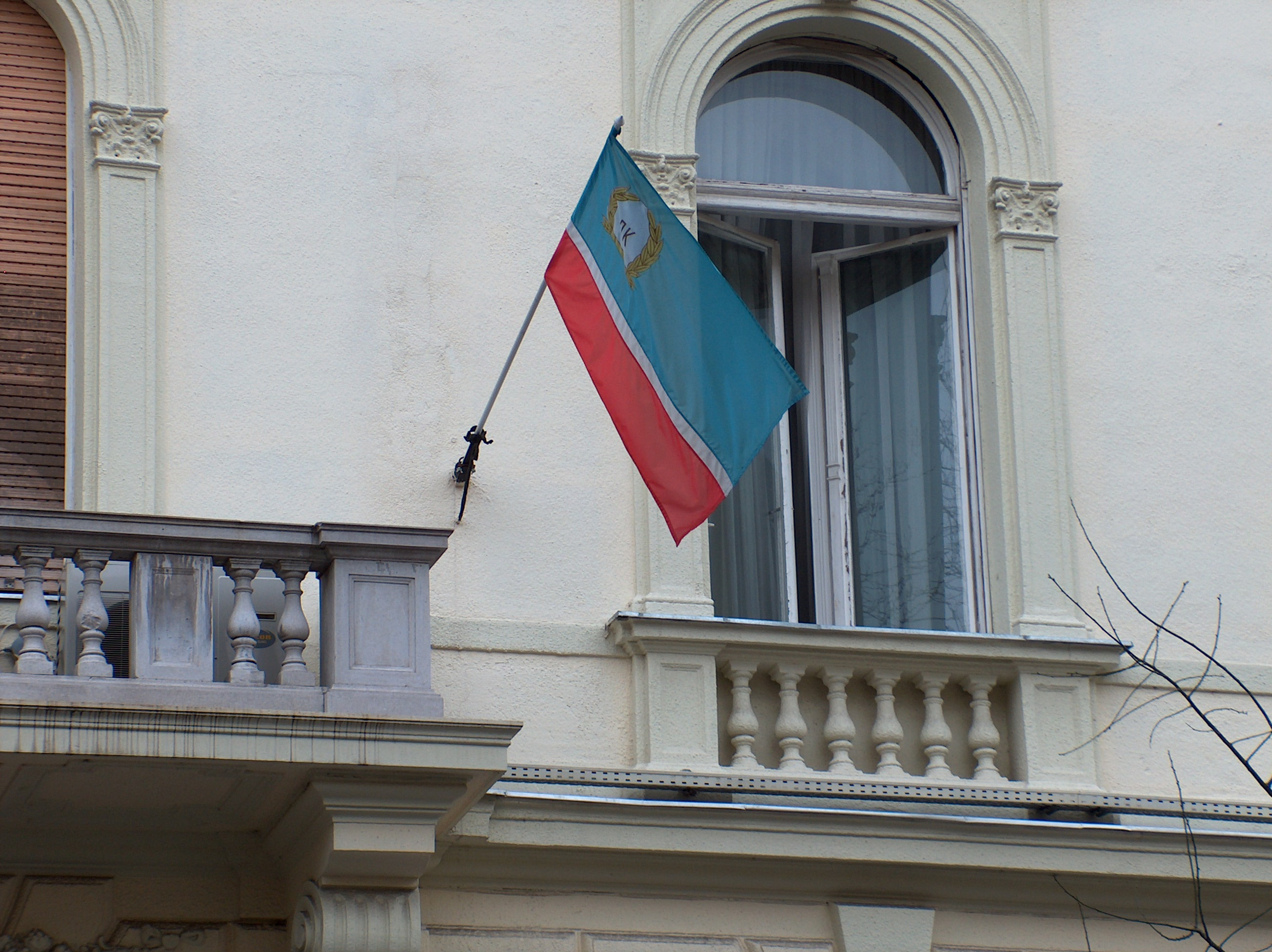
Flag of the Danube Commission in Budapest, April 2008

The commission meets regularly twice a year. It also convenes groups of experts to consider items provided for in the commission's working plans.

Its primary duties are:

- Supervising the implementation of the international convention that set it up in 1948.
- Preparing a general plan of the main works called for in the interest of navigation.
- Consulting with and making recommendations to the special administrations charged with various stretches of the river and exchanging information with them.
- Establishing a uniform system of traffic regulations on the whole navigable portion of the Danube and, taking into account the specific conditions of various sections of the river, laying down the basic provisions governing navigation on the Danube, including those governing a pilot service.
- Unifying the regulations governing river, customs and sanitary inspection.
- Harmonising regulations on inland navigation with the European Union and with the Central Commission for Navigation on the Rhine.
- Coordinating the activity of hydro-meteorological services on the Danube and publishing short-term and long-term hydrologic forecasts for the river.
- Collecting statistical data on aspects of navigation on the Danube within the commission's competence.
- Publishing reference works, sailing directions, nautical charts and atlases for purposes of navigation.

== Organisation ==
The commission elects from among its members a president, vice-president and secretary for three-year terms. Serving since 2021 are Liubov Nepop of Ukraine, Ivan Todorov of Hungary, and Gergő Kocsis of Hungary. The commission has a secretariat of 9 officers under the supervision of a director-general, who is at present Manfred Seitz from Austria.

The official languages of the commission are German, French and Russian.

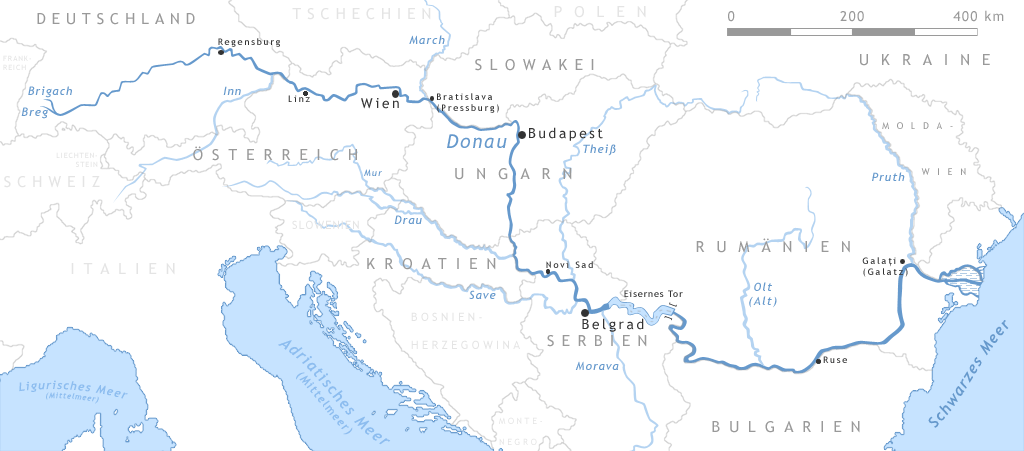
The Danube River

== Members ==
Members the Danube Commission

Name	Official name	Accession date	Changes	Note
Austria	Austria	7 January 1960		
Bulgaria	Bulgaria	11 May 1949		
Croatia	Croatia	26 March 1998		
Germany	Germany	26 March 1998		
Hungary	Hungary	11 May 1949		
Moldova	Moldova	26 March 1998		
Romania	Romania	11 May 1949		
Serbia	Serbia	5 June 2006	Member as Serbia and Montenegro since 4 Feb 2003.	
Slovakia	Slovakia	1 January 1993		
Ukraine	Ukraine	24 August 1991	Original member as Ukrainian S.S.R since 14 May 1949.	
Czechoslovakia	Czechoslovakia	11 May 1949	Dissolved 31 December 1992	
Russia	Russian Federation	25 December 1991	Expelled 1 March 2024	
Soviet Union	Soviet Union	11 May 1949	Dissolved 25 December 1991	
Yugoslavia	Yugoslavia	11 May 1949	Dissolved 4 February 2003	

== History ==
As a result of the Danube River Conference of 1948, the river system was divided into three administrations: the regular River Commission (which had existed in one form or another since 1856), a bilateral Romania–USSR administration between Brăila and the mouth of the Sulina channel, and a bilateral Romania–Yugoslavia administration at the Iron Gate. Both of the latter were technically under the control of the main commission, members of which were – at the beginning – Bulgaria, Czechoslovakia, Hungary, Romania, Ukraine, the USSR, and Yugoslavia.

=== 1949-1999 ===
==== The Cominform rift ====
When the treaty was adopted, Yugoslavia had already been expelled from the Cominform, the political grouping of all the Communist parties in the Soviet bloc. Yet it still voted down the line with the other non-Western countries, nearly 200 miles of the Danube flowing through its territory and the only navigable channel through the Iron Gate being on the Yugoslav side of the Romanian border. Nevertheless, when the new commission organised its staff, the Yugoslavs were offered only four minor posts out of sixty permanent appointments. The Josip Broz Tito government refused them all.

The commission also fixed freight rates that allegedly discriminated against Yugoslavia, Belgrade officials said. Faced with this situation,

the Yugoslav delegate to the commission has been most uncooperative. He has been a minority of one on every major question that has come up for discussion. He opposed, for example, the creation of a special administration fluviale [river administration] run by a joint Czechoslovak–Hungarian Commission to control the difficult Gabcikovo–Gönyű sector… The Yugoslavs lost by six votes to one. But they have at least got their own back by refusing to pay their share of the commission's expenses.

Another report, however, stated that it was the commission itself that "had made a determined effort to avoid accepting Yugoslavia's share in the expenses," which were even larger than the Yugoslav contribution to the United Nations.

These grievances were compounded by the vast powers wielded by the Soviet Union. At the session of 11 November 1949, a Soviet proposal was adopted vesting complete powers of appointment, organisation, leadership, and negotiation in the secretary, who was the Russian representative. By 1950,

the Soviet government [had] assumed complete control over the Commission's administrative machinery and reduced the other governments to nominal status… Yugoslav representatives [had] been excluded from every important committee.

At the May 1951 meeting, the Yugoslavs walked out, forcing adjournment. They were protesting the "railroading" of shipping regulations they thought would hurt their economy: a rule forbidding inspection of foreign ships by the nations through which they were passing. The Yugoslavs charged sabotage and infiltration by Soviet agents aboard the ships. In August, Yugoslavia told the USSR in a note that the commission's rules were "contrary in letter and spirit" to the 1948 convention, giving the Soviets control of the waterway in violation of national sovereignty.

At the commission's fifth session, in June 1952, Yugoslavia proposed the establishment of an executive committee to be composed of one representative from each country; it would control business between formal sessions of the commission. The Soviet bloc voted to study the plan "sometime between the sixth and seventh sessions." Next, Yugoslavia proposed that the top posts should be rotated among the six members every three years, but the commission rejected that suggestion in June 1953. Rumors sprang up that Yugoslavia would resign from the commission because of this treatment.

Slowly, though, the picture changed with a thaw in Yugoslav–Soviet relations. On 15 December 1953, Dragoje Djuric, a Yugoslav diplomat, was elected to the secretary's post, a Hungarian was named president and a Bulgarian vice president. A Belgrade spokesman said in glee that the sessions were unusually harmonious because the Iron Curtain countries were agreeing to "all proposals put on the agenda by the Yugoslavs," one of them being a Yugoslav–Hungarian proposal to move the commission's headquarters in 1954 from Galatz to Budapest.

Later, though, the Soviet bloc intimated the downgrading of the Danube Commission. A Vienna dispatch reported that the Council for Mutual Economic Assistance (Comecon), the Eastern European equivalent of the Marshall Plan, had created a new, permanent Danube committee of its own, its purpose to draft measures for using Danube water for power, irrigation, and navigation. It ordered at a Moscow meeting that plans be made to raise the level of the river by dams so seagoing ships could move farther upstream.

==== East–west detente ====
The Danube Commission was seen as a bridge between East and West. Czechoslovak researcher Juraj Cuth wrote in 1960 that the Danube Commission, "has become an important center of close cooperation of all the riparian states… It has turned into a forum of cooperation between representatives of socialist and capitalist states."

==== Gabčíkovo–Nagymaros Dams ====
In 1977 the Gabčíkovo–Nagymaros Dams project was initiated by the Budapest Treaty between the Czechoslovak Socialist Republic and the Hungarian People's Republic. The project aimed at preventing catastrophic floods in the Danube river, producing clean electricity by damming the river, creating reservoirs, locks for navigation and a hydro electric power plant. Slovakia took over half of the project on 1 December 1993 when the country split however Hungary had abandoned the project in 1989 and tried to get out of the agreement. The International Court of Justice was called upon to judge the case and found Hungary had breached their legal obligations in almost all points, ordering that the project be completed. It was 2017 before the legal dispute was closed.

=== 2000 - current ===
In 2000 an agreement was reached by the Danube Commission, the Central Commission for Navigation on the Rhine and the United Nations Economic Commission for Europe regarding the carriage of goods by inland waterways, which came into effect in 2005 and aims to help transport users and standardise waterway rules in Europe.

==== During Russo-Ukrainian War ====
After the beginning of the full-scale Russian invasion of Ukraine during the 12th extraordinary session on 17 March 2022 the Representatives of the member states adopted the Decision concerning the military aggression by the Russian Federation against Ukraine, violating the basic principles of the Belgrade Convention (doc. DC/SES-XII Extr./3). According to this decision the full powers of all representatives of the Russian Federation have been declined; they have been excluded from participation in all meetings at the Danube Commission and its working bodies until the restoration of peace, sovereignty and territorial integrity of Ukraine within its internationally recognised borders.

During its 100th session on 14 December 2023 the Danube Commission decided that Russian membership is incompatible given its missile and drone strikes on the Lower Danube. Russia must leave by 29 February 2024, or the Commission’s members will no longer recognise their commitments to Russia under the founding Belgrade Convention.

== Future plans ==
In 2019 and with a majority of members of the commission being EU members, harmonisation with EU transport plans is envisaged, as is a modernisation of the commission to include non Danube river members and to increase the powers of the commission. France, Turkey and the European Union have declared they want to become members.

== See also ==
A series of articles on this subject in chronological order

- Internationalisation of the Danube River, for events from earliest times to the Treaty of Paris in 1856
- Commissions of the Danube River, for the international body governing the waterway from 1856 to 1940
- Nazi rule over the Danube River, for events during World War II
- Danube River Conference of 1948
- International Commission for the Protection of the Danube River, for the organisation established in 1998 and charged with environmental and ecological activities
