= Internationalization of the Danube River =

Diplomatic process in 19th-century Europe

Naval ensign used on Danube Commission vessels from 1881

The Danube River has been a trade waterway for centuries, but with the rise of international borders and the jealousies of national states, commerce and shipping has often been hampered for reasons of conflict and parochialism rather than cooperation between various powers in control of parts of the river. In addition, natural features of the river, most notably the sanding of the Danube Delta, has often hampered international trade. For these reasons, diplomats over the decades have worked to internationalize the Danube River in an attempt to allow commerce to flow as smoothly as possible.

Rivalry among the great powers — particularly Great Britain and Russia — hindered such cooperation, but in 1856, at the end of the Crimean War, it was finally decided to establish an international organization where they all could work together on behalf of the Danube.

== British and Russian rivalry ==
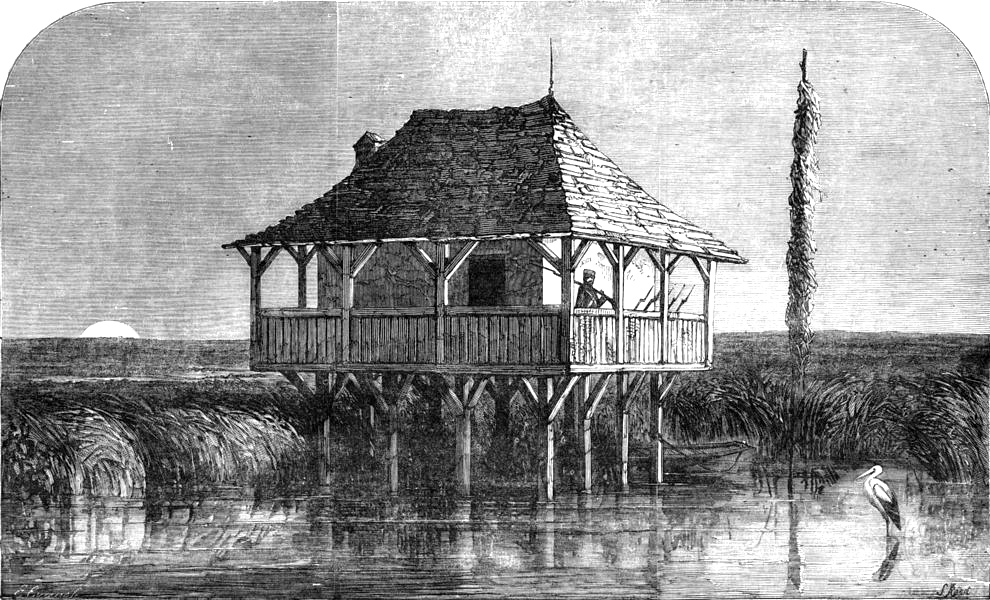
Military post on the Danube during the Crimean War, 1853, Illustrated London News

In 1616 an Austro-Turkish treaty was signed in Belgrade wherein the Austrians were granted the right to navigate the middle and lower Danube, at that time under the control of the Ottoman Empire. Under the 1774 Treaty of Küçük Kaynarca, ending a war between Russia and Turkey, Russia was allowed to use the lower Danube.

The Treaty of Adrianople, ending the Russo-Turkish War (1828–29), and signed on September 14, 1829, between Russia and the Ottoman Empire, provided a legal basis for excluding all foreign ships from the river delta. It gave Russia the right to establish quarantine stations on the Sulina Channel (the only one actually navigable), and seven years later she made use of it. British trade began in 1834. On February 7, 1836, Russia published a decree that all Danube-bound vessels would be stopped and taken to the Russian port of Odessa for quarantine inspection.

By 1836, things had got to the point where the British House of Commons debated the subject. Patrick Maxwell Stewart told his fellows on April 20:

British enterprise has found its way to these [Danubian] provinces; and already the jealous power of Russia has assailed to obstruct its success. . . . In 1836 there will be 5,000 tons [in trade] and upwards, if Russia is pleased to permit our subjects to exercise their just and lawful right. But . . . she has already interfered, and the matter must now and immediately be brought to an issue. . . . Russia has dared to offer insult to England by laying hands upon British shipping, and demanding tribute at the mouth of the Danube. . . . there cannot be a doubt but that Russia's determination is to close up the Danube entirely, and thus to stop ou[r] growing trade with the principalities.

In 1840, Russia agreed in a treaty signed with Austria at St. Petersburg to keep the Sulina Channel open; for this purpose it would be allowed to tax vessels entering the river. The Russians brought in two dredging machines. One English account said they were "worked by manual labour for one day and then laid aside forever." Another account, written about the same time, had another version: The author claimed that the Turks (friendly to England at this time) had kept the channel clear

by the simple expedient of requiring every vessel leaving to draw after her an iron rake; this was sufficient to stir the mud, and the current of the great river took it away. Muscovite artifice rejected this method as only worthy of Turkish barbarism, and went through the form of occasionally using a steam dredging machine.

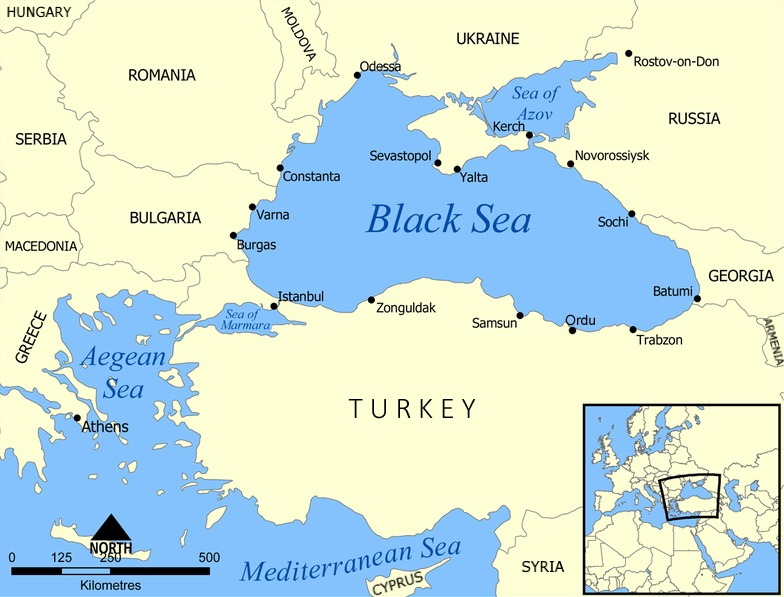
Modern map of the Black Sea. Odessa is the port at the top.

By 1851, Russians had changed their tactics. They set up quarantine stations in the delta itself and promulgated a new set of stringent regulations, which had as a purpose the frightening of shipping from the Danube to Odessa. For example, they declared that vessels visiting lower Danubian ports had to be held in a fourteen-day quarantine, while at Black Sea ports of Russia itself the quarantine was only four days.

In the same year, an English writer called the Russian inspectors "crude, barbarous and political." Another Englishman wrote in 1854 that the fertility of Moldavia and Wallachia was "not a mere geographical fact, but a subject fraught with the utmost importance; for the size of our [British] labourer's loaves varies with the depth of the water on the bar of the Danube."

There is, perhaps, no instance in which the seemingly tortuous, yet ever steadily aggressive and grasping character of Russian policy can be better marked than in her conduct at the Sulina mouth of the Danube.

In 1856, the mouths of the Danube River were wild passages, littered with wrecks of sailing ships and hazarded with hidden sandbars. The banks of the river were sometimes indicated only by clusters of wretched hovels built on piles, and by narrow patches of sand, skirted by tall weeds.

Edward D. Krehbiel, writing in 1918, observed that Russia had probably been "aggravating the already bad conditions for the purpose of hindering commerce on the Danube and increasing that of Odessa." Meanwhile, Russia continued to levy its taxes (it was estimated that the total tax burden amounted to 50 percent of the produce), and the channel remained clogged. Even the Austrians were upset with this, and the Treaty of St. Petersburg was renewed only once before they allowed it to lapse.

== Demands for control ==
Napoleonic France at the Congress of Rastatt in 1798 made the first public governmental proposal for internationalizing the river, but "it was doomed to failure for political reasons," meeting with resistance from the Habsburg monarchs.

After Napoleon's fall the British joined the call for internationalization. In September 1850, Charles Cunningham, British vice-consul at Galatz, Romania, wrote that "the different nations interested in the navigation of the Danube should name commissioners (as seems to be done on the Rhine), and the Commission [should] . . . attend to the duties of clearing the Sulina."

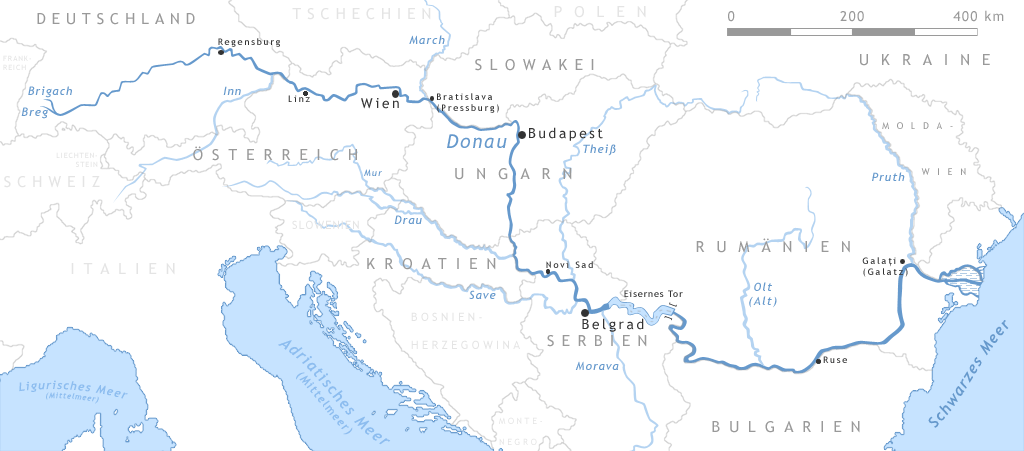
Modern map of the Danube (in German). Galatz is the first dot upstream from the Black Sea, and the Sulina channel is the middle one in the delta (right). Click here for a larger version of this map.

In 1851 one English journalist wrote that "a commission might be named by the governments connected with the trade, in order that the respective commissioners might watch over the interests of the shipping of their country, as exists on the Rhine. Another wrote in 1854:

The capacities of this great river as a commercial highway are certainly unequalled by those of any other European stream; and their full employment would be of incalculable advantage not merely to the countries on its banks but to all commercial nations. . . . The natural difficulties of the navigation are indeed great, but capable of being easily removed.

On December 28, 1854, during the Crimean War (France, Britain, Sardinia, and Turkey versus the Russian Empire), the allies sent to Russia a note urging the internationalization of the river as one of the bases for a peace treaty:

. . . it would be desirable that the course of the Lower Danube . . . be withdrawn from the territorial jurisdiction. . . . In every case the free navigation of the Danube could not be secured if it be not placed under the control of a syndical authority, invested with the powers necessary to destroy the obstructions existing at the mouths of the river, or which may hereafter be formed there.

== Internationalization ==
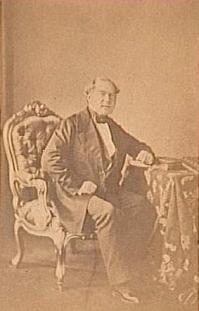
François Adolphe Bourqueney of France

On March 15, 1855, representatives of five monarchies gathered around a table in Vienna, the capital of the Austrian Empire in an attempt to end the bloody war in the Crimea. Appearing for Great Britain were Lord John Russell and the Earl of Westmoreland. France sent its chief diplomatist, François Adolphe Bourqueney. Austria was represented by Count Karl Ferdinand von Buol-Schauenstein and Baron Anton von Prokesch-Osten, while the Ottoman Empire sent Aarif Effendi and Russia Prince Alexander Mihailovich Gortschakoff. Later, the negotiators were reinforced by the arrival of Foreign Ministers Drouyn de Lhuys of France and Mehmed Emin Âli Pasha of the Ottoman Empire. The second point on the agenda was what to do about the Danube River.

Prince Gortschakoff stipulated that navigation should be free and that Russia favored an international control agency, but he objected to the use of the phrase syndical authority (syndicat in French) "because it was vague and new." He said if syndicat implied any exercise of sovereignty, he must oppose it because the Danube "must be kept free of all political considerations." Baron Bourqueney replied that "the syndicat ought to represent the interests of all. Later the conference agreed to substitute the phrase European Commission.

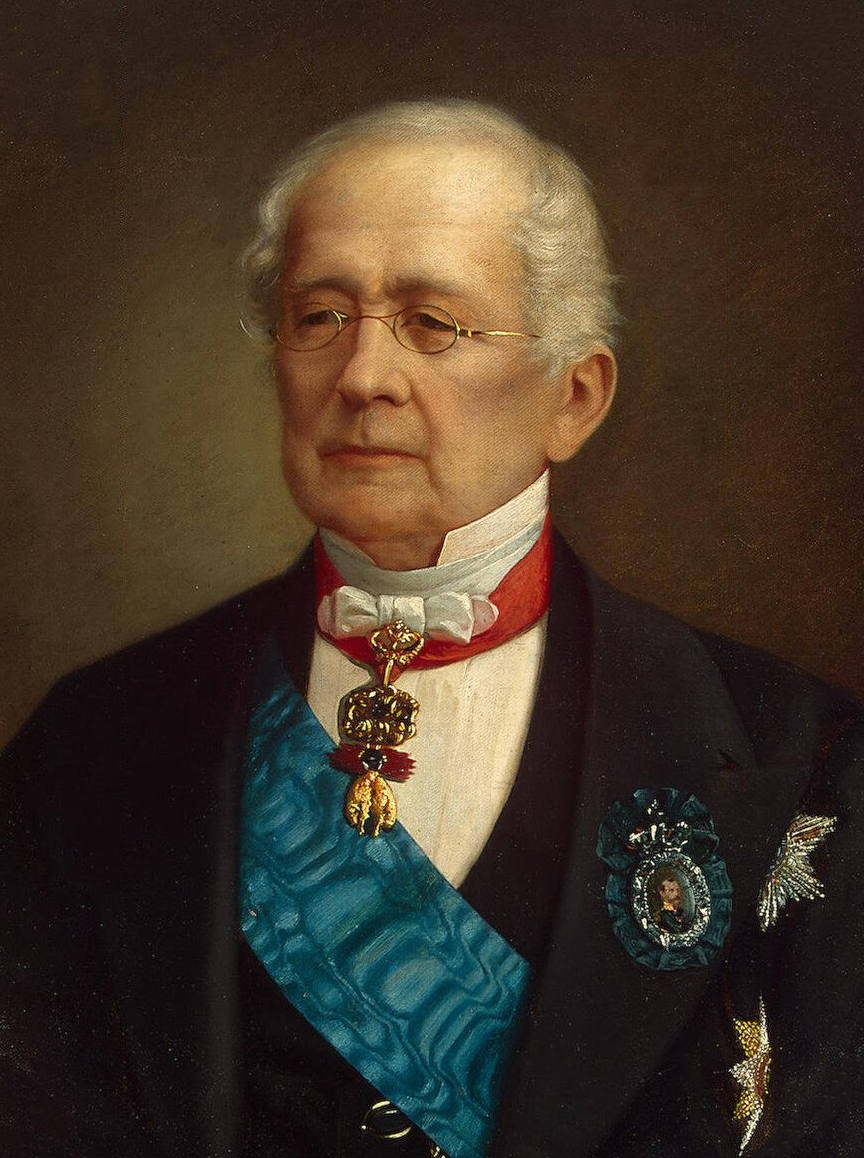
Alexander Mihailovich Gortschakoff of Russia

Foreshadowing a dispute that was to last until 1948 — whether the nations bordering the river should control it or share authority with the major shipping powers — a dispute immediately arose over the composition and powers of the new commission. The delegates finally decided to establish two bodies — a Delta group composed of the European powers, and a separate, river commission.

An European commission, formed of delegates from each of the Contracting Powers, shall determine the . . . means to be employed to keep the navigation free, and shall draw up the instructions for a River-bordering commission, composed of delegates of Austria, Russia, and Turkey.

Nevertheless, the Vienna conference failed over the future of the Black Sea, and the Crimean War went on, only to be ended the next year by the Treaty of Paris (1856). The victors, led by Britain and Austria, excluded Russia from the "River-bordering commission" by the simple expedient of rolling back its borders from the Danube banks in favor of Turkey.

Britain was winning in its attempt to hobble Russia, and the creation of the European Danube Commission was successful in "postponing a showdown for another ninety years." Though Russia did have a seat on the latter commission, its primary influence on the Delta was halted. Professor John C. Campbell wrote in 1949 that the commission became "a symbol and sentinel of the political interest of the West in preserving Southeastern Europe and Turkey from Russian domination."

The European Commission of the Danube, with members Great Britain, Austria, France, Prussia, Russia, Sardinia and Turkey, was established on a supposedly temporary basis by the Treaty of Paris in 1856 but, as The Times of London said, the body became a "striking example of the durability of the provisional," because it was never dissolved. The Times continued:

A series of prolongations confirmed its existence and strengthened its privileges, which came to include its own flag, police and courts. Its seat was at Galatz, and its powers extended from Braila to the sea. It did excellent technical work, and the volume of shipping on the lower Danube grew rapidly. After 1918 only Great Britain, France Italy and Rumania were members of the Commission, till Germany was readmitted in March, 1939. Above Braila there was no international control until after the first world war.

== See also ==
A series of articles on this subject in chronological order

- Commissions of the Danube River, for the international body governing the waterway from 1856 to 1940
- Nazi rule over the Danube River, for events during World War II
- Danube River Conference of 1948
- Danube Commission, for events since 1948
- International Commission for the Protection of the Danube River, for the organization established in 1998 and charged with environmental and ecological activities
