= International regime =

An international regime is the set of implicit or explicit principles, norms, rules, and decision-making procedures that international actors’ expectations converge around in a given area of international relations. These regimes guide and structure interactions between international actors and, in some cases, may evolve into an intergovernmental organization.

== Definition and types ==
Stephen D. Krasner defines international regimes as "sets of implicit or explicit principles, norms, rules, and decision-making procedures around which actors' expectations converge in a given area of international relations". Regimes "are more specialized arrangements that pertain to well-defined activities, resources, or geographical areas and often involve only some subset of the members of international society", according to Oran R. Young. Robert Keohane and Joseph Nye define regimes as "sets of governing arrangements" that include "networks of rules, norms, and procedures that regularize behavior and control its effects." Ernst Haas has argued that a regime encompasses a mutually coherent set of procedures, rules, and norms. Moreover, Hedley Bull refers to the importance of rules and institutions in international society where rules refer to "general imperative principles which require or authorize certain prescribed classes of persons or groups to behave in prescribed ways."

Krasner has stated that the purpose of international regimes is to facilitate agreements. Keohane has noted that a basic analytic distinction must be made between regimes and agreements as agreements are often ad-hoc, or “one-shot,” arrangements. Moreover, an international regime can be said to be distinct from an international order because “regimes must be understood as something more than temporary arrangements that change with every shift in power or interests."

Types of regimes include international conventions such as the Basel Convention, the Mediterranean Action Plan and well-known regimes like the Bretton Woods System of monetary management. Additionally, international organizations can be considered part of international regimes when they serve as governance structures within these broader frameworks.

== Formation ==
International regimes often emerge in response to the need for coordination among countries around a particular issue. In the absence of such a regime, for example, telecommunications between countries might be governed by numerous bilateral agreements, which would become impractically complex to manage on a global scale. A regime such as the International Telecommunication Union (ITU) provides a forum, multilateral treaty, and governing body to streamline telecommunications standards internationally. Other examples of international regimes include International Monetary Fund, Biological Weapons Convention, and Kyoto Protocol.

Kyoto Protocol Parties

The number of international regimes has increased dramatically since the World War II, and today regimes cover almost all aspects of international relations that might require coordination among countries, from security issues (such as weapons non-proliferation or collective defense), to trade, finance, and investment, information and communication, human rights, the environment, and the management of outer space—to name a few. These regimes are dynamic and evolving processes as they are shaped by the ongoing interactions of their participants, and no fixed arrangements exist between them.

Some scholars emphasize the importance of a hegemon in creating a regime and giving it momentum. This is called the hegemonic stability theory. The United States, for example, has been instrumental in creating the Bretton Woods system, with organizations such as the World Bank and the International Monetary Fund. The rationale is that a hegemon, being the dominant actor in international politics and economics, often stands to gain the most from the creation of global standards. For instance, while other countries might benefit from it, U.S. companies like Microsoft, Universal Studios, and Pfizer would be among the greatest beneficiaries of a strict global intellectual property regime.

While the creation of such regimes may enhance global stability and order, the withdrawal of a hegemon from these arrangements can undermine the effectiveness of these regimes, as seen in various instances where the dominant power scales back its engagement.

== Proponents and critics ==
Regimes serve crucial functional needs in international relations. Powerful regimes are considered by some scholars as independent actors in international politics. Although ultimately states create and sustain regimes, once institutionalized, regimes can exert influence in world politics that is practically independent of state sovereignty. The International Atomic Energy Agency, for instance, has certain rights, given to it by states themselves, to monitor nuclear energy activity in countries. Insofar as they are organized by means of treaties among countries, regimes provide an important source of formal international law. Regimes themselves can also be subjects of international law. Insofar as they shape the behavior of states, the most influential regimes can also be a source of customary international law. In this light, some liberal scholars see in regimes the early seeds of peaceful world governance, in the vein of philosopher Immanuel Kant's idea of perpetual peace through a federation of world's states.

Critics of regimes deplore their influence as a source of additional conflict or inefficiency in world politics. The security regime organized around the United Nations Security Council is sometimes cited as a case in point. Some other scholars are also alarmed that regimes represent a dilution of democratic control. Although they govern and influence important aspects of life, they operate steps removed from domestic democratic politics, organized around a legislature. In effect, some critics argue, most regimes come to represent the technocratic views of international civil servants, with agreements made behind closed doors, rather than being subject to openness and democratic popular representation. Some regimes, such as the World Trade Organization (WTO) have tried to address this "democratic deficit" by establishing civilian affairs departments, which are supposed to act as a liaison to the popular will. Most regimes are still insulated from the direct democratic politics that happen within states. Some, however, consider such insulation necessary, since much of international coordination require specialized expertise provided best by technocrats.

== See also ==
- Danube River Conference of 1948
- International Organization
- Regime theory
- United Nations Security Council
