= Danube River Conference of 1948 =

International diplomatic meeting

[For Russia, the Danube has always been] the life-line of the Empire! It is also the symbol of her historic Drang nach Westen — an extension of the Czarist policies originating in the 18th Century.

— American historian.

The Danube River Conference of 1948 was held in Belgrade, Yugoslavia, to develop a new international regime for the development and control of the Danube in the wake of World War II. It was the first postwar conference pitting the victorious Allies of the West against the Soviet Union and its allied states of Eastern Europe, in which the latter held a majority and were expected to win all points of disagreement between the two sides. As such, it attracted more than the usual share of attention from East and West alike.

The major result of the conference was known as the Belgrade Convention, which ousted the non-Danubian powers from the international agencies that had controlled the commerce and physical care of the river for decades.

== Pre-conference maneuvering ==
Postwar discussion of the Danube River was begun by the United States in 1945 when President Harry S. Truman proposed at the Potsdam Conference that freedom of navigation should be assured on Europe's inland waterways. Britain and France were concerned with reestablishing their prewar positions as members of the European Commission of the Danube, which was the prewar administrative body. In 1947, the Paris Peace Treaties signed with Romania, Hungary, and Bulgaria guaranteed free navigation.The foreign ministers of Great Britain, France, the USSR, and the United States stipulated that:

Navigation on the Danube shall be free and open for the nationals, vessels of commerce and goods of all states, on a footing of equality in regard to port and navigation charges and conditions for merchant shipping. The foregoing shall not apply to traffic between ports of the same state.

The Big Four also decided that a conference should be held within six months after the treaties came into force "to work out a new convention regarding the regime of the Danube." In February 1948 the United States proposed calling a conference, thus averting a multilateral pact that might have been concluded among the Eastern European countries.

Germany, still without a government and under four-power control, could not be represented, but the United States championed the entry of Austria. The latter, however, was rejected by the eastern bloc on the grounds they were still at war. As a compromise, it was agreed that Austria would attend as a consultant only. The four major powers, with Yugoslavia (then under the control of Marshal Tito and the Communist Party), issued invitations. Austria was occupied by the four powers but with a government granted some autonomy.

== East versus west ==
The conference caught the attention of the Eastern and Western press immediately. For months, Russia and Eastern Europe had been on the losing side of nearly every vote of importance in the United Nations sessions at Lake Success, New York. In Belgrade, though, the West was in the minority. Soviet Foreign Minister Andrei Vishinsky told the Western delegates: "The door was open for you to come in. The door is open for you to leave, if that is what you wish."

[The Danube] has always been a political question. As a commercial route it has never lived up to its potentialities. Those Powers which have been concerned with opening or closing it have been more interested in their influence and control in the Danubian region than in navigation on the river itself.

— Eastern European specialist
in the U.S. State Department

Vishinsky said that the Danubian countries (the USSR now being one of them as a result of reclaiming its old province of Bessarabia) would draw up a convention and put it into force "regardless of the minority opinion." For this purpose, the Soviet Union introduced a draft convention. So did the United States, but the conference spurned it.

The delegates also rejected a Western attempt to have Austria seated, if not at the conference, then in the international commission that the meeting was developing. The final draft said only that Austria would become a member after a peace was signed. Germany was left out of the final draft altogether.

A U.S. proposal that the new commission be brought into some kind of liaison with the United Nations, through appeal to the International Court of Justice in case of dispute and in periodic reports to the Economic and Social Council, was also defeated.

America came to the table with a full delegation of experienced transportation men, maritime lawyers, and other experts who worked out a detailed draft convention. When U.S. Delegate Cavendish Cannon explained the reasons for each article of the American draft, one State Department official observed,

some of the satellite Eastern European delegates seated round the table may have recognized the weight of those arguments. Indirectly, they may reach the people of those countries. . . . Nations for which the Danube is a principal route to world markets can scarcely feel happy, in the long run, about a system which puts control of that route in the hands of a single Great Power. . . . All the western Powers could hope to do at Belgrade was to show that their plans for the Danube were conceived to benefit the Danubian nations themselves as well as non-riparian states, and to prove that the charge of imperialism in the Danube basin lay not against the West but against Russia.

The United States, he said, was trying to

focus the debate on the major points of difference between the Soviet and the American drafts. . . . The United States was convinced . . . that the Soviet convention was designed not to guarantee freedom of navigation but to give a legal basis for the existing system of Soviet control over the river. To prove this point, it framed its amendments and concentrated its arguments on a few main issues.

Britain and France, however, were less idealistic. Ignoring the fact that they had agreed in 1938 to turn the European Commission of the Danube over to the river-bordering powers (headed by Nazi Germany), they insisted that the Convention of 1921 was still in force and that their rights could not be abolished without their consent.

To illustrate this distinction, the American magazine Life commented that:

U.S. Delegate Cavendish Cannon often talked and acted as though merely technical matters were involved and, in the words of one correspondent, showed "all the brilliance of a cigar-store Indian." . . . Only Britain's Sir Charles Peake put up a strong and vigorous fight for the Western cause.

== The decision ==
The seven Danubian nations voted to adopt the Soviet draft, with a few changes proposed in the conference by Vishinsky. Britain, France, the U.S., and Austria announced their refusal to sign. The U.K. and France took no part in the final vote, on the grounds that the whole thing was illegal. The U.S. abstained in individual article votes and voted against the document as a whole. The conference closed on August 18.

The West suffered a slight financial loss in the deal, the new treaty having set up a new Danube Commission that assumed all the assets of the old international Danube conventions but not of the liabilities — which included loans that Britain, France, and Italy had made. A year later, parallel copies of a note rejecting the new convention were dispatched by the United States, the United Kingdom, France, Belgium, Italy, and Greece to the six Eastern nations, ignoring Ukraine. Six months later, in March 1950, the Soviet Union replied that it did not agree and that the new convention "eliminated previous injustices and established jurisdiction over the river by the countries through which or along which the river actually flowed."

The river system was thenceforth divided into three administrations — the regular River Commission, a bilateral Romania-USSR administration between Brăila and the mouth of the Sulina channel, and a bilateral Romania-Yugoslavia administration at the Iron Gates. Both of the latter were technically under the control of the main commission, members of which were Bulgaria, Czechoslovakia, Hungary, Romania, Ukraine, the USSR, and Yugoslavia.

== Governments taking part ==
=== Signatories ===
Listed in the order of and under the names recorded by the Danube Commission

- Union of Soviet Socialist Republics
- People's Republic of Bulgaria
- Republic of Hungary
- People's Republic of Romania
- Ukrainian Soviet Socialist Republic
- Republic of Czechoslovakia
- Federal People's Republic of Yugoslavia

=== Voting against ===
- United States of America

=== Abstaining ===
- United Kingdom
- France

=== Consultant ===
- Austria

== See also ==
A series of articles on this subject in chronological order

- Commissions of the Danube River, authorized in 1856 to manage and improve the shipping channels of the Danube
- Nazi rule over the Danube River (1938–1945)
- Danube Commission (after 1945)
- International Commission for the Protection of the Danube River, organized in 1998 for conservation, improvement, and rational use of Danube waters
