= Secondary school =

Institution where adolescents learn

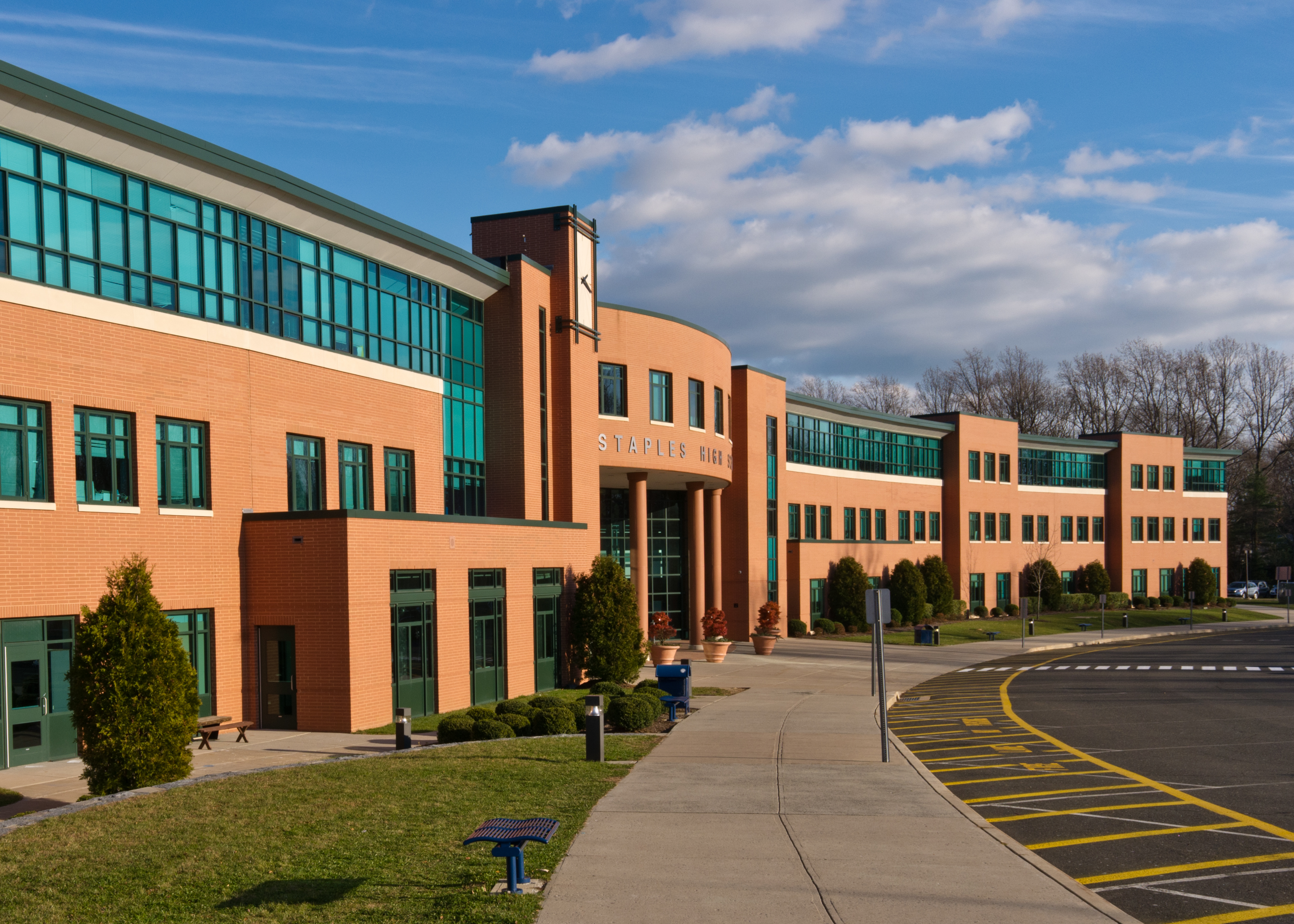
Staples High School in Westport, Connecticut, US

A secondary school, high school, or senior school, is an institution that provides students with secondary education. Some secondary schools provide both lower secondary education (ages 11 to 14) and upper secondary education (ages 14 to 18), i.e., both levels 2 and 3 of the ISCED scale, but these can also be provided in separate schools. There may be other variations in the provision: for example, children in Australia, Hong Kong, and Spain change from the primary to secondary systems a year later at the age of 12, with the ISCED's first year of lower secondary being the last year of primary provision.

In the US, most local secondary education systems have separate middle schools and high schools. Middle schools usually cover grades 6–8 or 7–8 (serving students ages 11 to 14), and high schools typically cover grades 9–12 (serving students ages 14 to 18). In the United Kingdom, most secondary state schools and privately funded schools accommodate pupils between the ages of 11 and 16 or between 11 and 18, and some UK private schools, i.e. public schools, admit pupils between the ages of 13 and 18. In South Africa, primary school runs from grade 1-7 and high school from grade 8-12, with no middle school.

Secondary schools follow on from primary schools and prepare for vocational or tertiary education. In high- and middle-income countries, attendance is usually compulsory for students at least until age 16. The organisations, buildings, and terminology are more or less unique in each country.

== Levels of education ==
In the ISCED 2014 education scale, levels 2 and 3 correspond to secondary education which are as follows:

Lower secondary education
First stage of secondary education building on primary education, typically with a more subject-oriented curriculum. Students are generally around 11 – 15 years old.

Upper secondary education: Second stage of secondary education and final stage of formal education for students typically aged 15 – 18, preparing for tertiary/adult education or providing skills relevant to employment, usually with an increased range of subject options and streams.

== Terminology ==
Within the English-speaking world, there are three widely used systems to describe the age of the child. The first is the "equivalent ages"; then countries that base their education systems on the "English model" use one of two methods to identify the year group, while countries that base their systems on the "American K–12 model" refer to their year groups as "grades". The Irish model is structured similarly to the English model, but differs significantly in terms of labels. This terminology extends into the research literature. Below is a comparison of some countries:

Secondary cohorts
| Location | | Terminology | Equivalent age | | | | | | |
| Location | | Terminology | 11–12 | 12–13 | 13–14 | 14–15 | 15–16 | 16–17 | 17–18 |
|---|---|---|---|---|---|---|---|---|---|
| Australia | | Year | (Note: The year children are aged 11–12 years is not a part of secondary school.) | 7 | 8 | 9 | 10 | 11 | 12 |
| Australia | | Grouping | (Note: The year children are aged 11–12 years is not a part of secondary school.) | Junior high school | | | Senior high school | | |
| Canada | | Year | | 7 | 8 | 9 | 10 | 11 | 12 |
| Canada | | Grouping | | Junior high school | | | Senior high school | | |
| Hong Kong | | Secondary/form | | 1 | 2 | 3 | 4 | 5 | 6 |
| Hong Kong | | Grouping | | Junior secondary | | | Senior secondary | | |
| India | | Grade | 6 | 7 | 8 | 9 | 10 | 11 | 12 |
| India | | Grouping | Upper Primary | | Secondary / High School | | | Higher Secondary / Senior Secondary | |
| Indonesia | | Grade | 6 | 7 | 8 | 9 | 10 | 11 | 12 |
| Indonesia | | Nickname | SD Kelas 6 | SMP Kelas 7 | SMP Kelas 8 | SMP Kelas 9 | SMA Kelas 10 | SMA Kelas 11 | SMA Kelas 12 |
| Ireland | | Other name | | Junior Cycle | | | Senior Cycle | | |
| Ireland | | Class & year | 6th Class | 1st Year | 2nd Year | 3rd Year | 4th Year | 5th Year | 6th Year |
| Jamaica | | Form | First | Second | Third | Fourth | Fifth | Lower Sixth (6B) | Upper Sixth (6A) |
| Jamaica | | Year | 7 | 8 | 9 | 10 | 11 | 12 | 13 |
| Jamaica | | Grouping | Lower School | | | Upper School | | Sixth Form Programme | |
| Japan | | Grade | | 1 | 2 | 3 | 1 | 2 | 3 |
| Japan | | Grouping | | Junior high school | | | Senior high school | | |
| Philippines | | Grade | | 7 | 8 | 9 | 10 | 11 | 12 |
| Philippines | | Grouping | | Junior high school | | | | Senior high school | |
| Singapore | | Secondary | | 1 | 2 | 3 | 4 | 5 (Note: Only applicable to students taking Normal (Academic). Rest of the students will progress to post-secondary education.) | (Note: The year children are aged 17–18 years is not a part of secondary school.) |
| Singapore | | Grouping | | Lower Secondary | | Upper Secondary | | | (Note: The year children are aged 17–18 years is not a part of secondary school.) |
| Spain | | Grade | | 1 | 2 | 3 | 4 | 1 | 2 |
| Spain | | Grouping | | ESO (Mandatory Secondary Education) | | | | Bachillerato | |
| United Kingdom | England / Wales | Form | First | Second | Third | Fourth | Fifth | Lower Sixth | Upper Sixth |
| United Kingdom | England / Wales | Year | 7 | 8 | 9 | 10 | 11 | 12 | 13 |
| United Kingdom | Scotland | Year | | S1 | S2 | S3 | S4 | S5 | S6 |
| United Kingdom | Northern Ireland | Year | 8 | 9 | 10 | 11 | 12 | 13 | 14 |
| United States | | Grade | 6 | 7 | 8 | 9 | 10 | 11 | 12 |
| United States | | Nickname | | | | Freshman | Sophomore | Junior | Senior |
| United States | | Grouping | Middle School (in most systems) | | | High School (in most systems) | | | |
| ISCED level | | | 2 | | | 3 | | | |

== Legal framework ==
Schools exist within a strict legal framework where they may be answerable to their government through local authorities and their stakeholders. In England there are six general types of state-funded schools running in parallel to the private sector. The state takes an interest in safeguarding issues in all schools. All state-funded schools in England are legally required to have a website where they must publish details of their governance, finance, curriculum intent and staff and pupil protection policies to comply with The School Information (England) (Amendment) Regulations 2012 and 2016. Ofsted monitors these.

== Theoretical framework ==
School building design does not happen in isolation. The building or school campus needs to accommodate:

- Curriculum content
- Teaching methods
- Costs
- Education within the political framework
- Use of school building (also in the community setting)
- Constraints imposed by the site
- Design philosophy

Each country will have a different education system and priorities. Schools need to accommodate students, staff, storage, mechanical and electrical systems, support staff, ancillary staff, and administration. The number of rooms required can be determined from the predicted roll of the school and the area needed.

According to standards used in the United Kingdom, a general classroom for 30 students needs to be 55 m^{2}, or more generously 62 m^{2}. A general art room for 30 students needs to be 83 m^{2}, but 104 m^{2} for 3D textile work. A drama studio or a specialist science laboratory for 30 needs to be 90 m^{2}. Examples are given on how this can be configured for a 1,200 place secondary (practical specialism). and 1,850 place secondary school.

== Size ==
The ideal size for a typical comprehensive high school is large enough to offer a variety of classes, but small enough that students develop a sense of community. Some research has suggested that academic achievement is best when there are about 150 to 250 students in each grade level, and that above a total school size of 2,000 for a secondary school, academic achievement and the sense of school community decline substantially.

Arguments in favor of smaller schools include having a shared experience of school (e.g., everyone takes the same classes, because the school is too small to offer alternatives), higher average academic achievement, and lower educational inequality.

Arguments in favor of larger schools tend to focus on economy of scale. For example, a single basketball court could serve a school with 200 students just as well as a school with 500 students, so construction and maintenance costs, on a per-student basis, can be lower for larger schools. However, cost savings from larger schools have generally not materialized, as larger schools require more administrative support staff, and rural areas see the potential savings offset by increased transportation costs.

Larger schools can also support more specialization, such as splitting students into advanced, average, and basic tracks, offering a greater variety of classes, or sponsoring a greater number of extra-curricular activities. (Some of these benefits can also be achieved through smaller but specialized schools, such as a dedicated special school for students with disabilities or a magnet school for students with a particular subject-matter interest.)

In terms of structure, organization, and relationships, larger schools tend to be more hierarchical and bureaucratic, with fewer and weaker personal connections and more rigidly defined, unvarying roles for all staff. Teachers find that large schools result in more information to process in the larger environment (e.g., announcements about 100 programs instead of just 10) and that as individuals, they form fewer relationships with teachers outside of their primary subject area. Smaller schools have less social isolation and more engagement. These effects cannot be entirely overcome through implementation of a house system or "school within a school" programs.

== Building design specifications ==
The building providing the education has to fulfill the needs of: students, teachers, non-teaching support staff, administrators, and the community. It has to meet general government building guidelines, health requirements, minimal functional requirements for classrooms, toilets and showers, electricity and services, preparation and storage of textbooks, and basic teaching aids. An optimum secondary school will meet the minimum conditions and will have:

- adequately-sized classrooms;
- specialized teaching spaces;
- a staff preparation room;
- an administration block;
- multipurpose classrooms;
- a general-purpose school hall;
- laboratories for science, technology, mathematics, and life sciences, as may be required;
- adequate equipment;
- a library or library stocks that are regularly renewed; and
- computer rooms or media centres.

A secondary school may have a canteen, serving a set of foods to students, and storage where the equipment of a school is kept.

Government accountants, having read the advice then publish minimum guidelines on schools. These enable environmental modelling and establishing building costs. Future design plans are audited to ensure that these standards are met but not exceeded. Government ministries continue to press for the "minimum" space and cost standards to be reduced.

The UK government published this downwardly revised space formula in 2014. It said the floor area should be 1050 m^{2} (+ 350 m^{2} if there is a sixth form) + 6.3 m^{2}/pupil place for 11- to 15-year-olds + 7 m^{2}/pupil place for students above 16 years old. The external finishes were to be downgraded to meet a build cost of £1113/m^{2}.

== By country ==
A secondary school locally may be called a high school (abbreviated as HS or H.S.), or called a senior high school. In some countries, there are two phases to secondary education (ISCED 2) and (ISCED 3). The junior high school, intermediate school, lower secondary school, or middle school occurs between the primary school (ISCED 1) and high school.

Names for secondary schools by country

- Argentina: secundaria or polimodal, escuela secundaria
- Australia: high school, secondary college
- Austria: Gymnasium (Ober- & Unterstufe), Hauptschule, Höhere Bundeslehranstalt (HBLA), Höhere Technische Lehranstalt (HTL)
- Azerbaijan: orta məktəb
- Bangladesh: Maddhomik Biddalay or secondary school (grades 6–10)
- Bahamas: junior high (grades 7–9), senior high (grades 10–12)
- Belgium: secundair onderwijs/école secondaire, humaniora/humanités
- Bolivia: educación primaria superior (grades 6–8) and educación secundaria, (grades 9–12)
- Bosnia and Herzegovina: srednja škola (literally middle school), gimnazija (gymnasium)
- Brazil: ensino médio (officially), segundo grau (formerly)
- Brunei: mostly sekolah menengah (English translation: secondary school), a few maktab (English translation: college)
- Bulgaria: cредно образование (grades 8–12)
- Canada: high school, junior high or middle school, secondary school, école secondaire, collegiate institute, polyvalente
- Chile: enseñanza media
- China: zhong xue (中学; literally, middle school), consisting of chu zhong (初中; 初级中学; literally low-level middle school) from grades 7–9 and gao zhong (高中; 高级中学; literally high-level middle school) from grades 10–12
- Colombia: bachillerato, segunda enseñanza (literally second learning)
- Croatia: srednja škola (literally middle school), gimnazija (gymnasium)
- Cyprus: Γυμνάσιο (gymnasium), Ενιαίο Λύκειο (lyceum)
- Czech Republic: střední škola (literally middle school), gymnázium (gymnasium), střední odborné učiliště
- Denmark: gymnasium
- Dominican Republic: nivel medio, bachillerato
- Egypt: Thanawya Amma (ثانوية عامة), (public secondary certificate)
- Estonia: upper secondary school, gymnasium, lyceum
- Fiji: high school, college
- Finland: lukio (Finnish) gymnasium (Swedish)
- France: collège (junior), lycée (senior)
- Germany: Gymnasium, Gesamtschule, Realschule, Hauptschule, Fachoberschule
- Greece: Γυμνάσιο (three years) (gymnasium), Γενικό Λύκειο (three years) (–1996, 2006–present), Ενιαίο Λύκειο (three years), (1997–2006) (lyceum)
- Hong Kong: secondary school (中學 zung1 hok6)
- Hungary: gimnázium (grammar school), középiskola (comprehensive school, literally middle school), szakközépiskola (vocational secondary school, literally professional middle school)
- Iceland: framhaldsskóli (menntaskóli, iðnskóli, fjölbrautaskóli) from grades 11–13. After elementary school (grades 1–10), students have the option of entering a framhaldsskóli (literally continuation school), which will take at least three years.
- India: secondary school or high school (grades 8–10), higher secondary school or senior secondary school or intermediate college or pre-university college (grades 11–12). It is known by various names in various Indian languages as follows:
  - Hindi (हिन्दी): माध्यमिक विद्यालय (Madhyamik Vidyalaya)
  - Bengali (বাংলা): মাধ্যমিক বিদ্যালয় (Madhyamik Vidyalaya)
  - Tamil (தமிழ்): மேல்நிலைப்பள்ளி (Melnilai Palli)
  - Telugu (తెలుగు): ద్వితీయోత్సాహ పాఠశాల (Dvitiya Vidyalaya) or ఉన్నత పాఠశాల (Unnata Patashala)
  - Marathi (मराठी): माध्यमिक शाळा (Madhyamik Shala)
  - Gujarati (ગુજરાતી): માધ્યમિક શાળા (Madhyamik Shala)
  - Kannada (ಕನ್ನಡ): ಪ್ರೌಢ ಶಾಲೆ (Prouḍha Shale)
  - Malayalam (മലയാളം): ഉപരി വിദ്യാലയം (Upari Vidyalayam) or ഹൈസ്കൂൾ (high school)
  - Punjabi (ਪੰਜਾਬੀ): ਮਾਧਿਮਕ ਵਿਦਿਆਲਿਆ (Madhyamik Vidyalaya)
  - Urdu (اردو): ثانوی اسکول (Sanooy school)
  - Odia (ଓଡ଼ିଆ): ମାଧ୍ୟମିକ ବିଦ୍ୟାଳୟ (Madhyamika Bidyalaya)
- Indonesia: sekolah menengah atas (SMA) (literally upper middle school), sekolah menengah pertama (SMP) (literally first middle school), sekolah menengah kejuruan (SMK) (vocational school, literally middle vocational school)
- Ireland: Meánscoil or secondary school
- Iraq: Madrasa I'dadia (مدرسة اعدادية), (preparatory school)
- Iran: Madrese Rahnamaie (مدرسه راهنمایی), (public secondary certificate)
- Israel: Bet Sefer Tichon (בית ספר תיכון) (literally middle school, but for grades 9-12)
- Italy: scuola secondaria di primo grado (three years) + scuola secondaria di secondo grado (five years): liceo, istituto tecnico, and istituto professionale
- Jamaica: high school (public school 7–13), college (grand-aided schools 7–13)
- Japan: chūgakkō (中学校; literally middle school), kōtōgakkō (高等学校; literally high school), chūtōkyōikugakkō (中等教育学校; secondary school) – In the pre-Meiji educational system, the equivalent was called "chūsei"
- Kazakhstan: орта білім беру мектебі (general secondary school), гимназия (gymnasium), лицей (lyceum), мамандандырылған мектеп (specialized school); basic secondary (grades 5–9) and upper secondary (grades 10–11)
- Latvia: vidusskola (literally middle school)
- Liechtenstein: gymnasium
- Lithuania: vidurinė mokykla (literally middle school), gimnazija (gymnasium), licėjus (lyceum)
- Macau: escola secundária (中學 zung1 hok6): schools with secondary sections have ensino secundário (中學教育 zung1 hok6 gaau3 juk6)
- Malaysia: secondary school or sekolah menengah, sometimes high school is used
- Malta: skola sekondarja or secondary school
- Mexico: educación secundaria y preparatoria
- Mongolia: бүрэн дунд сургууль
- Morocco: In Arabic: junior: Madrasa I'dadia Ta'hilia (مدرسة إعدادية تأهيلية / preparative qualificative school); senior: Madrasa I'dadia Thanawia (مدرسة إعدادية ثانوية / preparative secondary school) – in French: lycée
- Netherlands: middelbare school or voortgezet onderwijs
- New Zealand: high school, college, or secondary school
- Nigeria: secondary school, junior or senior secondary school
- Norway: videregående skole
- Pakistan: secondary school, higher secondary school
- Paraguay: educación media
- Peru: educación secundaria or escuela secundaria
- Philippines: mataas na paaralan, can be divided into junior high school (grades 7–10) and senior high school (grades 11–12)
- Poland:
  - generally: szkoła średnia or szkoła ponadpodstawowa (szkoła ponadgimnazjalna during the existence of gimnazjum middle schools)
  - specifically: liceum ogólnokształcące (comprehensive secondary school, grades 9–12), technikum (technical secondary school, grades 9-13)
- Portugal: 2º ciclo do ensino básico (grades 5–6), 3º ciclo do ensino básico (grades 7–9), and ensino secundário or liceu (grades 10–12)
- Romania: gimnaziu (grades 5–8), liceu (grades 9–12)
- Russia: средняя школа (literally middle school); junior middle school (compulsory, grades 5–9), senior middle school (voluntary, grades 10–11)
- Serbia: gymnasium (four years), professional schools (four years), vocational schools (three or four years)
- Slovakia : gymnázium (i.e. gymnasium, also translated as grammar school or high school)
- Slovenia: gimnazija (gymnasium), srednja šola (literally middle school)
- South Africa: high school or hoërskool
- South Korea: 중고등학교 (中高等學校・chung'godŭnghakkyo), 중등교육 (chungdŭng'gyoyuk; literally middle education), comprising 중학교 (chunghakkyo; the lower secondary school, grades 7–9, referred to as "middle school grades 1–3") and 고등학교 (kodŭnghakkyo; the upper secondary school, grades 10–12, referred to as "high school grades 1–3")
- Spain: educación secundaria, composed of two cycles: E.S.O. (Educación Secundaria Obligatoria, compulsory secondary education, four years, 7th to 10th grade) and bachillerato (non-compulsory secondary education, to years, 11th and 12th grade); formerly (for those born until 31 December 1983), primary education comprised up to the 8th grade and the secondary education was composed of two non-compulsory cycles: B.U.P. (Bachillerato Unificado Polivalente, three years, 9th to 11th grade) and C.O.U. (Curso de Orientación Universitaria, one year, 12th grade)
- Sri Lanka: junior secondary school, senior secondary school
- Sweden: gymnasium
- Switzerland: gymnasium, secondary school, collège or lycée
- Taiwan: junior high school (國民中學), senior high school (高級中學), vocational high school (高級職業中學), military school (軍校), and complete high school (完全中學)
- Thailand: matthayommasueksa (มัธยมศึกษา; literally secondary education)
- Trinidad and Tobago: secondary school, forms 1–5 (five years) or forms 1–6 (seven years)
- Turkey: lise
- Ukraine: gymnasium (compulsory, grades 5–9), lyceum (voluntary, grades 10–12)
- United Kingdom
  - England and Wales: secondary school (may be referred to as high school)
  - Northern Ireland: secondary school or grammar school
  - Scotland: high school or academy
- United States: high school (usually grades 9–12 but sometimes 10–12, also called senior high school), is always considered secondary education; junior high school or intermediate school or middle school (grades 6–8, 7–8, 6–9, 7–9, or other variations) are sometimes considered secondary education.
- Uruguay: liceo or secundaria (three years of compulsory education: ciclo básico; and three years of specialization: bachillerato diversificado, into: humanities (law or economics), biology (medicine or agronomy), science (engineering or rrchitecture), and art
- Venezuela: bachillerato
- Vietnam: trung học cơ sở (abbreviated THCS, literally basic middle school, equivalent to junior high school in the U.S.); trung học phổ thông (abbreviated THPT, literally general middle school, equivalent to senior high school in the U.S.)
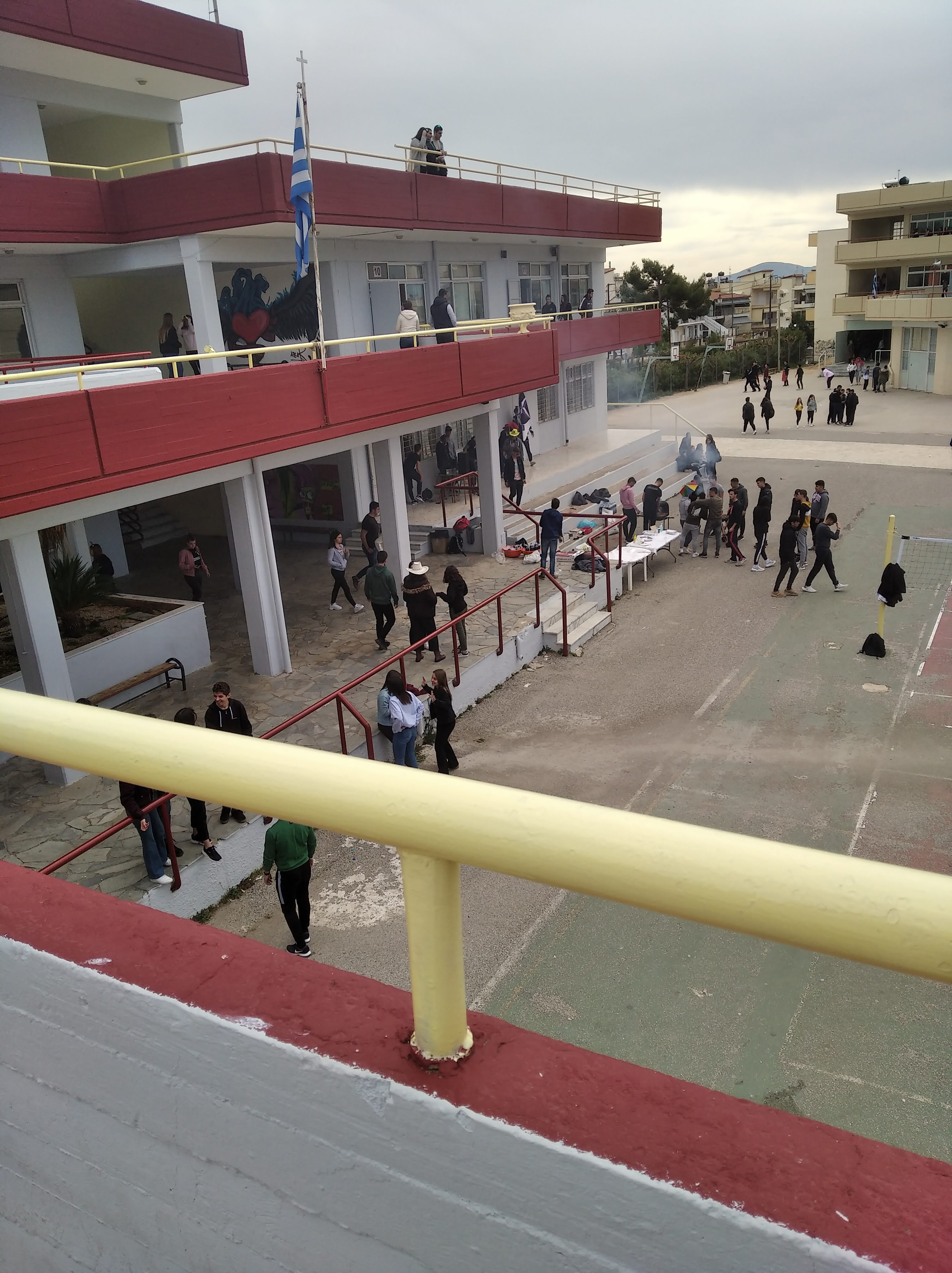
Students at First High School in Argos, Peloponnese, Greece

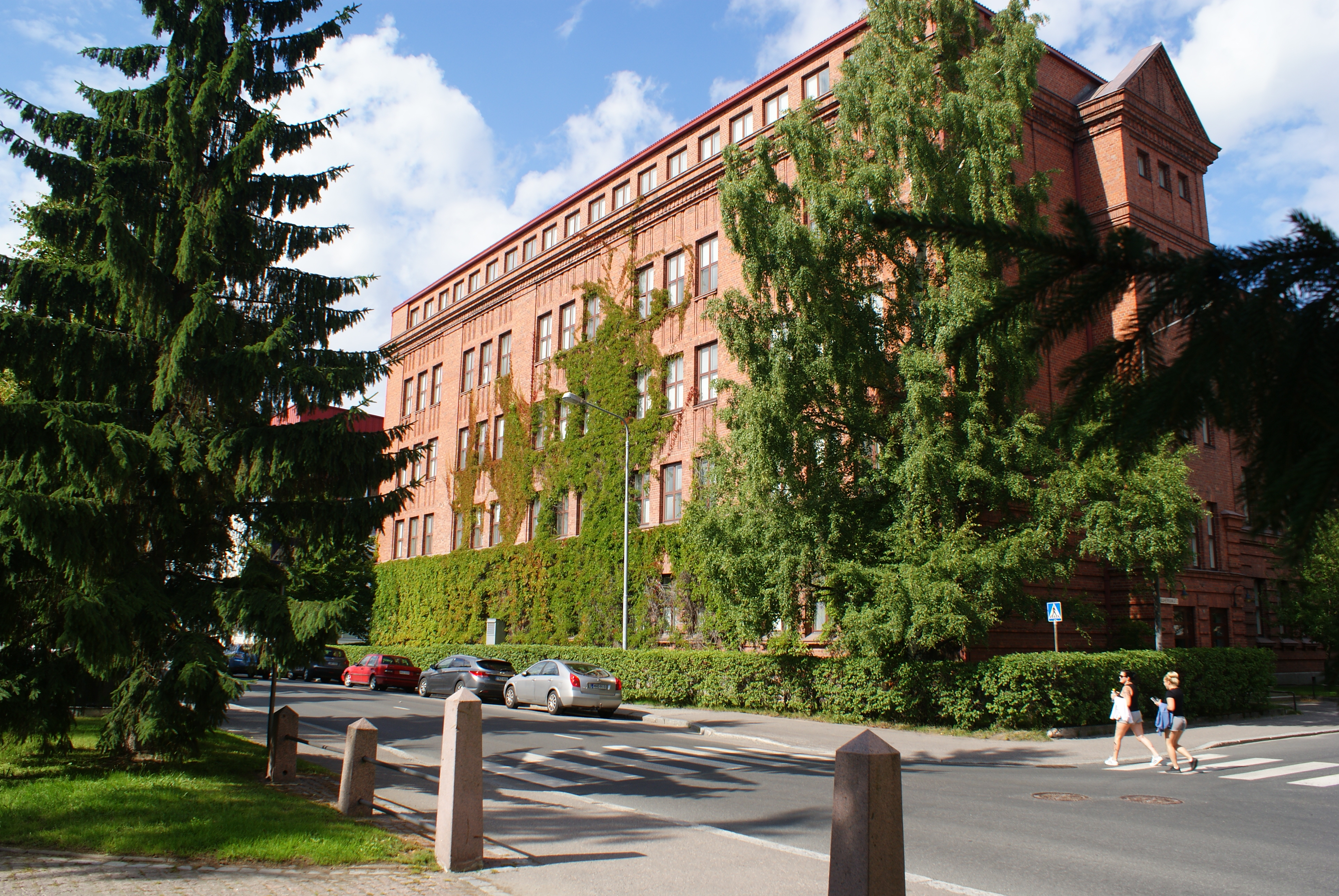
The red-brick building of the Kallavesi High School in Kuopio, Finland

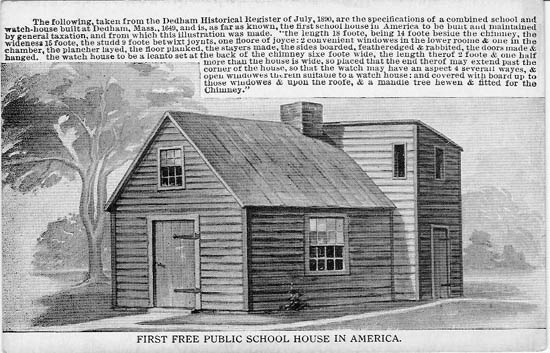
The first taxpayer-funded public school in the United States was in Dedham, Massachusetts

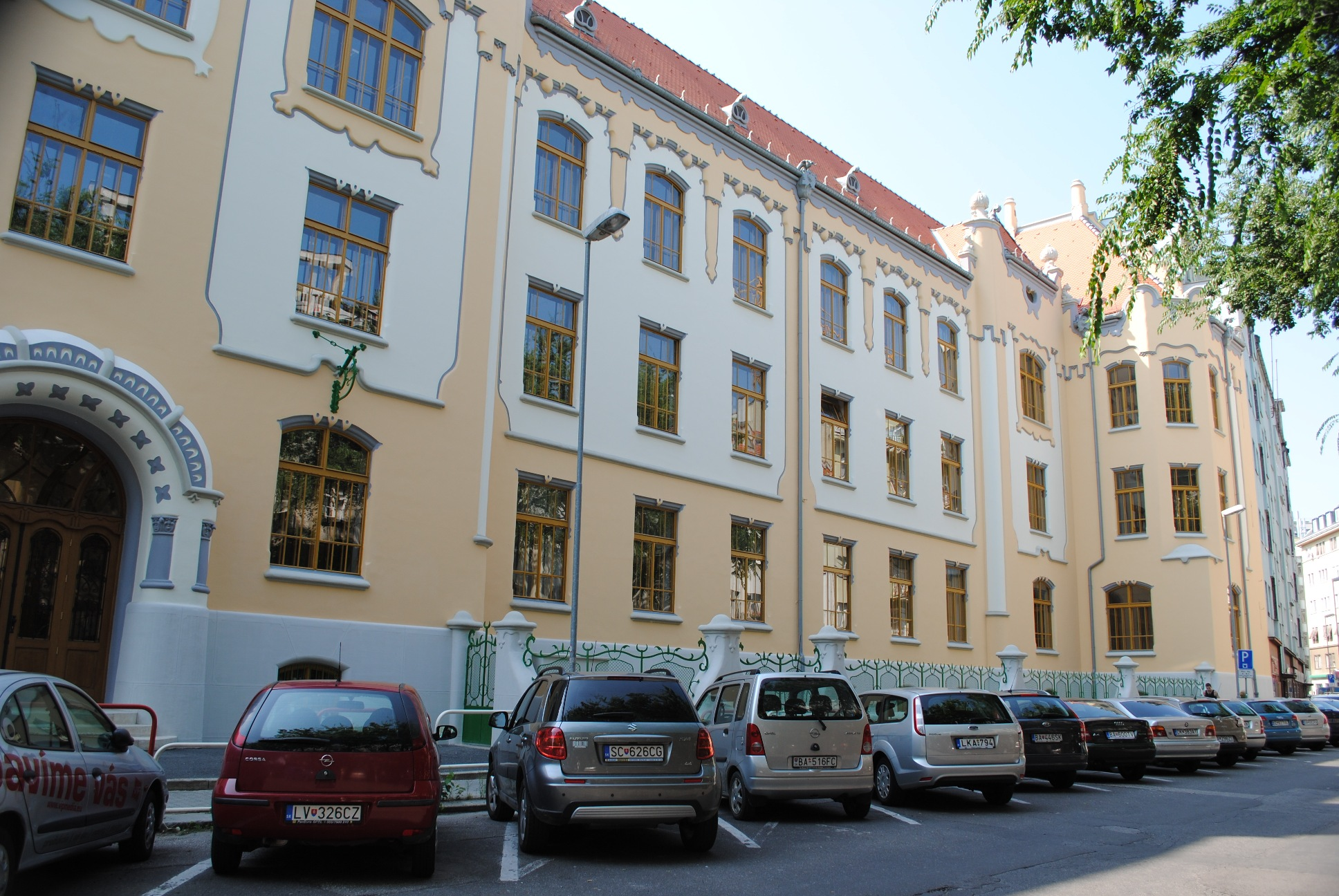
Pozsonyi Királyi Katolikus Gimnázium, a high school in Bratislava, Slovakia

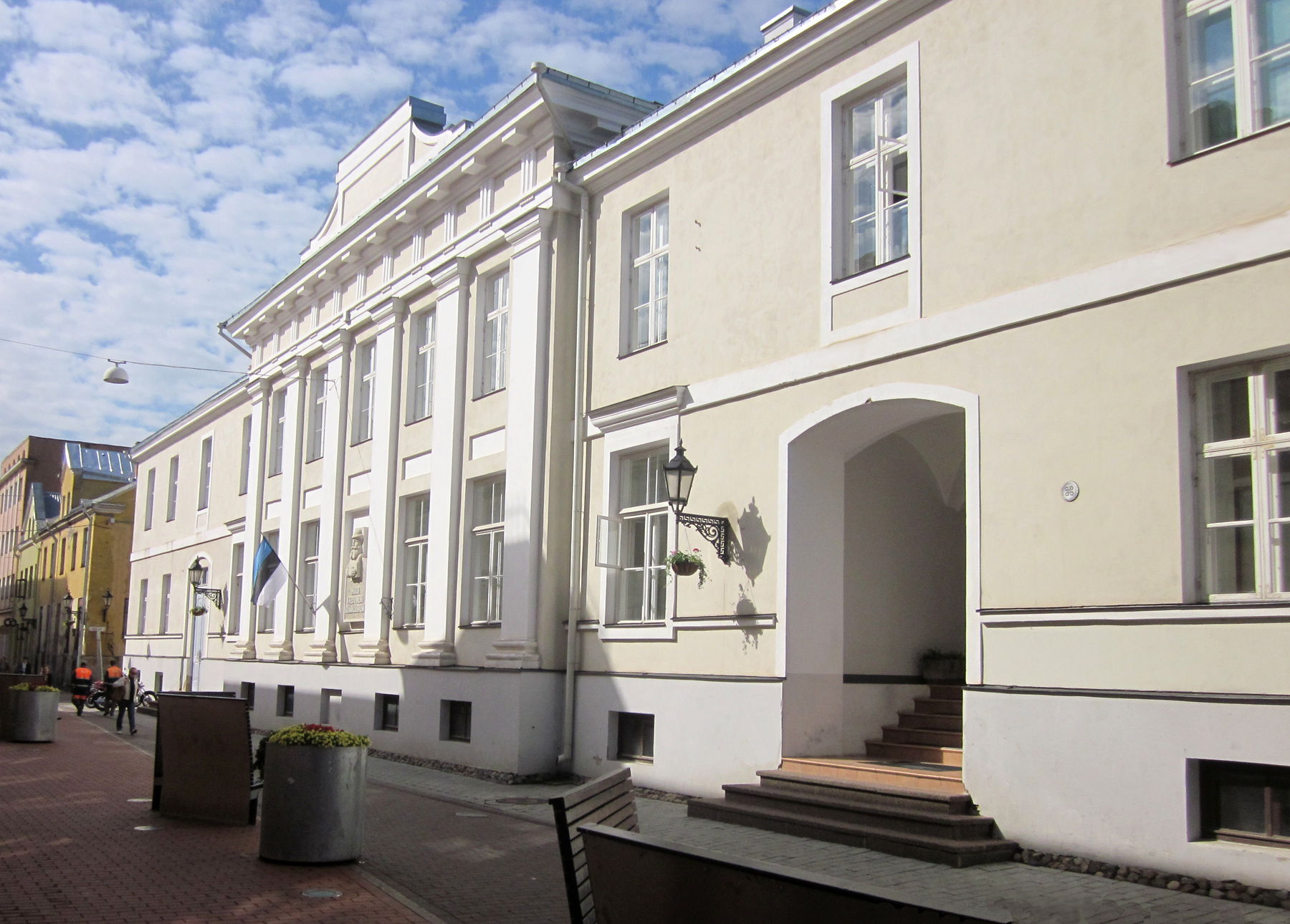
Hugo Treffner Gymnasium in Tartu, Estonia

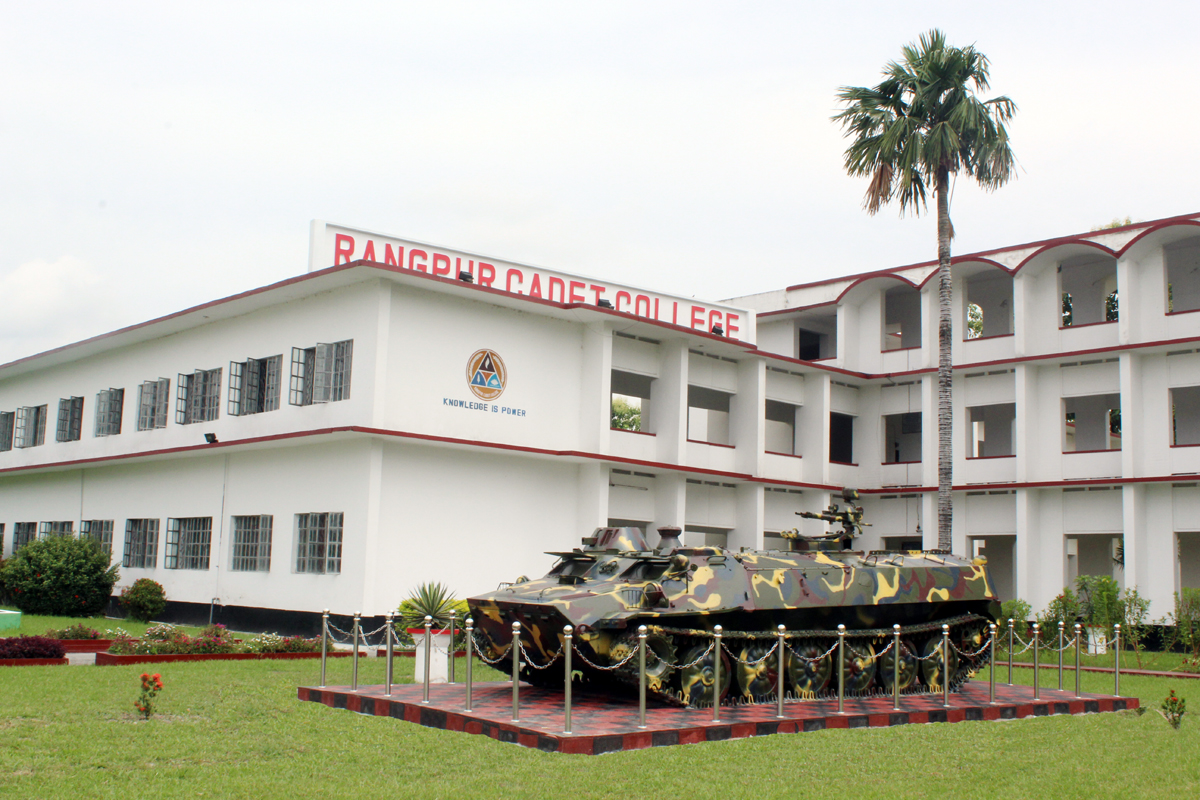
Rangpur Cadet College is one of the Cadet colleges in Bangladesh

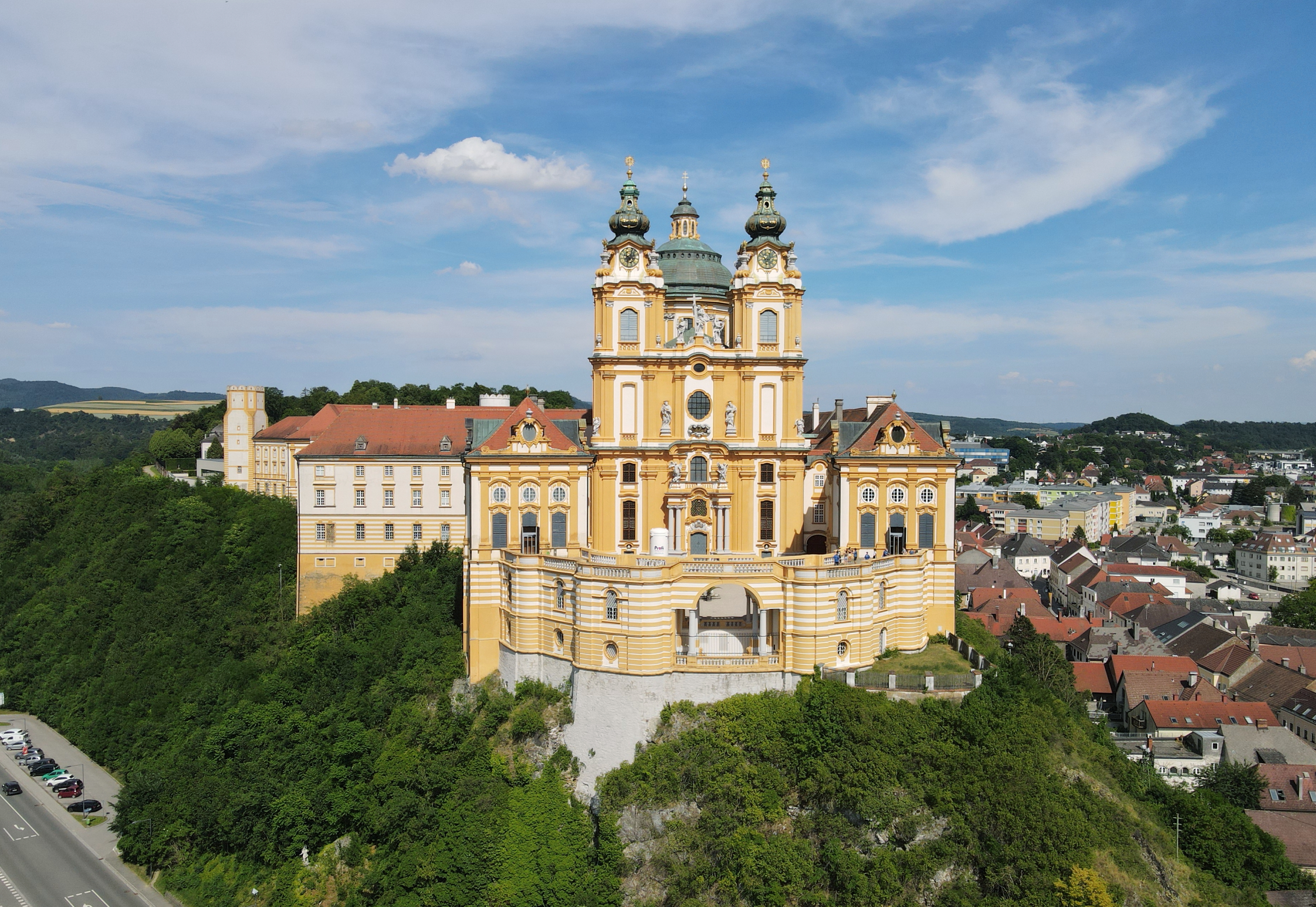
Stiftsgymnasium Melk, a Roman Catholic Benedictine-run gymnasium located in Melk, Austria

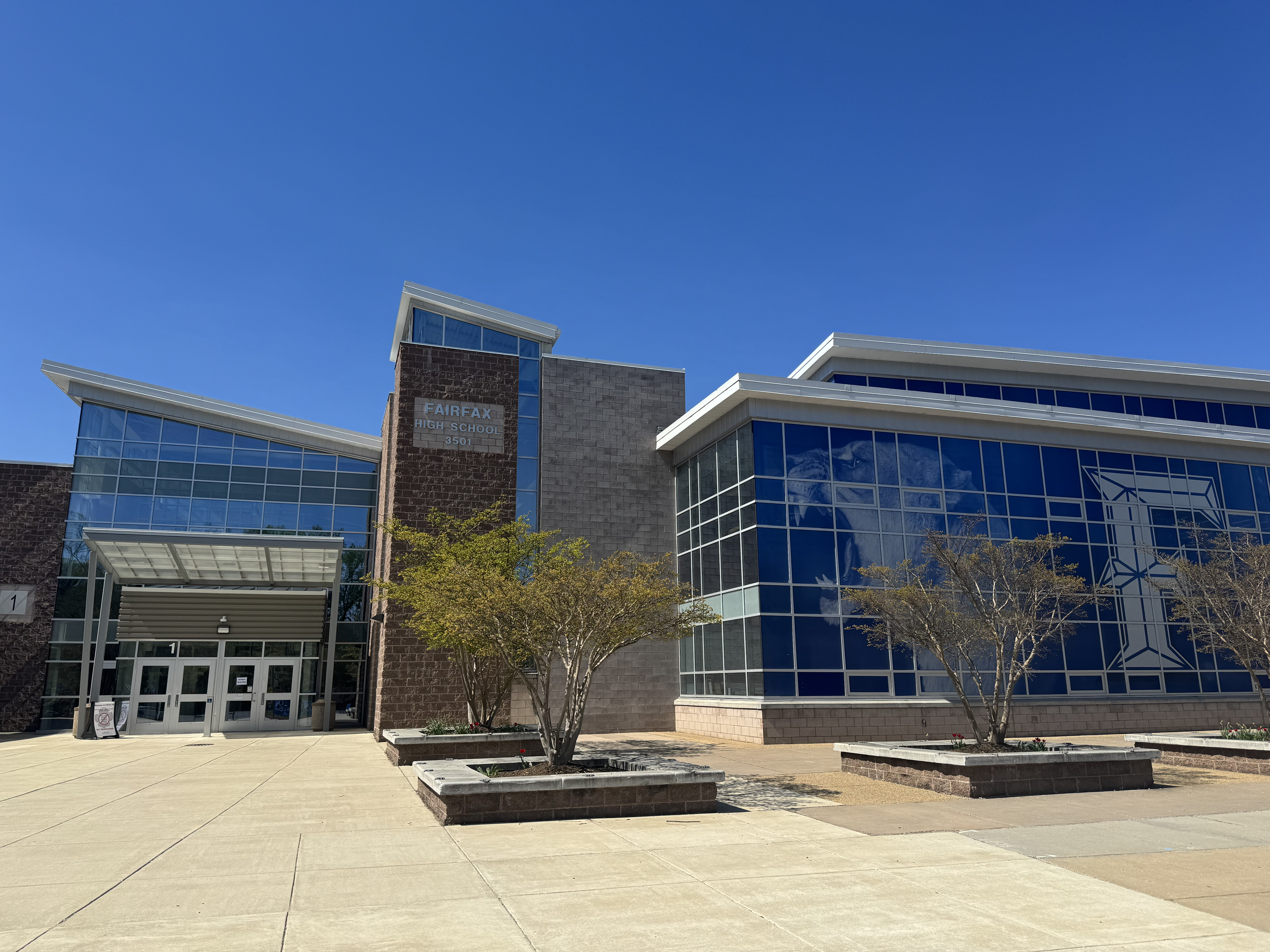
Fairfax High School in Fairfax, Virginia, United States

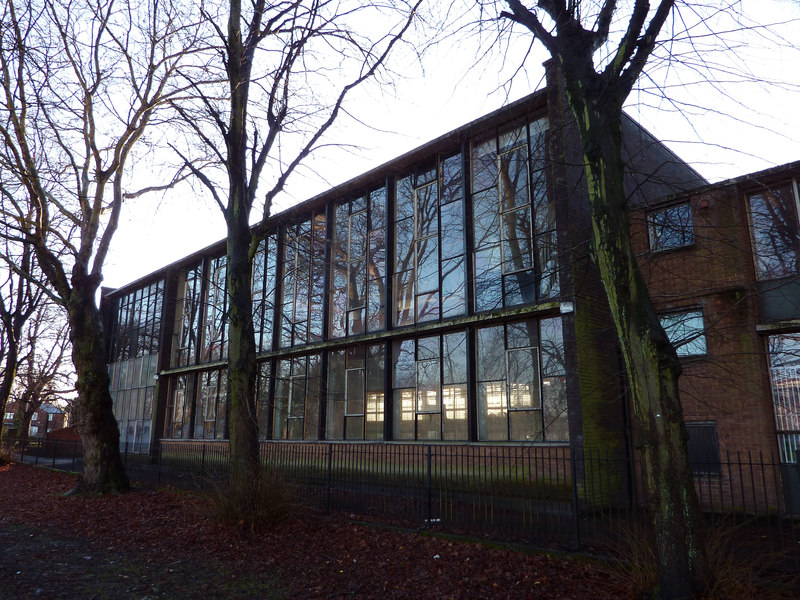
Chorlton Park Secondary School in Manchester, England

== See also ==
- Kindergarten
- Lists of schools by country
- Secondary education
- Tertiary education
- Tech ed
