= Kurt Rosenkranz =

Austrian adult educator (1927–2024)

Kurt Rosenkranz (2 August 1927 – 13 March 2024) was an Austrian adult educator.

== Biography ==
Kurt Rosenkranz was born in Vienna. He grew up in the Viennese district of Brigittenau. His Jewish parents and grandparents had emigrated from Eastern Europe to Vienna. At the age of 9 he became a member of the boys' choir at the temple (de) in Kaschlgasse.

In the year 1938, in the course of the “Anschluss” Rosenkranz experienced riots and humiliation. He was transferred from his old school to a “Sammelschule” for Jews in Währingerstraße 43. The Rosenkranz family fled to Riga, but when the German troops arrived there, the members of the Rosenkranz family were transferred to Soviet camps and interned first at Novosibirsk in Russia, then in Karaganda in Kazakhstan.

In 1946 Kurt Rosenkranz returned to Vienna to work with his father in their small shoe factory.

In 1989 he founded the Jewish Institute for Adult Education.

Rosenkranz earned the title “Professor” for his merits. His brother Herbert Rosenkranz worked as a historian at Yad Vashem.

He died on 13 March 2024, at the age of 96.

== Writings ==
- Together with David Zelinger (ed.): Verpflichtung eines Überlebenden – Reden und Berichte. Bohmann, Vienna 1993

== Literature ==
- "Encyclopaedia of Austrian Authors of Jewish Descent. 18th to 20th Century"; Ed.: Austrian National Library, Vienna. K.G. Saur, Munich 2002, ISBN 3-598-11545-8 (Volume 2)
- Christian H. Stifter, Brigitte Ungar-Klein (ed.): Bildung gegen Vorurteile, Festschrift aus Anlass des 10jährigen Jubiläums des Jüdischen Instituts für Erwachsenenbildung, Wien 2000
