= Brigittenau =

Coordinates: 48°14′12″N 16°22′10″E

Brigittenau Brigittenau (Bavarian)
- 20th District of Vienna
- Coat of arms

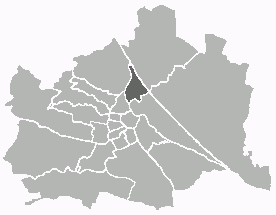
- Location of the district within Vienna
- Country: Austria
- City: Vienna

Government
  - District Director: Hannes Derfler (SPÖ)
  - First Deputy: Herwig Pirker (SPÖ)
  - Second Deputy: Herbert Grausam (FPÖ)
  - Representation (52 Members): SPÖ 24, FPÖ 11, Green 10, NEOS (Austria) 4, KPÖ 4, ÖVP 3

Area
  - Total: 5.68 km^{2} (2.19 sq mi)

Population (2016-01-01)
  - Total: 85,796
  - Density: 15,100/km^{2} (39,100/sq mi)
- Postal code: A-1200
- Address of District Office: Brigittaplatz 10; A-1200 Wien
- Website: www.wien.gv.at/brigittenau/

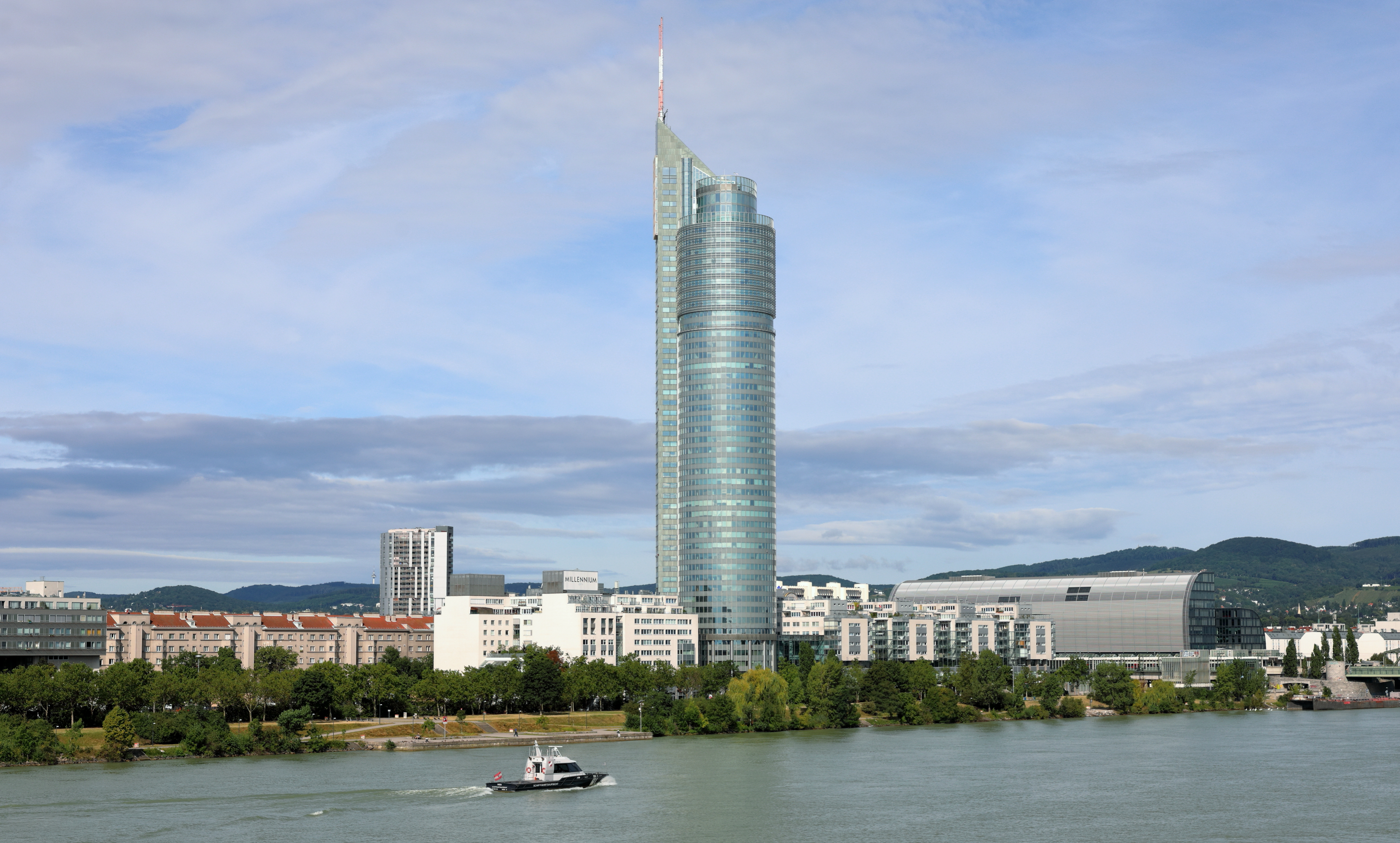
Millennium Tower, long Vienna's tallest skyscraper

Brigittenau (German: [bʁiˌɡɪtəˈnaʊ]) is the 20th district of Vienna (German: 20. Bezirk, Brigittenau). It is located north of the central districts, north of Leopoldstadt on the same island area between the Danube and the Danube Canal. Brigittenau is a heavily populated urban area with many residential buildings.

The district's name comes from the Brigitta Chapel, built between 1645 and 1651.

It consists of a good tract of land secured by the regulation of the Danube 1870–75, and many of the major streets are named after members of the Danube Regulation Commission. Therefore, it does not contain any distinctive historical areas. Brigittenau was separated from the 2nd district in 1900. Earlier component districts were named Schottenau, Wolfsau, Taborau, and Zwischenbrücken.

The best-known landmark is the Millennium Tower. The district also includes Adolf Hitler's former residence in Vienna, the Meldemannstraße dormitory.

== Geography ==
=== Location ===
The Brigittenau district is located on the north end of an old, wide island between the Danube Canal and the Danube in the northeast of Vienna's city center. Located northwest of the narrow Donauinsel ("Danube Island"), on the northeast side of the Danube. The average height of the district area is 162.4 m above sea level. The area was originally called "Unterer Werd" (Werd = island in a stream, i.e., lower island in the stream). Through the regulation of the Danube, the character of the district area significantly changed. The floodplain and Donaualtarme stocks gradually disappeared. The Brigittenau district covers an area of 5.67 square kilometers (2.19 sq mi), or 1.4% of the Vienna area. This puts Brigittenau in the lower middle of the Vienna municipal districts. Due to its location, about 21% of the area is on water, the second highest value in Vienna. While green space is below average, the proportion in the traffic areas is among the highest. In the south, the Brigittenau district borders the 2nd district, Leopoldstadt.

=== Geology ===
The Brigittenau district lies on the western edge of the Vienna Basin. The deeper background of the Vienna Basin is the Brigittenau, from flysch rocks. With the demolition of the Vienna Basin, this is a layer on top of Brigittenauer only 200 meters (660 ft) in height; however, in Zwischenbrücken 2,000 meters (6,600 ft) in depth. During the medium Miocene (Badener layer), the pool broke and deposited in power less freshwater sediments (sands and conglomerates). From the East, the sea stored clay marl, sand and algae, whose thickness increases to the east. In the Sarmatian (upper Miocene) by the performance of the oceans a brackish fauna emerged and clay marl was deposited. Also, this layer has increasing thickness from west to east. Today, this layer on the Brigittenauer Spitz lies 10 meters (33 ft) below the surface, at Zwischenbrücken 360 meters (1,180 ft). In the Pannonium, the increasingly silting-up freshwater lake deposited tegel. The territory of Brigittenau is covered with quaternary deposits, the thickness from 10 to 15 meters (33–49 ft). The bottom layers consist mostly of gravel with sand and layers of gravel. In the area between Heiligenstadt bridge, Franz-Josef railway station, Augarten and the freight station, these layers are covered with loam, fine sand and loess-like deposits. The rubble deposits stem from the erosion processes during the ice ages (in the Pleistocene) thad deposited large quantities. In this sections, the Danube cut wide terraces, where Brigittenau is in the "zone of recent meanderings", which forms the postglacial part of the terrace of the Prater. Alternating floods and ongoing relocations of the Danube bed, together with the formation of new rubble banks led to a low thickness of only 10 to 15 meters (33 to 49 ft). Above the rubble deposits are gray and brown floodplain soils.

=== Land use ===
The developed area of Brigittenau comprises 38.7% (Vienna citywide 33.32%) of the district area. The proportion of housing in the developed area amounts to 64.2%, plus 21.2% for operations, and 10.7% dedicated for facilities in the cultural, religious, sports or the public sector. Greenspace in Brigittenau takes in only 7.9%, for which Brigittenau lies in the lower third of the Vienna municipal districts. About 66% of green space is in parks, 22.3% in sport and leisure areas, with the remainder in small gardens and meadows. Due to the large shares of the area for the Danube Canal and Danube, waters take 20.9% of the total district territory. This is the second highest value of a district. The proportion of trafficked area in the district, with 32.9%, is the fourth highest value in Vienna.

Space allocation in 2001
Builtspace			Greenspace						Water	Transport areas
219.17			43						118.26	186.24
Residences	Oper- ations	Public Facilities	Farms	Parks	Forests	Meadows	Small gardens	Rec. areas		
140.65	46.4	23.43	0	28.38	0	3.73	1.31	9.58		

=== Neighboring districts ===
Brigittenau to the west is bordered by the Danube Canal, which separates it from the district of Döbling, in the northwest, and from Alsergrund, in the southwest. The district boundary runs along the right bank, making the surface water of the Danube canal count towards Brigittenau. In the east, the left bank of the Danube River (at Danube Island) is the border with district Floridsdorf. Also here, the water area of the Danube counts toward Brigittenau. Southeast of the Brigittenauer Bridge, take the district boundaries of Brigittenau, Floridsdorf, the Danube, and Leopoldstadt together, with the southern boundary forming the northern border of Leopoldstadt. This border runs across the Danube, and then along the line Innstraße - Dresdner Straße - Nordbahnstraße - Taborstraße - Northwest Bahnstrasse - Rauscherstraße (wall of Augartens) - Wasnergasse (wall of Augartens) and Perinetgasse on the Danube Canal.

=== District parts ===
Brigittenau consists of two formerly separate communities, as the eponymous Brigittenau and Zwischenbrücken. Zwischenbrücken, however, is divided between Leopoldstadt and Brigittenau. The southern part of Zwischenbrücken is now in Leopoldstadt; the eastern part fell victim to the Danube regulation.

Brigittenau received nearly 463.84 hectares (1,146.2 acres) of the 567.67-hectare (1,402.7-acre) municipal district of the like-named Katastralgemeinde. Only the water area of the Danube belongs to three other Katastralgemeinden; the largest part lies in the Floridsdorf district. There are 31 hectares (77 acres) in Donaufeld, 42.83 hectares (105.8 acres) in Floridsdorf and 30 hectares (74 acres) in Schwarzen Lackenau. A further breakdown of the district area is in the census-districts of official statistics, in which the municipality counts are combined. The eight census-districts (Zählbezirke) in Brigittenau are: Kapaunplatz, Zwischenbrücken, Brigittaplatz, Lorenz Müller-Gasse, Wallensteinstraße, Wextraße, Höchstädtplatz und Nordwestbahnhof.

== History ==
The first known settlers of this area were from the House of Babenberg, in the 11th century. In 1096, the area had been extended by Leopold III to the monastery he founded St. Mary Nivenburg (today Klosterneuburg Monastery). The owners often changed because the place was often given away, sold or leased.

In the 13th century, the area was first documented in a chronicle. The Viennese denoted the area as "Werd" (island). The first settlers in this area were fishermen, hunters and lumbermen. Later, also gardeners and farmers settled there.

1463/64: The Schlagbrücke (today's Sweden Bridge, Schwedenbrücke) was built. This was the first permanent bridge over the still unregulated inner-city branch of the Danube.

1529: The first Turkish siege of Vienna - there was heavy fighting in the area of the Danube islands.

1536 to 1540: Building grounds were given away to citizens that lost their homes during the Turkish siege.

1618–1648: Thirty Years War: On 9 April 1645, the Swedish army under Lennart Torstenson won the Wolf's Lair (Wolfsschanze). Imperial troops conquered back the area in a four-day battle. Thus the Brigitta sage came into being, which the current Brigittakapelle remembers.

1670: The first written mention is made of "Brigittenau". The previous names were: "Im Werd", "Schottenau" and "Wolfsau".

1683: Second Turkish siege of Vienna - During heavy fightings in the Wolf's Lair and near the current Friedensbrücke, the Brigittakapelle is destroyed.

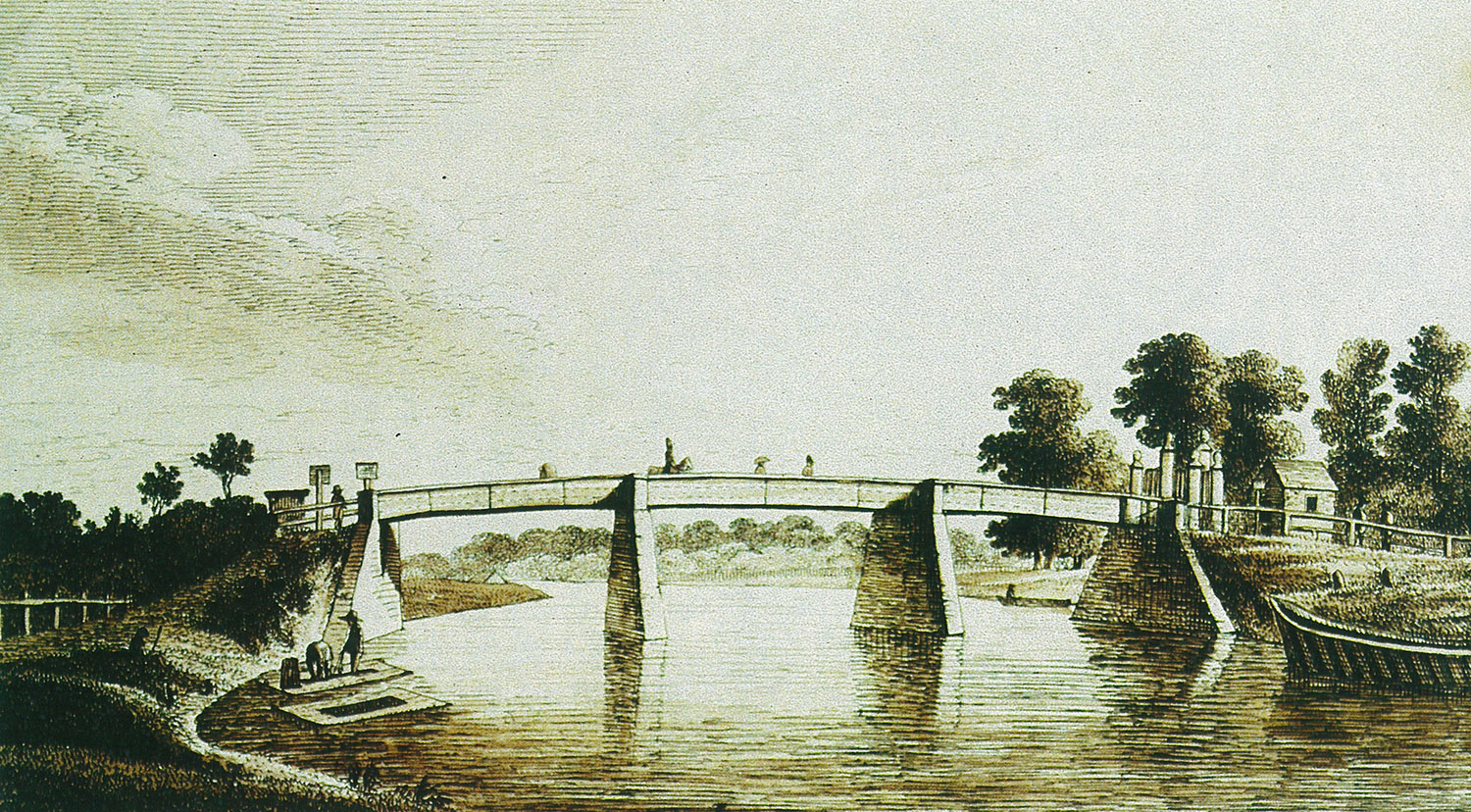
Tabor Bridge (1898)

1688-1698: Tabor bridge is built. A new road passing "Zwischen den Brücken" is created, therefore the Wolfsbrücke bridge is relocated further downstream.

1695: The Brigittakapelle is rebuilt.

1732: A pheasantry is erected by the Hof- und Landjägeramt. 1796: Near the Tabor bridge, the Johann Nepomuk chapel is built.

1810: In Brigittenau, the first hand-craft businesses settles, such as a Kunstblecherei, a steam sawmill and a fire-syringe factory.

1828: The Colosseum, an entertainment facility, is built.

1830: There is a devastating ice floe and a great flood from the Danube.

1834: Construction of the "Universum" (today's Universe Street), another venue.

1838: The Emperor Ferdinand Northern Railway opens, in 1837 as the first steam train of the Empire of Austria (including Hungary at that time) on the leg Floridsdorf - Deutsch-Wagram, one year later crossing the Danube to the North Station at Praterstern.

1840: The first rail-bound train horses drive along what is nowadays the Jägerstraße of old Tabor to the "Colosseum".

1846: Clearing of the remaining riparian forests, erection of nurseries (Vorgartenstraße) in the north of the district.

1848: The Revolutions of 1848 in the Austrian Empire also influence Vienna. Robert Blum, member of the Frankfurt Parliament and born in Cologne travels to Vienna for supporting the democratic movement. After the abolition of the Vienna Uprising, he was executed by the Austrian imperial army in the "Brigittawaldl".

1850: The Brigittenau area, between the Danube Canal and Danube, was incorporated as Leopoldstadt in the city of Vienna. It was the 2nd district of Vienna.

1862: A major flood occurs, the final impetus to the Vienna Danube regulation starting in 1870.

1867: Construction of the Brigittakirche church starts.

1870 Construction on the Danube regulation as well as the construction of the Northwest station at the site of the former "Universums", near the present Tabor.

1871: The Northwest Railway Bridge and the Brigittabrücke (now Peace Bridge) were built.

1873: North rail bridge (Nordbahnbrücke) is built; construction of the Northwest station ended.

1874: Inauguration of Brigittakirche and the Kaiser-Franz-Joseph Bridge over the new stream bed (since 1875 water-bearing) of the Danube (today Floridsdorfer Bridge).

1875: The New Danube bed is ready. Due to the Danube regulation large new areas of land for building have been created.

1883–1884: Construction of the Kaiser Franz Joseph Bridge (now Heiligenstädter Bridge) across the Danube Canal.

1886: Opening of the steam tramway Vienna-Stammersdorf. The route into today's 21st district leads through Jägerstraße, Stromstraße and Marchfeldstraße and over the Kaiser Franz Joseph Bridge.

1897 The first electric tram in Vienna. The "Transversallinie" (today line 5) connects the Vienna head stations of North, Northwest, Franz Joseph and Western Railway. Coming from the 2nd district, it heads along the Augarten (Rauscherstraße) and Wallenstein Street, then on the Brigittabrücke (today's Peace Bridge, Friedensbrücke) into the 9th district. At the junction of the Danube Canal from the Danube's main stream, since 1873 a floating barrier (Schwimmtor) regulated the water inflow if needed. In 1894-98, Otto Wagner instead built the Nussdorf weir and lock.

1899-1900 A synagogue, Brigittenauer Tempel (German), was built on Kluckygasse 11, planned by architect Jakob Gartner (1861-1921). It was destroyed during the pogroms in November 1938.

1900: On 24 March 1900, in the era of mayor Karl Lueger, at the request of Brigittenauer politicians Brigittenau is separated from Leopoldstadt. The council declares Brigittenau to be the 20th Viennese district. This remains until 1904 the highest district number.

1906: The Amtshaus on the Brigittaplatz opens.

1906: On 7 July, Anton Karas is born in the house at Leystraße 46. He becomes famous because in 1948 he played the zither theme for Harry Lime in the film The Third Man.

1907: The service station (in Vienna also known as Remise) in the Wexstraße for the then tram lines 3, 34 and V is opened.

1910: The steam tram to Stammersdorf is replaced by the electric tram (Straßenbahn) line 31.

1912: The reconstruction of Emperor Franz Joseph Bridge, now called Floridsdorfer bridge, started. The bridge was opened not earlier than 1922, after the end of the First World War.

1913: In the hall of the northwest station, Franz Schuhmeier, a social-democratic member of the Imperial Council Reichsratsabgeordnete, is murdered by Paul Kunschak (brother of the Christian social politician Leopold Kunschak).

1914: Establishment of Sascha-Film by Count Sascha Kolowrat-Krakowsky, first producing in Brigittenau, Treustraße 76.

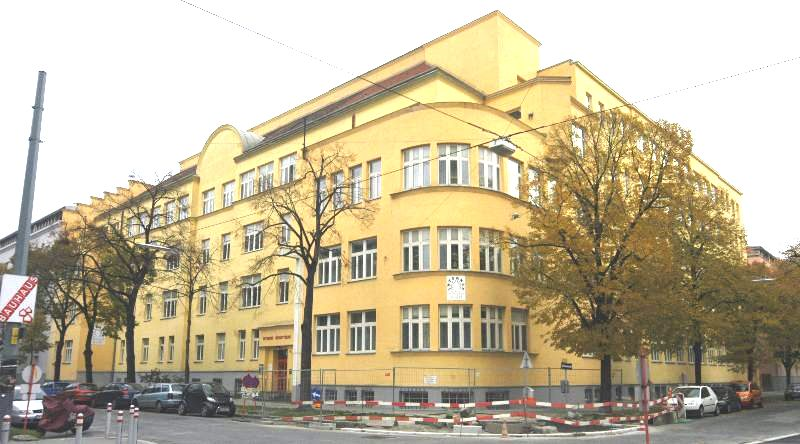
The former Brigittaspital hospital in Brigittenau.

A private association founds a hospital in the 20th Viennese district is at Stromstraße 34, the so-called Brigitta-Spital.

1924: Opening of the community residential complex "Winarsky-Court" (Winarsky-Hof); in its planning in 1921, well-known architects like Adolf Loos and Margarete Schütte-Lihotzky are involved.

1924-1926: Replacement of old Brigittabrücke on the Danube Canal by the new Peace Bridge (Friedensbrücke).

1926: Establishment of the emergency hospital in the Webergasse, under the direction of Dr. Lorenz Böhler.

1929: Huge ice floe on the Danube.

1932: The large municipal residential complex at the Friedrich-Engels-Platz (at Floridsdorfer Bridge) is completed (begun 1930).

1938: Anschluss. Terror against Jewish Viennese, with expulsion and mass murder begins. The school Karajangasse becomes the first concentration camp (Sammellager). In the hall of the northwest station (Nordwestbahnhof), the Nazi exhibition Degenerate Art (NS-Ausstellung Entartete Kunst) takes place.

1943: Construction of flak towers in Augarten (2nd district, just on the border of Brigittenau).

16 July 1944: First American bombing at Vienna causes severe damage to Brigittenau.

April 1945: Heavy bomb damage to Bezirksamt, Brigittakirche, Leyschule and many other buildings, total destruction of the All Saints Church (Allerheiligenkirche). The Floridsdorfer Bridge is blown up by retreating German troops. When conquered, Vienna is divided into four sectors, Brigittenau belonging to the Soviet Union.

1946: On 19 May, the Floridsdorfer Bridge is reopened as Malinowsky Bridge (Malinowskybrücke, in honor of Soviet Marshal Rodion Yakovlevich Malinovsky, the commander of the 2nd Ukrainian Front, who conquered Vienna). Since 1956, the bridge is again called Floridsdorfer Bridge. The Döblinger and the Peace Bridge (Friedensbrücke) are reconstructed.

1952: Removal of the destroyed Northwest station hall.

1962: New Vienna fast-rail with the stop Traisengasse, on the north track through Brigittenau. Later, the stop Handelskai was added.

1964: Opening of the Belt Bridge (Gürtelbrücke) over the Danube canal.

1972: Opening of the new Lorenz-Boehler emergency hospital in Donaueschingenstraße.

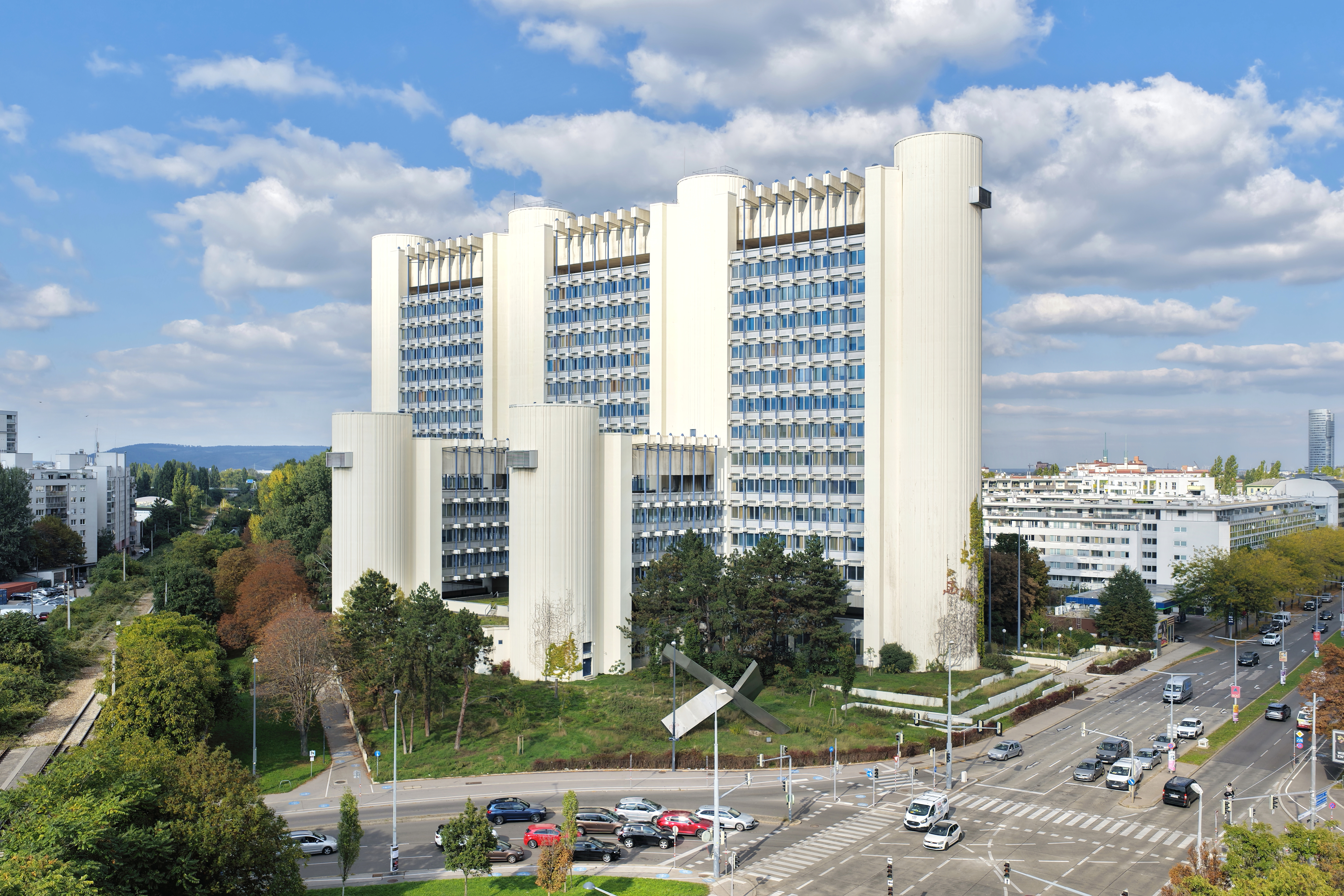
AUVA-Building; opened in 1977

1977: Opening the new building of the Allgemeine Unfallversicherungsanstalt (accident insurance).

1978: Opening of the newly established Floridsdorfer Bridge, next to the old dilapidated one, that is removed afterwards.

1979: Construction of TGM (Technologisches Gewerbemuseum) in the Wexstrasse, a Höhere Technische Lehranstalt.

1982: Opening of the 7th Vienna Danube bridge, the Brigittenauer Bridge, between the bridges Nordbahnbrücke and Reichsbrücke.

1996: Opening of the subway line U6, between the Vienna Beltway by Brigittenau and Floridsdorf. At the edge of the district there are the stations Jägerstraße, Dresdner Street and Handelskai. Also in 1996, the border changed at Döbling, in the field of Nußdorfer lands on the Danube Canal. By this, Brigittenau lost a waterside area west of the Danube Canal to Döbling, and received in return the northern tip of Brigittenau, which formerly belonged to Döbling.

1999: Opening of the Millennium Tower, the second tallest building in Vienna.

== Population ==
Population Growth
Data from Statistik Austria

=== Population development ===
In 1869, the present area comprising Brigittenau, as part of the then Leopoldstadt, had only 15,922 inhabitants. After the completion of the Danube regulation in 1875, the number of inhabitants grew strongly by the addition of new mining areas from the 1880s. In the 1880s and 1890s, Brigittenau was the fastest growing sub-district of Vienna, and in 1910, the district reached a peak of 101,326 residents. After the First World War, the population of Brigittenau gradually, in particular the increased housing demand played a role. Until the '80s, the population and marked 1991, a low of 71,876 district residents. Then the influx of population began to grow again, with the population in early 2007 as 82,121 people. Brigittenau is one of the most densely populated districts of Vienna.

=== Population structure ===
The age structure of the district population in 2005 was slightly younger than the average for Vienna citywide. The number of children under 15 years was 14.9%, slightly higher than the total average for Vienna (14.6%). The proportion of the population from 15 to 59 years was 64.7% (Vienna: 63.4%), above average, while the proportion of people aged 60 or more years, with 20.5% (Vienna: 22.0%) was lower. The gender distribution in the district area, in 2001, was 48.6% men and 51.4% women. The number of married people had a share of 41.0%, compared with citywide 41.2%, slightly below the average of Vienna.

=== Origin and language ===
The proportion of foreign district residents in 2005 was 26.2% for Brigittenau (Vienna citywide: 18.7%). This was the third highest value of a district of Vienna. As in the entire state, the foreign population growth, to 2001, the figure was at 24.1%. The highest proportion of foreigners, in 2005, was represented by approximately 7.0% share of the district population as nationals from Serbia and Montenegro. Another 5.4% were Turkish, Polish 1.6%, or 1.4% each for Bosnian and Croatian citizens. In 2001, a total of 31.0% of the district population was born outside of Austria. Nearly 9.4% expressed as a language Serbian, Turkish 9.3% and 3.3% Croatian.

=== Religious preferences ===
Due to the high proportion of foreigners, Brigittenau with 42.4%, was one of the lowest populations of people with Roman Catholic faith (Vienna citywide: 49.2%). There are four district Roman Catholic parishes, which includes 20 city Deanery. The proportion of people with Islamic faith, at 14.1%, is the second highest value in Vienna. Also, the percentage of Eastern Orthodox believers was 8.4%, much higher than the average. The proportion of Protestant residents stood at 3.1% below the average. Nearly 24.7% of the district population, in 2001, were not included in a religious community. Another 7.4% had no religion or another preference stated.

== Politics ==
District Directors from 1945
Josef Wolf (unbekannt)	4/1945-7/1945
Karl Michael (SPÖ)	1945–1954
Franz Koblizka (SPÖ)	1954–1969
Johann Stroh (SPÖ)	1969–1978
Anton Deistler (SPÖ)	1978–1987
Karl Lacina (SPÖ)	1987–2008
Hannes Derfler (SPÖ)	2008–

The SPÖ has always been the strongest party in Brigittenau. In 1996, the SPÖ's absolute majority was broken by heavy losses to the FPÖ. With 31.1% of the vote, the FPÖ reached their third highest result in Vienna. In the 2001 election, the SPÖ reclaimed the absolute majority, due to a general FPÖ downturn. This downturn continued in 2005, when the FPÖ reached only 16.6% of the vote, a 15% decline since 1996. Brigittenau has however been a battle district between the fronts of FPÖ and SPÖ. The next time things moved was in 2010 when the SPÖ was decreased 8.5% and lost their absolute majority reaching 47.8% now and the FPÖ increased 11.3% up to now 27.9%. The Green Party reached 12.0% of the votes and stagnated. The ÖVP traditionally only plays a small role in Brigittenau and even fall down to 8.5% (the first time in history they were below the 10% in Brigittenau) only being 4th strongest party in the 2010 elections. And the newly founded BZÖ reached 1.0% in the 2010 elections.

== Coat of arms ==
Crest of Brigittenau

The coat of arms for Brigittenau consists of 2 sections. The upper section shows the crest of the earlier, separate community of Brigittenau. It has a silver anchor on a blue background, symbolizing the ship travels on the Danube and Danube Canal. Below that is the symbol for the earlier community of Zwischenbrücken. It shows a red tongue on a silver background, surrounded by a golden halo, with 5 gold stars. The coat of arms symbolizes, at the same time, the holy Johann Nepomuk, the patron of the bridges and also stands for that originally laid zone between the Danube and the Kaiserwasser.

== Culture and sights ==
=== Art ===
- Vindobona

=== Sightseeing ===
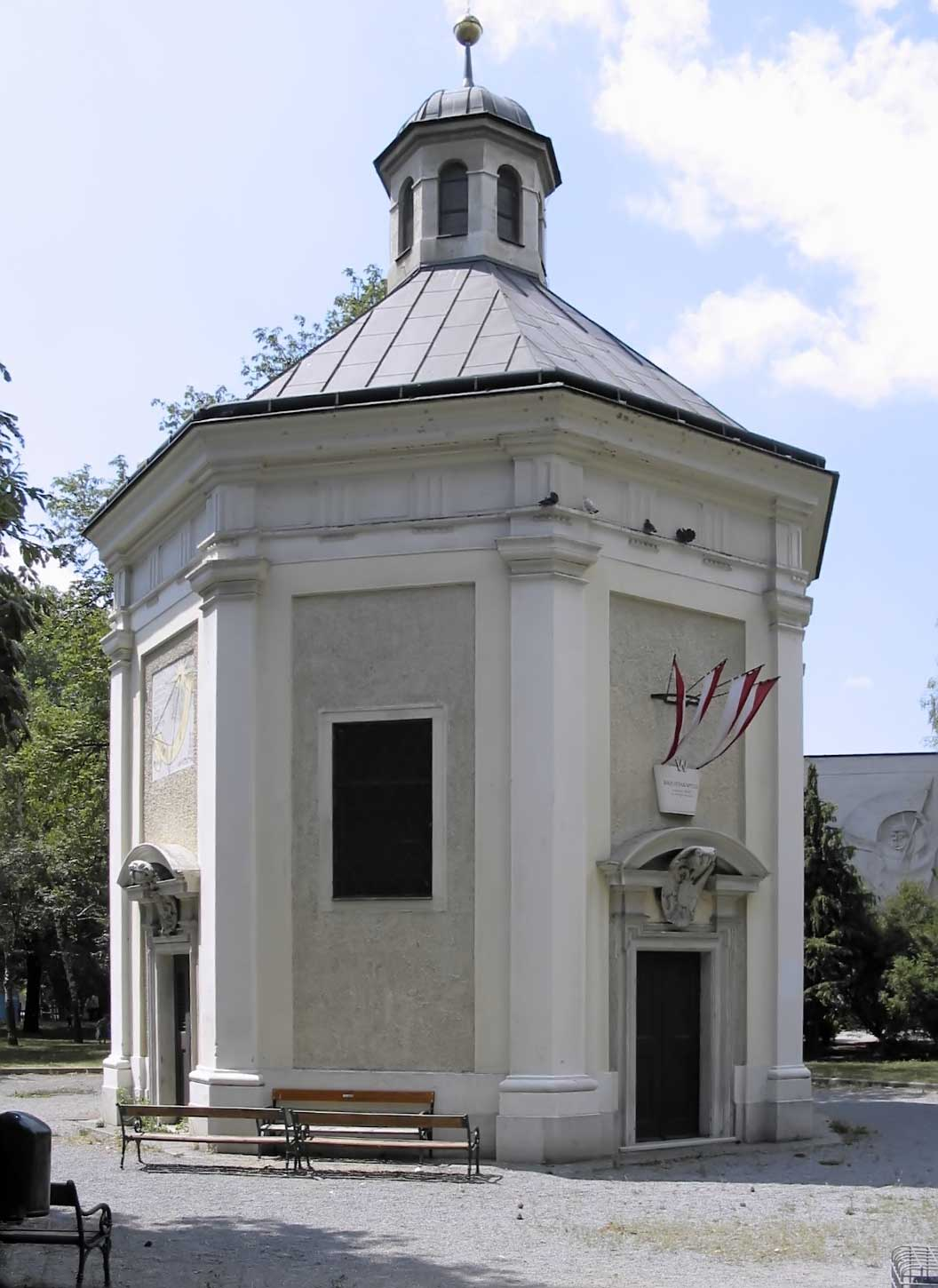
Brigittakapelle (chapel).

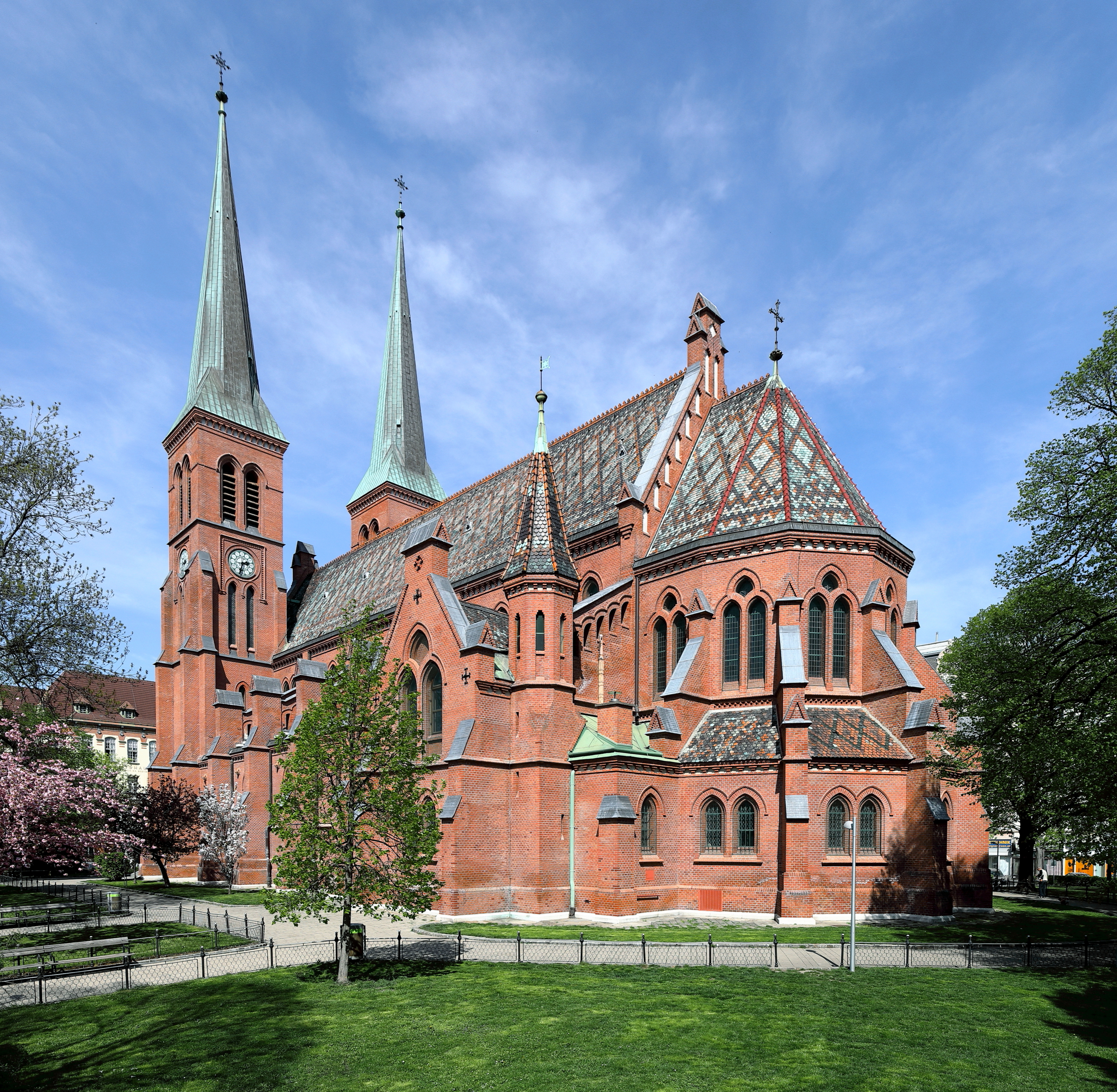
Brigittakirche church

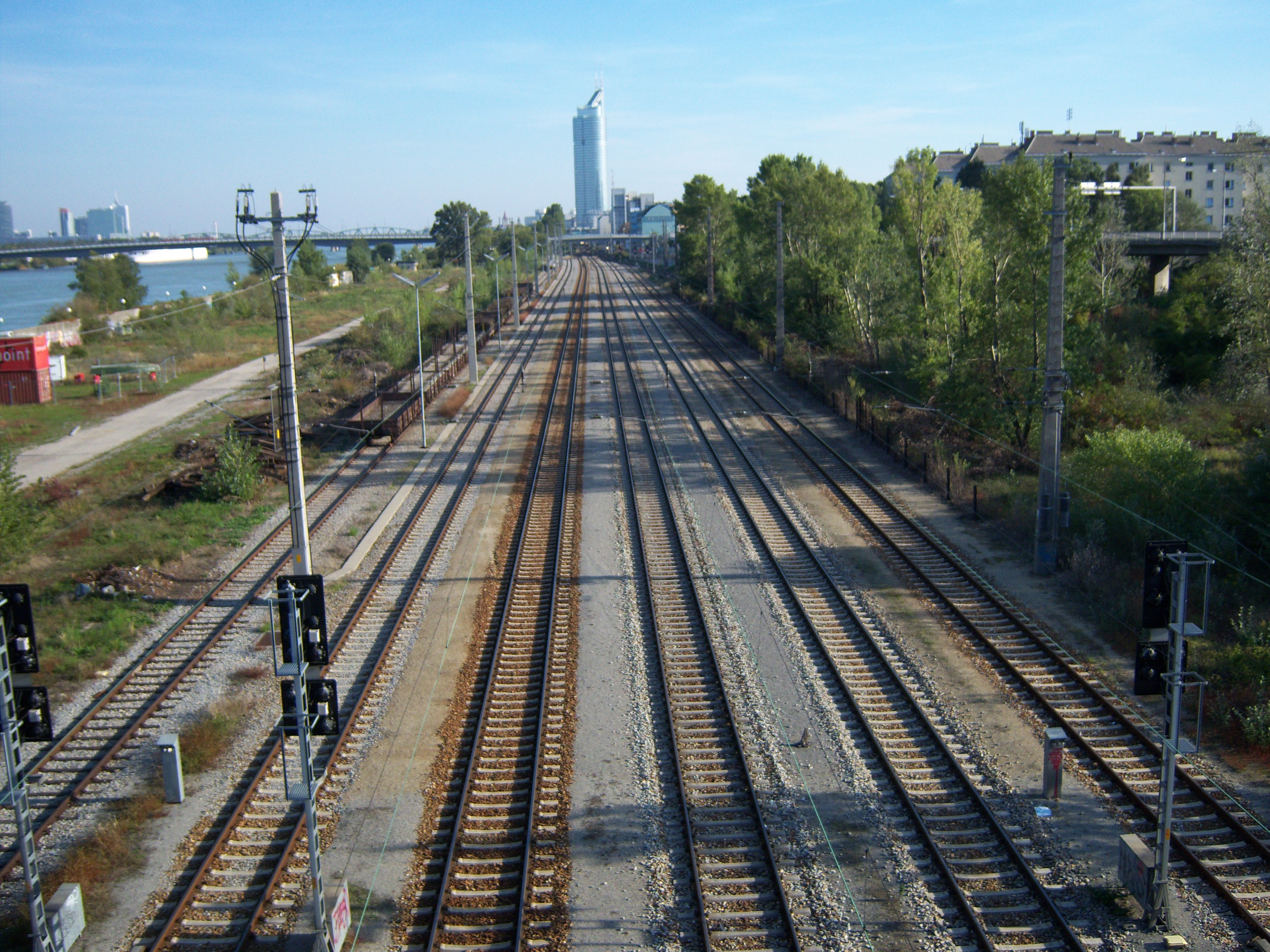
Donauuferbahn

- Allerheiligenkirche - All Saints Church
- Brigittakapelle - Brigitta Chapel
- Brigittakirche - Brigitta Church
- Kirche Zum Göttlichen Erlöser
- Sankt Johann Kapistran-Kirche
- Kirche Muttergottes im Augarten

=== Museum ===
The district controls a single museum. The district museum of Brigittenau dedicates itself the district story that is represented by plans, pictures, views and models. Thereto the story of the Danube, as well as special displays, are presented. Focal points of the museum are, among other things, the history of business and industry, transport and communications, everyday life and society life, and the mathematician Carl Friedrich Gauss.

=== Sports ===
- UAB – Union Aktiv Brigittenau
- WAT Wiener Arbeiter Turnverein – Brigittenau group

== Economy and infrastructure ==
=== Traffic ===
Over 40 percent of the Brigittenau land area is in traffic zones. The green area share amounts to, on the other hand, only about ten percent. Above all the container-terminals Nordwestbahnhof and Knoten Nußdorf are most noticeable, due to the enormous area requirement. The traffic load is very high because the most important traffic arteries that cross the Danube pass through the district. The next bridge over the Danube upstream is 50 km (30 mi) away in Tulln. Moreover, 86 percent of all Brigittenauers employed do not work in the district.

== People ==
- Lorenz Böhler
- Lotte Hass
- Herbert Rosenkranz
- Kurt Rosenkranz

== See also ==
- Allied-administered Austria - the Allied Occupation (1945–55)
