= Höhere Technische Lehranstalt =

School

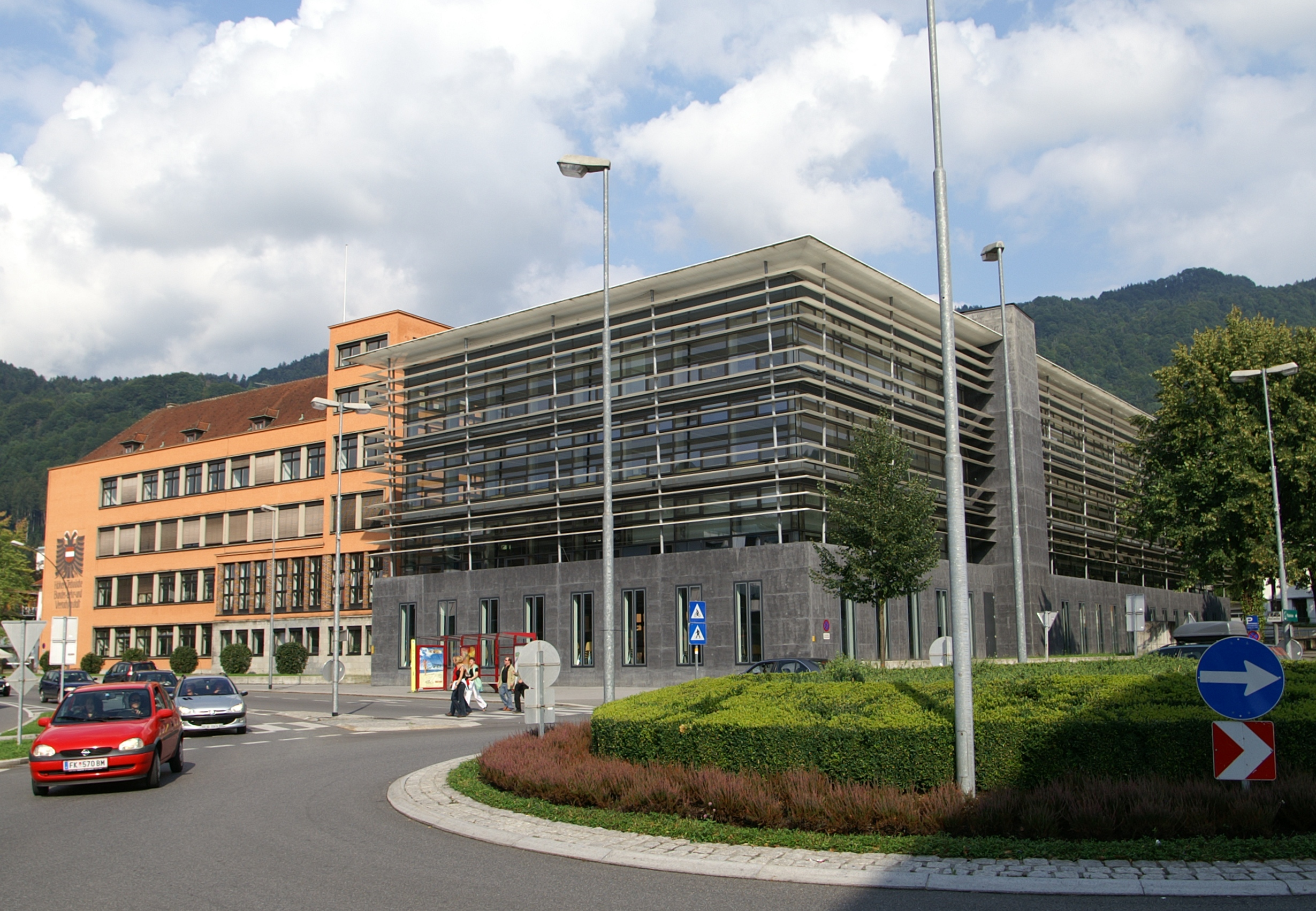
The HTL in Bregenz

A Höhere Technische Lehranstalt (German for Higher Technical Education Institute, or more loosely translated Technical College), commonly known as HTL, is an engineering-focused high school/institution of further education in Austria. As an umbrella term it is used for either

- Höhere Technische Lehranstalt (HTL, HTLA),
- Höhere Technische Bundeslehranstalt (HTBLA, HTBL, Federal Higher Technical Institute), or
- Höhere Technische Bundeslehr- und Versuchsanstalt (HTBLuVA, Federal Higher Technical Institute for Education and Experimentation).

These institutions are an important part of Austrian vocational education. HTLs specialise in disciplines such as civil engineering, electronics, electrical engineering, information technology, informatics, industrial engineering, mechanical engineering, mechatronics and chemistry. There are 75 HTLs in Austria (as of 2016).

HTLs also existed in Switzerland until 1995 when these institutions were converted into Swiss Universities of Applied Sciences.

== Types of courses ==
Höhere Technische Lehranstalten generally offer four different types of courses:

- Höhere Abteilung (ISCED level 5) offers the most common type of courses at Austrian HTLs. The courses last five years and start with grade 9. After five years, students may complete the curriculum with a Diplomarbeit, a final graded project that requires several hundred hours of work. After that, a student has to pass a comprehensive examination: one written test in mathematics, an exam in a main technical subject, at least one in a language (German or English) and the final oral examinations. This is called Reife- und Diplomprüfung since the Austrian Reifeprüfung (Matura) is an integral part of it and graduates are formally enabled to attend university. This type of education has a number of similarities to Japanese colleges of technology (Kōsen). After three years of work experience in engineering, graduates can apply for the Austrian professional title Ingenieur (pre-nominal letters: Ing.), literally engineer, and considered equivalent to a bachelor's degree according to the European Qualifications Framework (ISCED level 6 then).
- Fachschule (ISCED level 3) courses last four years and start with grade 9. After four years, students have to complete a Technikerarbeit (a final examination project) and then pass the final examinations to graduate from HTL. Students can also attend the examinations for the Berufsreifeprüfung, but these examinations are voluntary. The Berufsreifeprüfung formally enables students to attend university.
- The so-called Abendschule (evening school) offers a type of course that is very similar to the Höhere Abteilung and intended for people who want to study while they work. These courses are organized in 8 semesters and are completed with a Reife- und Diplomprüfung just like the Höhere Abteilung.
- The fourth type of courses at HTLs are special post-secondary courses for students who have completed an apprenticeship, are master craftsmen or graduated from Gymnasium with Matura. These types of courses are also offered at the Höhere Abteilungen and end with the same qualifications as the five-year courses.

== HTLs ==
- The largest HTL in Austria with 3.500 students is the HTBLuVA Mödling, which is also the largest school in Europe.
- The oldest Austrian vocational school is the HTBLuVA Wien 5 Spengergasse in Vienna, established in 1758 by Maria Theresia.
- The HTBLVA TGM (Technologisches Gewerbe Museum) in Vienna has the highest school building in Austria (about 70m, 16 floors).
- The HTBLVA TGM also has the largest base area of any HTL in Austria.

== Höhere Technische Lehranstalten in Austria ==
Name	Bundesland	Location	Departments	Students
HTL Eisenstadt	Burgenland	Eisenstadt	Mechanical engineering, Mechatronics, Aerospace engineering technology, Materials engineering; Fachschule mechanical engineering	1000
HTLuVA Pinkafeld	Burgenland	Pinkafeld	Civil engineering, Computing and automation technologies, Computing and organisation, Mechanical engineering, Fachschule for civil und mechanical engineering, Kolleg "Facility Management"	1400
HTL 1 Klagenfurt	Carinthia	Klagenfurt	Mechanical engineering, Mechatronics, Electrical engineering, Fachschule for mechatronics und electrical engineering	1100
HTL Mössingerstraße	Carinthia	Klagenfurt	Telecommunications, Computer engineering, Biomedical technology, Energy technologies and industriell electronics, Information technology, Fachschule for computing und communication technologies	1150
HTBLuVA Villach	Carinthia	Villach	Civil engineering (with subdepartments Hochbau and Tiefbau), Interior design and wood technologies, Informatics / Software Engineering, Cyber Security and Media Technology	1450
HTL Ferlach	Carinthia	Ferlach	Industrial technologies, Industrial design, Weapon technologies	~600
HTL Wolfsberg	Carinthia	Wolfsberg	Information systems, Management, Automation technologies	500
HTL Krems	Lower Austria	Krems	Civil engineering (with subdepartments Hochbau and Tiefbau), Urban planning, Information technology	900
HTBLuVA Waidhofen/Y	Lower Austria	Waidhofen/Ybbs	Automation technologies, Electrical engineering, Engineering management, Fachschule for Electrical engineering with computing and networking technologies, Mechanical engineering	800
HTL St. Pölten / HTBLuVA St. Pölten	Lower Austria	Sankt Pölten	Engineering management, Information Technology, Electronics, Electrical engineering, Mechanical engineering	2200
HTBLuVA Wiener Neustadt	Lower Austria	Wiener Neustadt	Automation technologies, Electrical engineering, Information technology, Civil Engineering (Hochbau), Computing and organisation	1300
HTL Hollabrunn	Lower Austria	Hollabrunn	Electronics, Electrical engineering, Food technologies, Mechanical engineering, Industrial engineering, Information technology	1250
IT-HTL Ybbs	Lower Austria	Ybbs an der Donau	Internet and Media technology, Network technologies	300
HTL Mistelbach	Lower Austria	Mistelbach	Health technology	300
HTBLuVA Mödling	Lower Austria	Mödling	Civil engineering (with subdepartments Hochbau and Tiefbau), Environmental technology, Electronics, Electrical engineering, Automotive engineering, Wood technologies, Interior design, Mechanical engineering, Mechatronics, Engineering management, Industrial engineering	3500
HTL Wieselburg (Josephinum)	Lower Austria	Wieselburg	Agriculture, Agricultural machinery, Food technology	850
HTL1 Bau und Design Linz	Upper Austria	Linz	Civil engineering (with subdepartments Hochbau, Tiefbau and Bauwirtschaft), Construction and communication design, Print and digital media	2100
HTL Linz – Linzer Technikum	Upper Austria	Linz	Mechanical engineering, Mechatronics, Electrical engineering and information technology	1700
HTL Steyr	Upper Austria	Steyr	Automotive engineering, Electronics and computer engineering, Mechatronics, Metal design	1050
HTL Wels	Upper Austria	Wels	Information technology, Electrical engineering, Mechatronics, Mechanical engineering, Chemical engineering	1700
HTL Braunau	Upper Austria	Braunau am Inn	Electronics, Electrical engineering, Mechatronics, Bionics, Computer engineering, Cybersecurity	1000
HTL Ried	Upper Austria	Ried im Innkreis	Mechanical engineering (Lightweight engineering, Agricultural & environmental engineering, Automation technology)	350
HTL Hallstatt	Upper Austria	Hallstatt	Interior design, Wood technology	500
HTL Grieskirchen	Upper Austria	Grieskirchen	Software Engineering / Informatics and Medical Software Engineering / Medical Informatics	450
HTL für Lebensmitteltechnologie	Upper Austria	Wels	Food technology	130
HTBLA Leonding	Upper Austria	Leonding	Computing and organisation, Evening School for Computing and organisation, Electronics, Fachschule for Electronics, Media Technology	1100
HTL Traun	Upper Austria	Traun	Information and communication technology, Fachschule for computing	320
HTL Perg	Upper Austria	Perg	Computing and organisation, Fachschule for computing	350
HTL Neufelden ATN	Upper Austria	Neufelden	Automation technology, Engineering management	400
HTL Vöcklabruck	Upper Austria	Vöcklabruck	Mechanical engineering, Engineering – Environmental technology, Engineering – Facility Management; Engineering management – Information systems, Engineering management – Management	1000
HTL Innsbruck Anichstraße	Tyrol	Innsbruck	Mechanical engineering, Electronics – Computer engineering, Electronics-Telekommunications, Electrical engineering, Information technology, Engineering management	1500
HTL für Bau und Kunst Innsbruck	Tyrol	Innsbruck	Civil engineering (with subdepartments Hochbau and Tiefbau), Kolleg, Art and Design	1000
HTL Fulpmes	Tyrol	Fulpmes	Mechanical engineering, Industrial technology, Materials engineering and product design	200
HTL Jenbach	Tyrol	Jenbach	Mechanical engineering, Engineering management	500
HTL Kramsach	Tyrol	Kramsach	Chemical engineering, focus chemical industrial engineering (since 2013/14)	320
HTL Salzburg	Salzburg	Salzburg Stadt	Civil engineering (with subdepartments Hochbau and Tiefbau), Graphics and Multimedia, Electrical engineering, Mechanical engineering, Electronics, Information Technology	2300
HTL Hallein	Salzburg	Hallein	Management, Information systems, Mechanical engineering, Ecodesign, sculpture design, Civil engineering, Cabinet making, Interior design, carpentry, Stonemasonry	1100
HTL Saalfelden	Salzburg	Saalfelden	Elektrotechnik u. Informationstechnik, Mechatronics, Civil engineering (with subdepartments Hochbau and Tiefbau), Fachschule for computing, communication technology and civil engineering	800
HTBLuVA Graz – Gösting (BULME Graz)	Styria	Graz	Electronics-Computer engineering, Electronics-Telecommunications, Multimedia technology, Electronics-Networking technology, Electrical engineering -Information technology / Project management, Electrical engineering -Information technology / Automation, Mechanical engineering, Engineering management-Information systems, Engineering management-Management/ Sport/ Logistics/	2600
HTBLuVA Graz-Ortweinschule	Styria	Graz	Civil engineering, Art and Design	1550
HTBL-Kapfenberg	Styria	Kapfenberg	Electrical engineering, Mechanical engineering, Materials engineering	1000
HTL Zeltweg	Styria	Zeltweg	Mechanical engineering, Industrial technology; Civil engineering, Engineering management	600
HTBLA Kaindorf	Styria	Kaindorf an der Sulm	Computing and organisation, Mechatronics, Automation	950
HTL Leoben	Styria	Leoben	Materials, Logistics, IT	430
I-HTL Bad Radkersburg	Styria	Bad Radkersburg	Electrical engineering	100
HTBLuVa Voitsberg	Styria	Voitsberg	Mechanical engineering	100
HTL Weiz	Styria	Weiz	Mechanical engineering, Environmental engineering, Engineering management, Electrical engineering, Information technology	1000
HTL Bregenz	Vorarlberg	Bregenz	Mechanical engineering, Electrical engineering, Engineering management, Fachschule for mechanical engineering, Fachschule for electrical engineering	620
HTBLuVA Dornbirn	Vorarlberg	Dornbirn	Clothing technology, Information systems, Textile management, Chemical engineering, Fachschule for computing, Fachschule for clothing, Fachschule for textile chemistry	1200
HTBLuVA Rankweil	Vorarlberg	Rankweil	Electronics, Fachschule for electronics, Civil engineering (with subdepartments Hochbau and Tiefbau), Kolleg for Interior design and wood technology	850
Camillo Sitte Lehranstalt	Vienna	Landstraße	Civil engineering	1200
HTL Wien 3 Rennweg	Vienna	Landstraße	Mechatronics, Information technology, Computing	1000
Schulzentrum Ungargasse, Wien 3	Vienna	Landstraße	Engineering management, Information technology, Fachschule for mechanical engineering, Leather design	1000
HTBLVA Spengergasse	Vienna	Margareten	Medical Informatics, Informatics, Animation/Gamedesign and Interior/Surfacedesign, Business Informatics and Technical Management	2600
HTL Wien 10	Vienna	Favoriten	Electronics, Electrical engineering, Mechanical engineering, Mechatronics, Environmental engineering	1020
HTL Wien West	Vienna	Ottakring	Electronics, Information technology, Mechanical engineering, Electrical engineering, Computing and communication technology	1550
HBLVA für chemische Industrie	Vienna	Hernals	Biochemestry, Chemical-Informatics, Environmental engineering	1000
Technologisches Gewerbe Museum, TGM Wien	Vienna	Brigittenau	Electronics, Electrical engineering, Information technology, Mechanical engineering, Materials engineering, Engineering management, Industrial Engineering	3000
HTL Donaustadt	Vienna	Donaustadt	Information technology, Communication technology, Computing, Fachschule for Electronics	1300

Sorting by Gemeindekennziffer.

== See also ==
- Education in Austria
- List of universities in Austria
