= Education in Austria =

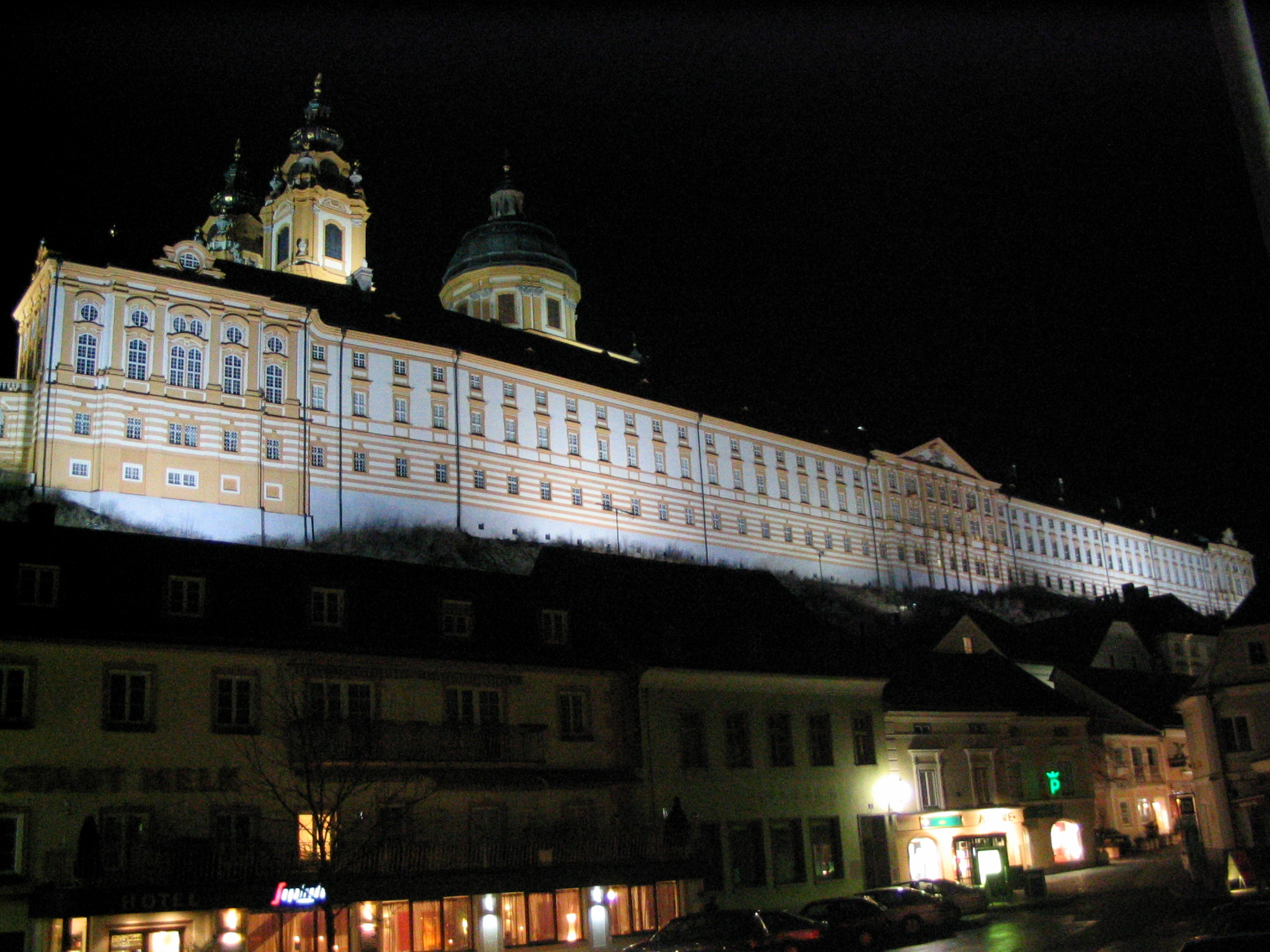
Stiftsgymnasium Melk, oldest Austrian school

Education in Austria is characterized by a free and public school system, with nine years of compulsory education. Beyond this, students can choose from various vocational, technical, and university-preparatory tracks that typically require one to four additional years of study. The legal framework for primary and secondary education is outlined in the School Act of 1962.

The Federal Ministry of Education oversees funding and supervision of primary, secondary, and, since 2000, tertiary education. While education policy is set at the federal level, primary and secondary schools are administered by the respective state authorities.

Federal laws governing education hold significant importance and are treated almost like constitutional laws. They can only be passed or amended by a two-thirds majority in parliament, ensuring stability and continuity in the educational system.

== General education ==
It is mandatory for pupils in Austria to complete nine years of school. After four years in elementary school (Volksschule) and four years in a school for lower secondary education (Mittelschule) or grammar school (Gymnasium), students who want to take up an apprenticeship and do not want to complete a degree need to go to a polytechnic institute (Polytechnische Schule) for a year. After finding an apprentice position they have to attend vocational school (Berufsschule) for three years: this can be done either in block release (5 days a week for about four months) or day release (once a week in the same stretch of time as a normal school). On the days you are at school you don't have to go to work. At the end of those three years, they have to take an exam, the final apprenticeship examination (Lehrabschlussprüfung).

Pupils who want to get a degree have to complete four to five years at an institution of higher education (Höhere Schule) or a vocational school with higher education entrance qualification (Berufsbildende Höhere Schule). Most of these schools require an entrance exam or demand high marks on your last school certificate. The final exam for either one of those higher education institutions is matriculation (Matura). After that, you are free to go to university, though some subjects may require additional exams (e.g. medicine).

Private schools that provide primary, secondary education and some teacher training account for approximately 10% of the 6,800 schools and 120,000 teachers. The most significant provider of private schools in Austria is the Roman Catholic Church.

== History ==
Before 1774, education in Austria was a task of the Catholic Church. Under the rule of the Habsburg Monarchs Maria Theresa and Joseph II, priests took on the role of educators and were eventually considered civil servants under law. Duty of parish priests included the promotion of modern religious views of tolerance, morality and ethics, agriculture, hygiene, medical improvements, civic virtues and obedience to the state. For example, in 1804 priests were obligated to preach about the beneficial effects of vaccinations. In attempts to control the teachings of parish priests, in February 4, 1783, the state banned speaking against the state laws, regulations, and unnecessary doctrinal controversies. Furthermore, sermons should improve the hearts of citizens by sowing and promoting virtue. Despite the teachings of priests having regulations placed by the state, this new role was important in reaching a more diverse ran.

Mandatory primary education was introduced by Empress Maria Theresa of Austria (1740–1780), mandating in 1774 that all children of both sexes from the ages of six to twelve had to attend school. While this attendance policy was not strictly enforced, it established the statewide precedent that all children should attend school. To achieve this, Maria Theresa's regulations required that schools exist in all areas — even rural ones, which were required to have a one- or two-class elementary school (known as a Volksschule). Furthermore, textbooks were unified and teacher education was regulated. While these reforms handed educational authority from the church to the state to some extent, religious and moral education was still a large part of the curriculum; at this time, schools also taught reading, writing, and arithmetic.

Even though schooling became compulsory for both girls and boys for a time period of six years, girls were not allowed to attend professional or secondary schools. The Austrian literacy rate became one of the highest in the Habsburg Empire during the beginning of the 19th century due to this development. The first secondary school for girls was opened in 1868, whilst the first gymnasium for girls was founded in 1892. From 1872 girls were also allowed to graduate, yet remained excluded from universities. Women were admitted to the Philosophical Faculty in 1897. In 1900 they were also admitted to the Faculty of Medicine. In 1919, women were admitted to the Faculty of Law, in 1923 to the Faculty of Protestant Theology, and 1946 to the Faculty of Catholic Theology. In 1910 girls were admitted to boys‘ gymnasiums, but they were neither allowed to participate actively in class nor to take part in exams.

The history of the Austrian education system after World War II may be characterized as an attempt to transform higher education from a traditional entitlement of the upper social classes to more equal access for all social classes. Before the School Act of 1962, Austria had a “two-track” education system. After four years of compulsory primary education from the ages of six to ten in the elementary school, or Volksschule (pl., Volksschulen), children and their parents had to choose between the compulsory secondary level for eleven- to fourteen-year-olds called the middle school, or Hauptschule (pl., Hauptschulen), or the first four years of an eight-year university preparatory track at higher schools of general education (Allgemeinbildende Höhere Schulen, or AHS). An AHS, also known as a gymnasium, is an institution providing different fields of specialization that grant the diploma (Reifeprüfung or Matura) needed to enter university. (Other than Berufsbildende Höhere Schulen, which also allows access to university, they do not provide graduates with any specific skill immediately useful on the labor market, but concentrate on general education in the humanities, science, and languages).

Before the 1962 reform, the great majority of children, more than 90%, attended the compulsory Hauptschule, where they were divided according to their performance in elementary school into two groups: an “A group,” which was directed toward two- to four-year vocational-technical training schools after graduation from the Hauptschule; and a “B group,” which was required to complete one additional year of compulsory education before entrance into apprenticeship programs or the workforce. The remaining elementary-school graduates—less than 10%—enrolled in the AHS at age eleven. Children attending these university-track schools also had to choose a specific course of study.

The rigidity of the two-track system required that the most important educational decision in a child’s life—with all of the implications it had for the future—be made at the age of ten. The decision depended to a great extent on the parents’ background, income, and social status. Children from agricultural backgrounds or of urban working-class parents generally attended the Volkschule and the Hauptschule and then entered the workforce. Children having lower-middle-class backgrounds frequently received vocational-technical training after the Hauptschule, while children from the upper-middle and upper classes, boys, in particular, attended the AHS, which gave them access to university-level education.

The early selection process meant that children of the largest segment of the population, farmers, and workers, were grossly under-represented at higher schools and universities, whereas the children of a relatively small segment of the population, those who had attended higher schools or the universities, were over-represented. Consequently, the education system tended to reproduce or reinforce traditional social structures instead of being a vehicle of opportunity or social mobility.

The Act of 1962 and subsequent amendments require that all state-funded schools be open to children regardless of birth, gender, race, status, class, language, or religion. The law also attempts to introduce more flexibility into the traditional two-track system and provide students with a greater degree of latitude within it. Hence, educational (and hence career) decisions can be made at an older age. Although the primary and secondary school system continues to be fundamentally based on the two-track idea, after a series of reforms in the 1970s and 1980s, ten- to fourteen-year-olds are no longer streamed into A and B groups in the Hauptschule. Graduates of this kind of school also have the opportunity to cross over into certain branches of the AHS track at the age of fourteen or to attend a series of different “higher vocational-technical schools” (Berufsbildende Höhere Schulen and Höhere Technische Lehranstalten), which have five-year programs of specialization in various branches of technology (HTL = Höhere Technische Lehranstalt) and business and commerce (HAK = Handelsakademie). Other than the less prestigious three-year Berufsbildende Mittlere Schulen, those schools allow graduates to move on to university.

Shifts in enrolment patterns reflect these changes in the school system. In the mid-1960s, less than 10% of all students finished the university preparatory AHS track, and more than 66% of them were male. By the early 1990s, more than 30% of all students finished the AHS track and just above 50% of them were female. Furthermore, a second educational path was developed that permitted some students without a diploma from the university-track AHS to enroll in a university.

As a general rule, the quality of Hauptschule education is high, especially in rural areas and small communities, where the schools have maintained their traditional social importance and where attendance at an AHS involves commuting considerable distances, or, for the inhabitants of more remote areas, boarding. In urban centers with a full spectrum of educational opportunities, the Hauptschule has become less popular, and parents who would not necessarily have enrolled their children in an AHS a few years ago have begun doing so. The increased enrolments have overburdened the AHS and created a shortage of students at the Hauptschulen and vocational-technical schools.

In some areas, this trend has been strengthened by the number of children of foreign workers in compulsory schools. In 1991, for example, almost 30% of all school-age children in Vienna were children of foreign-born workers, whose mother tongue was not German. In some districts of the city, these children exceeded 70%. Although the children of long-term foreign workers frequently speak German well, the numbers of classes in which students with inadequate mastery of German are over-represented has overburdened the Hauptschule system and made it a less desirable alternative than it used to in the past. Therefore, special remedial and intercultural programs are being developed so that the compulsory school system in Austria can continue to fulfill its educational and social roles.

The SPÖ has continued to press for further reforms of the school system. It argued for abolishing the two-track system for ten- to fourteen-year-olds and combining the Hauptschule and the first four years of the AHS into a new comprehensive middle school. As of 2007, however, this alternative has been limited to some experimental schools. Other political parties, the Austrian People's Party in particular, remain firmly in favor of the current system, claiming that a comprehensive middle school could not accommodate for different levels of capability and talent. They fear a general "dumbing down" of secondary education as a result. Owing to the particular nature of Austria's educational laws (a two-thirds majority is required, see above) a multi-party consensus is needed to change the status quo.

Headscarves were banned in 2019 from primary schools, but Kippas worn by Jewish boys and the turban worn by Sikh boys were exempted in the legislature. The Austrian legislators said their motivation was promoting equality between men and women and improving social integration with respect to local customs, and parents who send their child to school with a headscarf would be fined €440 ($427 or £386 as of 2022). In 2020 however, the law was overturned by the constitutional court after it was found to be unconstitutional. The court said the legislature was required to treat various religious convictions equally, because the ban did not apply to the Jewish Kippa or to the turban worn by Sikh males. But in 2025 Austria banned girls under the age of fourteen from wearing headscarves at recess and lessons in school, with the law taking effect in September 2026.

== Matura ==
The official term for Matura in Austria is Reifeprüfung. The document received after the successful completion of the written and oral exams is called Maturazeugnis.

In the gymnasium (AHS = Allgemeinbildende Höhere Schule), which, as opposed to vocational schools, focuses on general education, the Matura consists of 3–4 written exams (referred to as Schriftliche Arbeit, 4–5 hours each) to be taken on consecutive mornings (usually in May) and 2-3 oral exams to be taken on the same half-day about a month later (usually in June). All examinations are held at the school which the candidate last attended. Candidates have to write a scholarly paper (called Vorwissenschaftliche Arbeit) to be submitted at the beginning of February. This paper also needs to be defended in an oral exam.

Vocational schools with a focus on either business and economics or technical subjects, such as commercial academies (HAK = "Handelsakademie") and polytechnics (HTL = "Höhere Technische Lehranstalt") also finish with the Matura, but last five years as opposed to the four-year Oberstufe (upper stage) of the Gymnasium. In vocational schools, an Ausbildungsschwerpunkt is chosen by all students, which then constitutes the main focus of their schooling, and is a compulsory subject at the Matura examinations.

The grading system is the one universally used in Austrian schools:

- 1 (sehr gut) is excellent;
- 2 (gut) is good;
- 3 (befriedigend) is satisfactory;
- 4 (genügend) is sufficient and
- 5 (nicht genügend) means that you have failed.

In addition, a candidate’s Maturazeugnis contains a formalized overall assessment: "mit ausgezeichnetem Erfolg bestanden" (pass with distinction: an average of 1.5 or better, no grade below 3), "mit gutem Erfolg bestanden" (pass with merit: an average of 2.0 or better, no grade below 3), "bestanden" (pass: no grade below 4); and nicht bestanden (fail: at least one grade 5). Candidates who have failed may re-take their exams in September/October or February/March of the following school year.

Compulsory subjects for the written finals are German and Mathematics, as well as a modern foreign language (usually English, French, Spanish or Italian).

Since 2015, the Matura system has become more centralized, leading to significant criticism. There is only one external examiner: the candidate’s own (former) teachers. While the exam board technically includes the candidate’s teachers, the headmaster, and a senior official, all oral exams are public but rarely attended by anyone other than classmates.

Adults of all ages can take the Matura, usually after attending private adult education institutions. These exams are held separately with a regional board.

Critics argue the system promotes rote learning, stifles creativity, and fails to reflect the constantly evolving nature of knowledge. Alternatives like portfolios, teamwork, and peer reviews have been suggested.

In fiction, Friedrich Torberg’s novel Der Schüler Gerber (1930) about a Matura candidate driven to suicide on the day of his oral exams by his cruel mathematics teacher has become a classic.

== Higher education ==
=== Universities ===
The General Act for University Education of 1966 and the University Organization Act of 1975 provide the legal framework for tertiary education, and the federal Ministry for Science and Research funds and oversees education at the university level.

Austria's 22 public and 17 private universities enjoy a high degree of autonomy and offer a full spectrum of degrees. Established in 1365, the University of Vienna is Austria’s oldest and largest university.

As a result of the reforms since the 1960s, the university system has changed from one serving the elite to one serving the masses. The growing number of students at Austrian universities reflects the liberalization of educational policy at secondary and higher levels. Between the 1955–56 and 1991–92 academic years, the number of students enrolled in institutions of higher education increased from about 19,000 to more than 200,000. The number of students beginning university-level education after completing the AHS program also increased and amounted to 85% in 1990, compared with 60% in the mid-1960s. University education also became more accessible to women. From 1960 to 1992, the proportion of female students rose from 23% to 44%. However, in 1990, women made up only 2% of professors.

Despite the increase in the numbers of university students and the greater presence of women, universities remain primarily the domain of middle- and higher-income groups. The proportion of students from working-class backgrounds doubled from 7 to 14%, and the number of these from agricultural backgrounds increased from less than 2% to more than 4% between 1960 and 1990. But children of white-collar workers, civil servants, and the self-employed accounted for more than 80% of enrollments at Austrian institutions of higher education in the early 1990s.

The country’s university system was free until 2001; since then studies have been subject to fees (€366 per term for Austrian citizens, about €700 per term for non-Austrians). In 2008, however, the government decided to abolish fees for students who complete their studies in the minimum time and are EU/EEA citizens, but not for others.

=== Fachhochschulen (Universities of Applied Sciences) since the 1990s ===
During the 1990s, Austria introduced Fachhochschulen (University of Applied Sciences) in addition to the traditional universities. The training at these colleges is more tailored to practically applicable professional skills. Furthermore, students are allowed much less liberty in choosing which and how many courses they take during a given semester, which ensures that all students graduate within the prescribed time (usually three years for the bachelor's degree). In 2025, 21 Universities of applied studies exist in Austria.

=== Private Universities since 2001 ===
Accreditation of private universities started in 2001, based on a federal law (Universitäts-Akkreditierungsgesetz). Accreditation includes the right to legally grant academic degrees. The Akkreditierungsrat (accreditation council, ) evaluates applicants and issues recommendations to the responsible accreditation authority, the Federal Ministry of Education, Science, and Cultural Affairs. Accreditations must be renewed regularly and can be withdrawn, e.g. in case of repeated academic misconduct. In 2003, the accreditation of International University Vienna was withdrawn. In 2006, when the accreditation of Imadec University expired, the accreditation council rejected the request for renewal. In 2025, there were 17 private universities accredited in Austria.

=== The Gehrer-Schüssel reforms ===
The former Minister of Education, Elisabeth Gehrer, of the Schüssel government, has enacted extensive reforms to the higher education system — sometimes referred to as the Gehrer-Schüssel reforms — during the last years. Effective 2003, universities have become independent juristic persons and have been given considerably more discretion by the law to act without ministerial control. However, codetermination of professors, junior teachers and students has been replaced by a more hierarchical system with a powerful management on top. The university councils, whose members are in part appointed by the government, are in charge of appointing the senior managers (Rektorat) and overseeing their activity.

Three medical universities (Vienna, Graz and Innsbruck) have been separated from their previous almae matres, and after undergoing the appropriate accreditation procedure two other private universities have now been established. Newly appointed professors are no longer government employees, and universities are supposed to compete with each other.

In spite of the potential the increased flexibility gives to universities, there are some severe problems with the reform. First, budgets have not been increased (except to account for inflation), even though it is more expensive to hire professors as private employees, because of taxes and increased social insurance contributions.

Universities are not able to select students for admission, and they are not permitted to penalize students who abuse free access to university and free choice in studies. Moderate tuition fees were introduced in 2001, which are supposed to create a small incentive for students to graduate more quickly.

=== Academic degrees ===
In Austria, there is no institution comparable to the American college or to the American professional school. Students enroll in one (or more) field of studies, in which they are expected to graduate after four to six years. Since the 1970s, the first degree was the Magister (= Latin for Master, abbr. Mag.) in the humanities, economic and social sciences, law and natural sciences. The first degree in engineering and agriculture is the Diplom-Ingenieur (abbr. Dipl.-Ing. or DI).

In accordance with the Bologna process, many universities committed to transforming their system to distinguish between Bachelor and Master degrees, typically lasting three years for the Bachelor's degree and one to two years for the Master's degree.

Medicine is left as the subject where a doctorate is the only degree (after at least six years). In most subject fields, students need to submit a Diplomarbeit, a research paper of an average of about 100 pages, but sometimes considerably longer.

Postgraduate degrees such as LL.M.s and MBAs have been introduced since the 1990s.

== The debate on reform ==
Debates about educational policy in Austria frequently are the result of different perspectives related to the strengths and weaknesses of the traditional education system.

- Proponents of the two-track secondary system, for example, defend it as performance oriented and criticize the leveling of achievement or lowering of standards the introduction of a single compulsory middle school would involve.
- Conversely, opponents of the two-track system criticize its rigidity and inherent absence of equal opportunity.

Consequently, such bipolar terms as performance and leveling, elite and mass education, and achievement and equal opportunity prevail in educational debates. In some , Austrians of different political and educational policy persuasions may expect too many different things from one university system. They expect it to provide general education, as do state university systems in the United States, and “Ivy League” performance at the same time.

This page incorporates material from Austria: Country Studies Federal Research Division.

== See also ==
- Open access in Austria
- Academic grading in Austria
