= Herbert Rosenkranz =

Jewish historian

Herbert Rosenkranz (7 July 1924 in Vienna – 5 September 2003) was a Jewish historian.

== Life ==
Herbert Rosenkranz grew up in the Viennese district of Brigittenau. His Jewish parents, Michael and Mircia, (maiden name Kesten), and his grandparents had immigrated from Eastern Europe. The family emigrated to Riga, Latvia after the Anschluss of Austria into Nazi Germany. After the Soviet occupation of Latvia in 1940, from 1941 to 1947 Herbert Rosenkranz was interned in several Soviet prison camps. From 1947 to 1953 he studied history and English at the University of Vienna. When he had finished his thesis on Chazaro-Judaism Herbert Rosenkranz emigrated to Israel. There he taught at grammar schools until 1955, when he started to work as an archivist at the Yad Vashem memorial in Jerusalem. Later he became head of the department for investigation of NS-Crimes at the archive. In 1960/61 Herbert Rosenkranz was an assistant professor for Jewish History at the University of Tel Aviv, from 1968 to 1977 he lectured at the Hebrew University of Jerusalem.

Herbert Rosenkranz supported the Holocaust Memorial Service of young Austrians in Israel from the very beginning. He also had contact to the German Action Reconciliation/Service For Peace (ARSP) and sought to establish the dialogue with German clergymen. In the 1980s Herbert Rosenkranz worked as a guest lecturer at the Academy for Jewish Studies in Heidelberg and also at several Austrian universities.

His Brother, Kurt Rosenkranz founded the Jewish Institute for Adult Education in Vienna in 1993, and his daughter, Orna Langer, is a music critic at Haaretz.

== Bibliography ==
- Verfolgung und Selbstbehauptung. Die Juden in Österreich 1938–1945. Herold Verlag, Wien 1978. (in German)
- Reichskristallnacht. 9. November 1938 in Österreich. Europa, Wien 1968. (in German)
- "The Anschluß and the Tragedy of Austrian Jewry 1938–1945". In: The Jews of Austria. Hg. Josef Fraenkel. Vallentine Mitchell, London 1967.
