= Academic grading in Austria =

In Austria, academic grades use a 5-point grading scale with no decimals, grade 5 („Nicht genügend“) is fail, all other grades are pass.

A definition of the grades for schools is contained in Section 14 of Leistungsbeurteilungsverordnung.

At universities, no formal definition of the grades is available; it is the responsibility of the course instructors to announce their grading principles in advance. Typical interpretation of grades is as follows:

Academic Grading in Austria
Grade	German meaning	English meaning	Explanation
1	Sehr gut	Very good	Outstanding performance with no or only minor errors
2	Gut	Good	Above-average standard but with some errors
3	Befriedigend	Satisfactory	Average performance with a number of notable errors
4	Genügend	Adequate	Standard but with a significant number of shortcomings
5	Nicht genügend	Unsatisfactory	Failing grade

== Details of the Austrian system ==
The Austrian grading system offers a range of five different grades (1 to 5), with 1 (Sehr gut) being the highest and 5 (Nicht genügend) the lowest grade. Students must be evaluated according to objective standards and need to earn at least a grade of 4 (Genügend) in order to pass a course.

The GPA is commonly used to measure academic success and has become increasingly important for application purposes. Nowadays, most employers ask for your last school certificate when applying for an apprenticeship. The Austrian system is similar to the German system.
