= Scaletti =

Scaletti is an Italian surname. Notable people with the surname include:

- Carla Scaletti (born 1956), American harpist, composer, and music technologist
- Leonardo Scaletti (c. 1435 – before 1495), Italian painter
