= Battle of Schwarze Lackenau =

The battle of Schwarze Lackenau was a minor battle during the War of the Fifth Coalition which was fought near Vienna on 13 May 1809 and was an unsuccessful attempt by the French army to cross the river Danube on the isle of Schwarze Lackenau near to the hamlets of Jedlesee and Floridsdorf.

After the fall of Vienna, Napoleon was looking for ways to cross the Danube to engage the Austrian Hauptarmee led by the Archduke Charles. On 13 May 1809 troops under general de division Saint-Hilaire attempted to cross to the Schwarze Lackenau to establish a base for further operations. The isle was about 3 kilometer long and 500 to 100 meter in width and was separated from the northern Danube shore by a small water arm called the Schwarze Lacke (“Black Water”). The isle was connected to the northern shore by a small weir.

At 2 PM Saint-Hilaire sent three compagnies of voltigeurs from the 72nd Ligne by boat to the isle and by 4 PM those troops had reached the other side of the isle where they were noticed by Austrian outposts stationed on the northern Danube shore. As a first reaction colonel von Csollich, the chief of staff of FML Hiller of the VI Corps, sent a unit of Landwehr to reconnoiter and the leading company collided with the French troops which chased the Austrians towards the dyke. Meanwhile, Csollich had ordered the rest of the Landwehr battalion to cross in order to delay the French advance until regular Austrian army troops could reinforce the Landwehr. By the time the first regular troops – Infantry regiment Kerpen nr. 49 – reached the scene the Landwehr units were crumbling. The Austrian regular troops managed to hold the line and to push back the 72nd Ligne towards the hunting lodge situated at the southern side of the isle. The French managed to hold the line there and were reinforced by troops from the 105th Ligne and were supported by an artillery battery of 26 guns placed by Napoleon on the southern shore of the Danube.

By 7.30 PM, the Austrians led by major O’Brien managed to use a fence as cover to outflank the French line. This attack unhinged the French line and led to the collapse of the French position. Ultimately the French troops remaining on the isle were forced to surrender to the Austrian troops.

The French lost about 700 men from a force of about 1000 which had been put across the river. The Austrians lost about 300 men from Kerpen and about 150 Landwehr. The attempt at Schwarze Lackenau alerted the Austrians to the vulerability of the location and they took measures to better safeguard the position. It caused Napoleon to look at a different crossing site and his next attempt a week later led to the battle of Aspern-Essling.
