= Francesco del Cossa =

Italian painter of Renaissance era

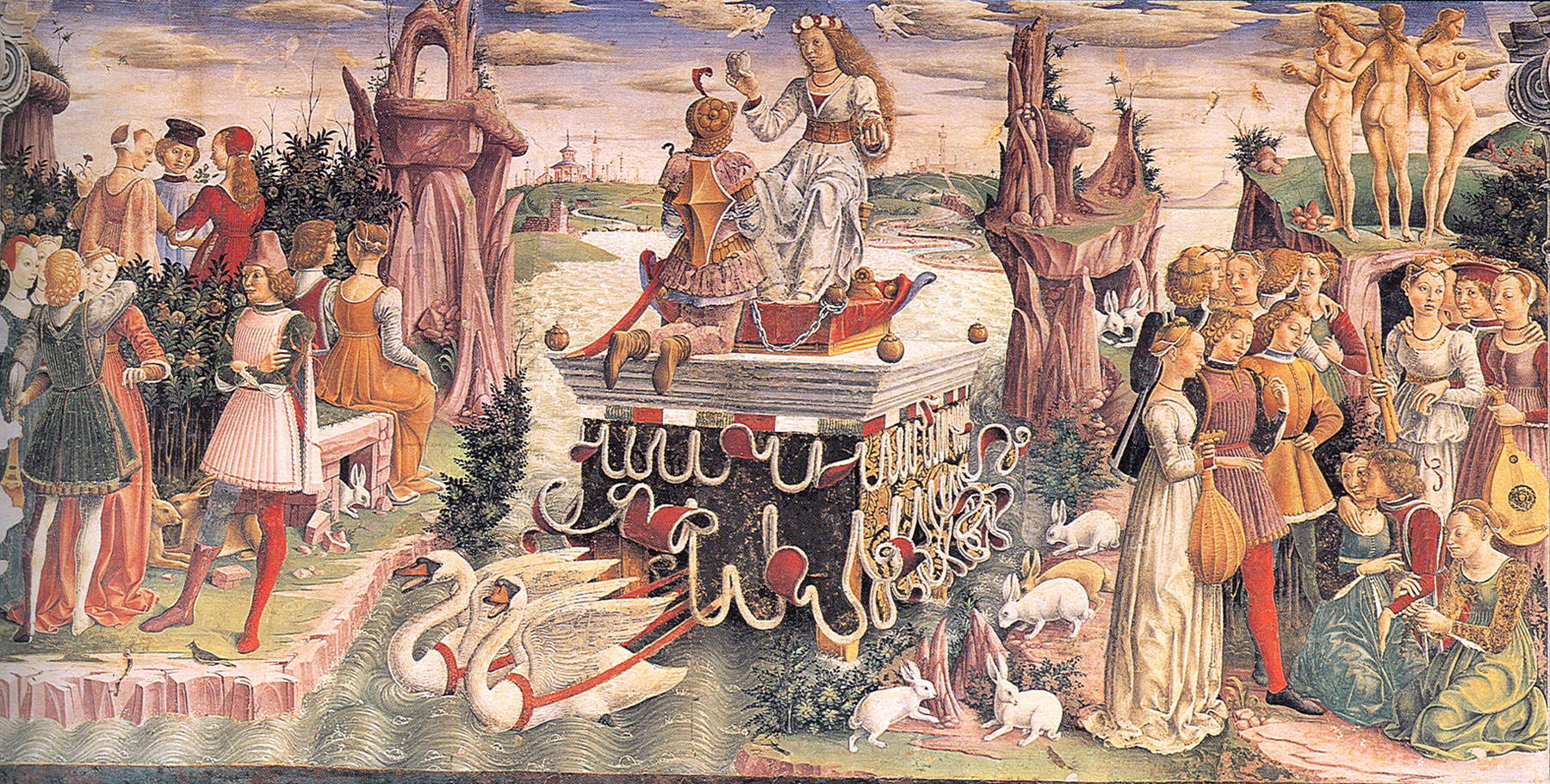
Allegory of April, fresco Palazzo Schifanoia, Ferrara

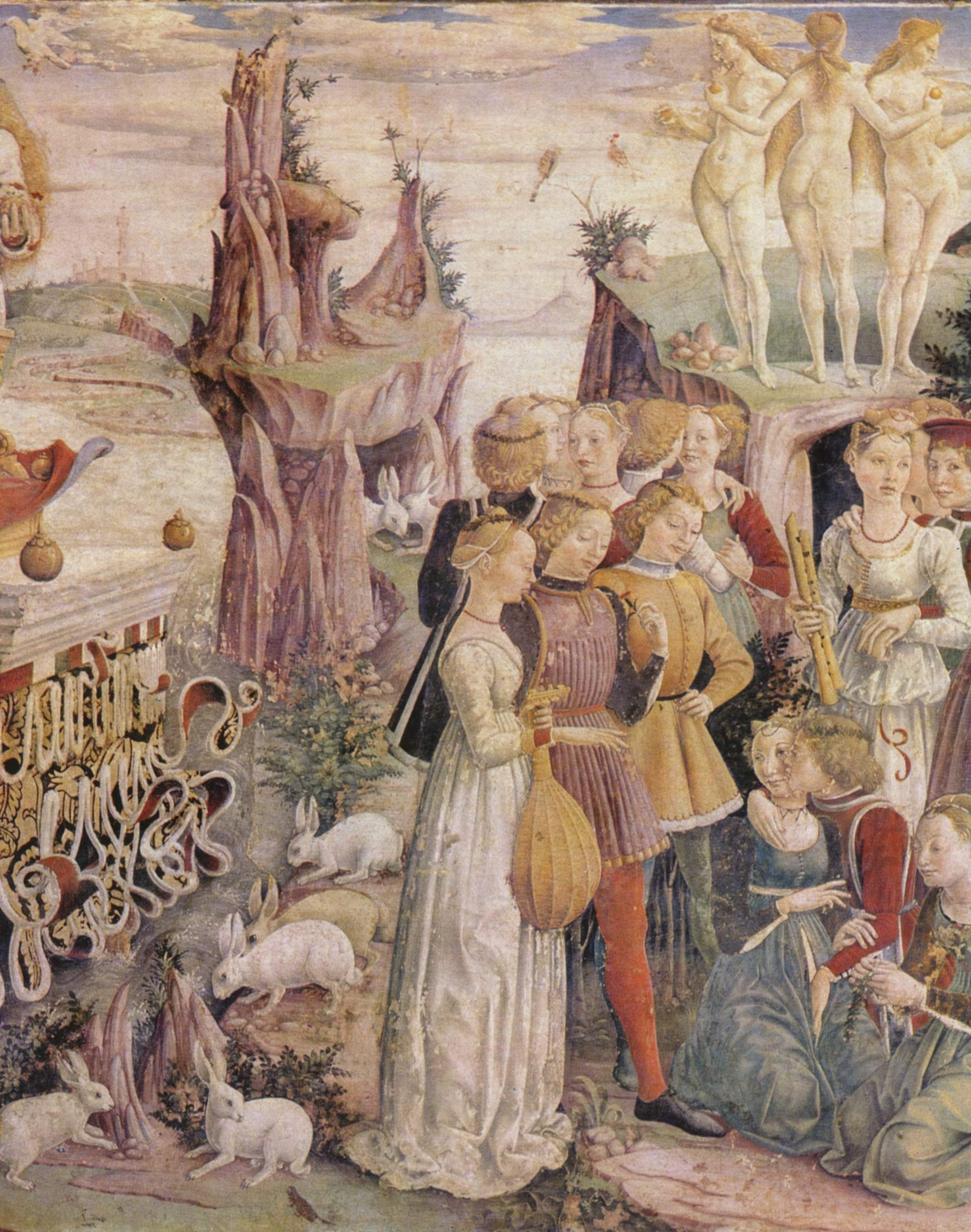
Detail showing The Three Graces

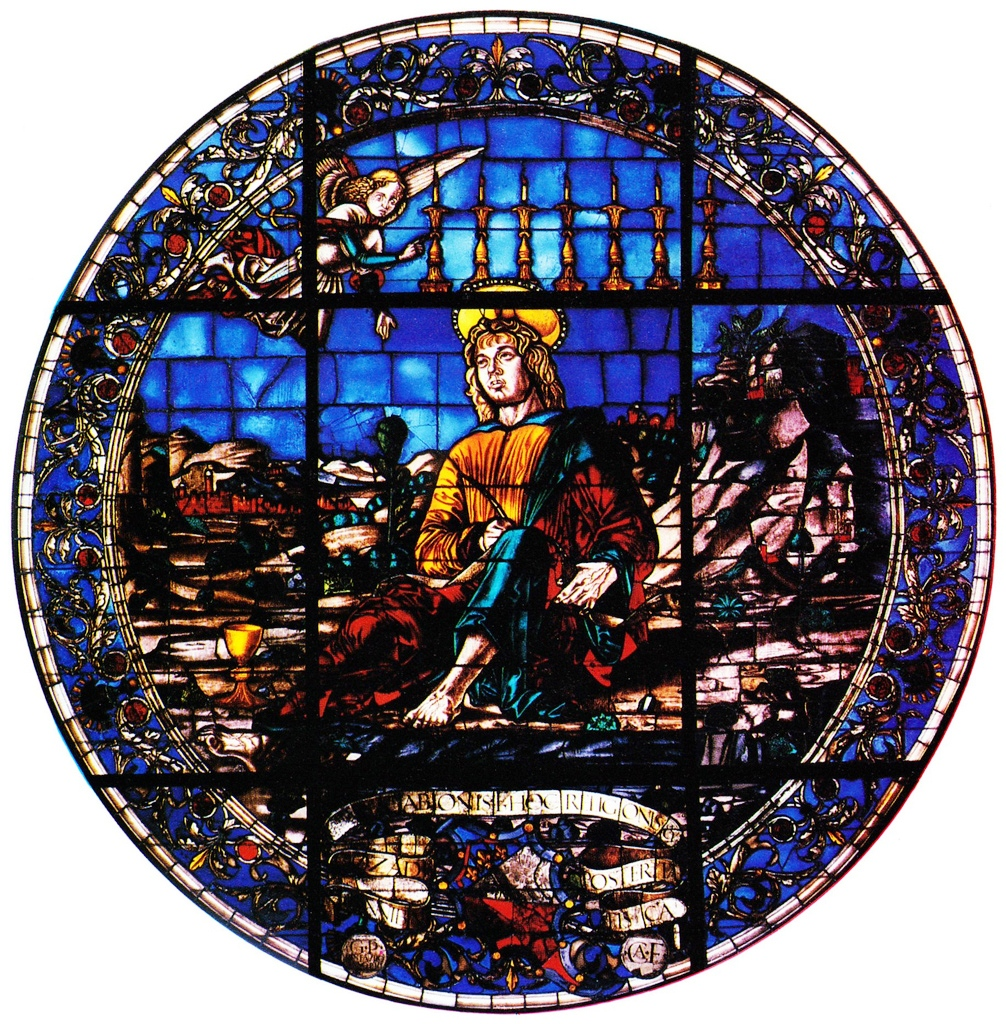
St. John of Patmos. Stained glass window in entrance of San Giovanni in Monte, Bologna, ca. 1480.

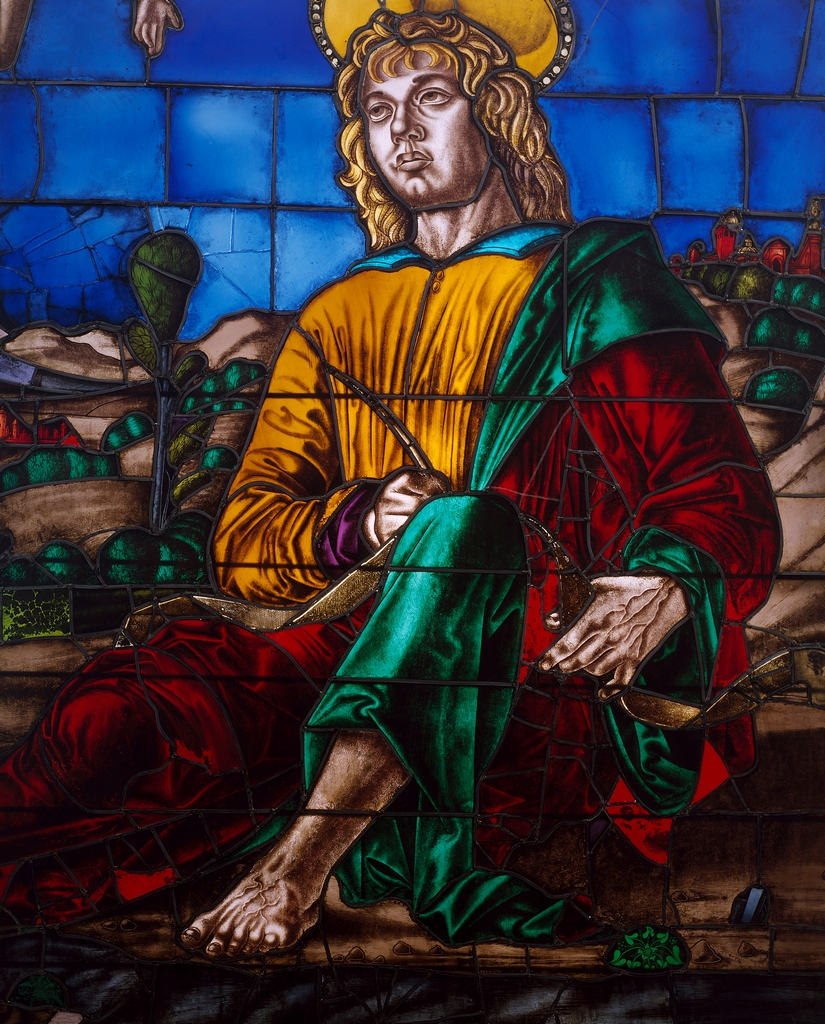
Detail

Francesco del Cossa (c. 1430 – c. 1477) was an Italian Renaissance painter of the School of Ferrara, who after 1470 worked in Bologna. Cossa is best known for his frescoes, especially his collaboration with Cosimo Tura on a cycle of the months in the Palazzo Schifanoia of the Este family, rulers of Ferrara. Otherwise, his paintings are mostly of religious subjects, with some portraits and drawings attributed to him. He also designed stained glass.

== Biography ==
Francesco was the son of a stonemason in Ferrara, little is known about his early works, although it is known that he travelled outside of Ferrara in his late twenties or early thirties.

One of the first records we have of him is in 1456 when he was an assistant to his father, Cristofano del Cossa, at that time employed in painting the carvings and statues on the high altar in the chapel of the bishop's palace at Ferrara. One of his followers was Leonardo Scaletti of Faenza.

== Allegorical frescoes in the Palazzo Schifanoia ==
In conjunction with Cosimo Tura, Cossa is now known for fresco decoration of the summer pleasure villa/palazzo known as the Palazzo Schifanoia. Together, they painted a series of elaborate allegories around the themes of zodiac signs and months of the year. These were only partially restored in the 20th century, and there are three that are reasonably assigned to Cossa. Of these, one of the most remarkable images is the horde of naked toddlers in the Allegory of May – Triumph of Apollo. Apparently a sign of springtime's prolific blossoming, the crowded rows of babies mass like a phalanx of infantile Rockettes.

The Allegory of April has a depiction of the trio of Graces, one of the earliest Post-classical representations of the naked intertwined dancers in painting. Sandro Botticelli's version in Primavera dates from 1482. See the 1501 version of the Three Graces (now at Chantilly). Assuming the date of death of Cossa is correct, this one must have been completed prior to the others.

== Cossa in Bologna ==
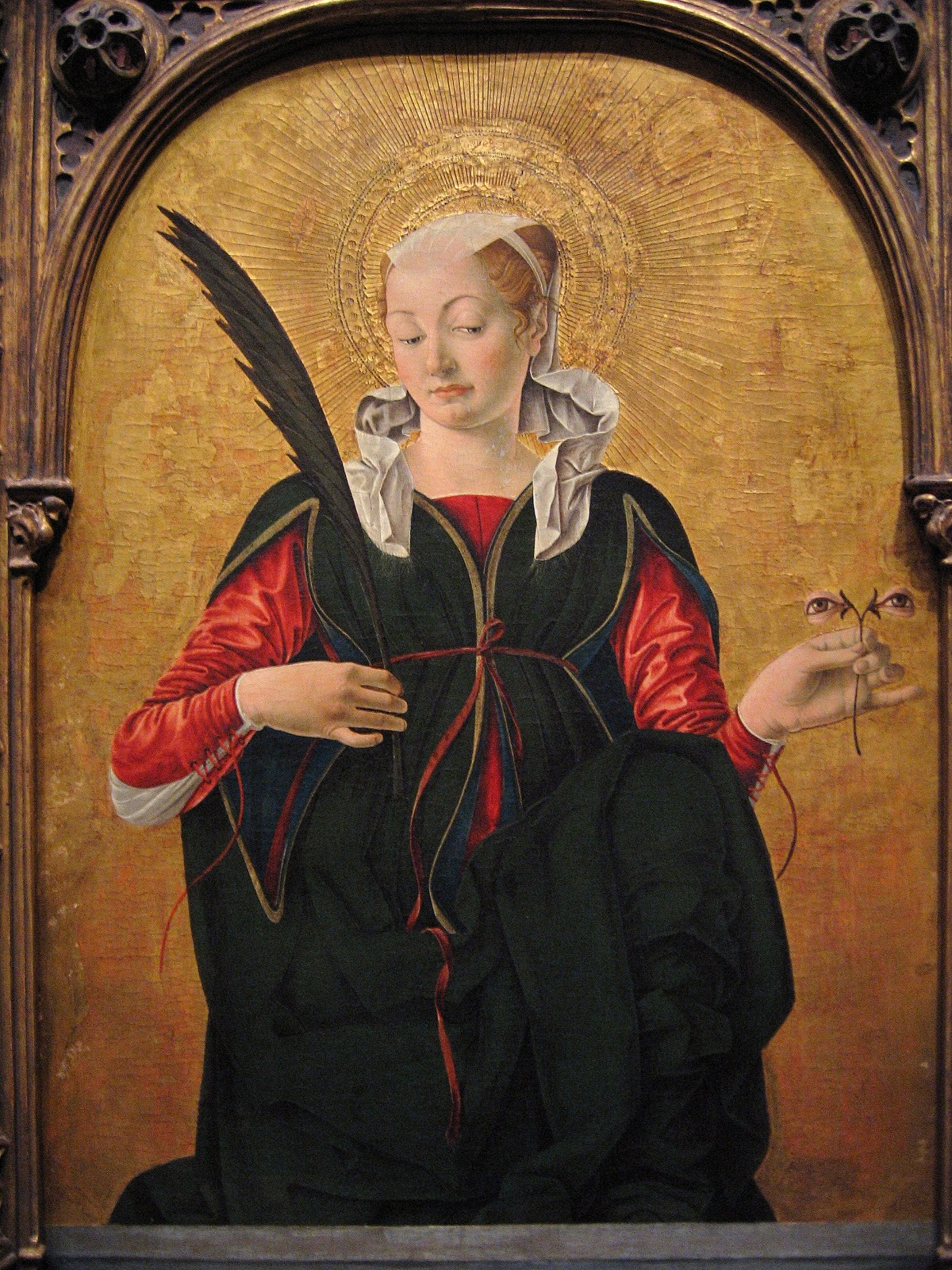
Saint Lucy

Unhappy that he had been paid by the square foot for his work for Duke Borso and complaining he was being paid the same as the "worst dauber in Ferrara", Cossa left Ferrara for Bologna in 1470.

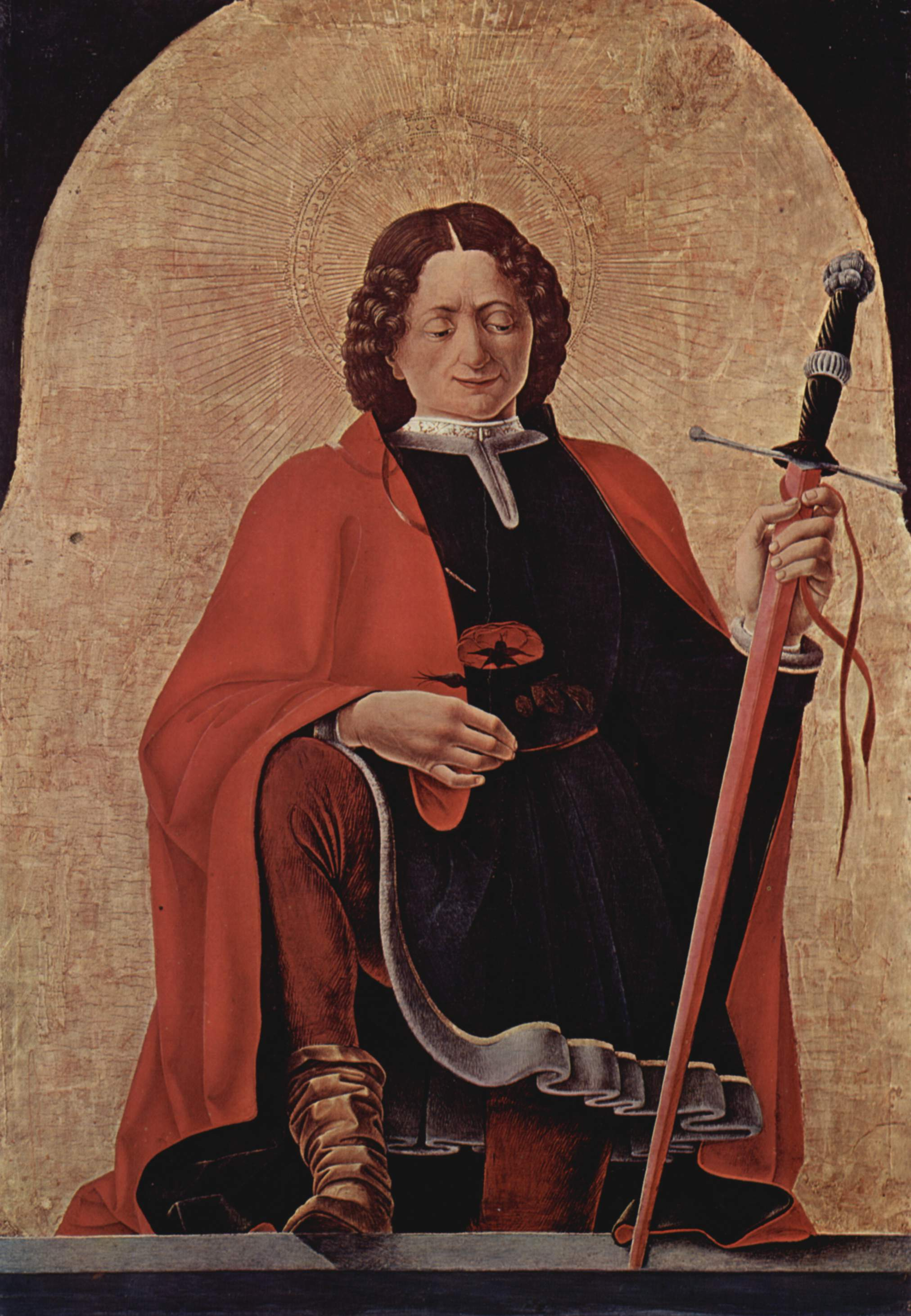
Saint Florian

In Bologna, he obtained many commissions under the patronage of the Bentivoglio family. Here he painted his two masterpieces: the Virgin and Child with two saints and a portrait of Alberto de' Catanei (1474) and fresco of the Madonna del Baracano, representing the Virgin and Child with portraits of Giovanni Bentivoglio and Maria Vinziguerra (1472).

He executed stained glass windows in Bologna, the best of which is a circular window, in the church of San Giovanni in Monte, representing St. John in Patmos. This bears his signature.

In the National Gallery of London, there is a picture by him representing St. Vincent Ferrer. There is a fine profile portrait at Locko Park near Derby, said to represent Duke Ercole I of Ferrara. In the Dresden collection there is also an Annunciation.

== Anthology of works ==
- Annunciation and Nativity (1470–1472 Dresden Gemäldegallerie alte Meister)
  St Claire (1470–1472, Thyssen-Bornemisza Museum, on deposit at the Museo Nacional de Arte de Cataluña)
  St Catherine (1470–1472, Thyssen-Bornemisza Museum, on deposit at the Museo Nacional de Arte de Cataluña)
- Griffoni Polyptych
  St Vincent Ferrer (1473, National Gallery, London)
  St Peter (1473, Pinacoteca di Brera, Milan)
  St John the Baptist (1473, Pinacoteca di Brera, Milan)
  St Florian 1473, National Gallery of Art, Washington)
  St Lucy (1473, National Gallery of Art, Washington)
  The Crucifixion (1473, National Gallery of Art, Washington)
  St Petronius (1473, Palazzo dei Diamanti, Ferrara)
  11 other small pictures from altarpiece (1473, ?, ?)
- Madonna with the Child and Saints (1474, Pinacoteca Nazionale, Bologna)
- Virgin and Child with an Angel (1460, Museu Nacional d'Art de Catalunya, Barcelona)
- Frescoes for Hall of Months, Palazzo Schifanoia, Ferrara (before 1470?)
  Allegory of April: Triumph of Venus
  Allegory of May: Triumph of Apollo
  Allegory of March: Triumph of Minerva
- Polyhymnia, the Muse of Many Songs
- Portrait of a Man with a ring (1472–1477, Thyssen-Bornemisza Museum, Madrid)

== In contemporary culture ==
The stained glass window was revealed to be the final answer of the Great Google Earth Treasure Hunt.

Del Cossa features as one of the two protagonists in Ali Smith's novel How to Be Both, short-listed for the 2014 Man Booker Prize.

== Sources ==
- D'Ancona, Paolo; Gnudi, Cesare (1954). The Schifanoia Months at Ferrara. Edizioni del Milione.
- Fogg Art Museum (1919). Collection of Mediaeval and Renaissance Paintings. Vol. 1. Harvard University Press.
- Hartt, Frederick; Wilkins, David G. (2011). History of Italian Renaissance Art: Painting, Sculpture, Architecture. Prentice Hall.
- Guo, Jingya (2023). "Phantom Truth and Renaissance Religious Images". In Majoul, Bootheina; Marino, Elisabetta; Lee, Hsuan; Wang, Yixiang (eds.). Proceedings of the 2023 5th International Conference on Literature, Art and Human Development (ICLAHD 2023). Atlantis Press SARL. pp. 81–94. ISBN 9782384761708.
- Williamson, George Charles (1908). "Cossa, Francesco". Catholic Encyclopedia. Vol. 4. Robert Appleton Company.
- Encyclopedia of Artists, volume 2, edited by William H. T. Vaughan, ISBN 0-19-521572-9, 2000
