= Saint Florian =

Christian saint (250–304)

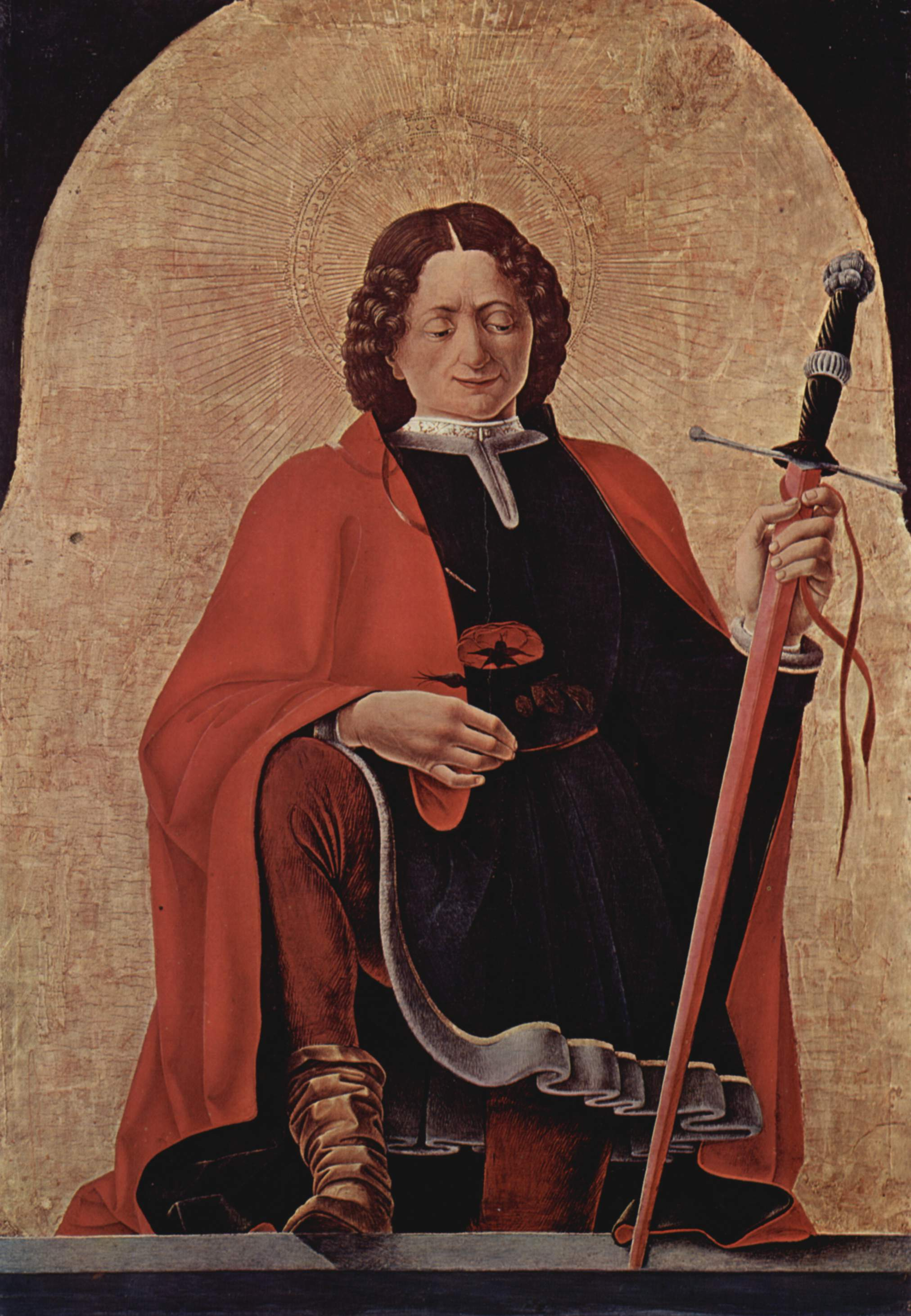
- St Florian by Francesco del Cossa, 1473

Martyr
- Born: AD 250; Aelium Cetium (present-day Sankt Pölten, Austria), Roman Empire
- Died: c. AD 304; Enns (river)
- Venerated in: Catholic Church; Eastern Orthodox Church
- Feast: 4 May
- Attributes: attire of a Roman soldier; pitcher of water; fire
- Patronage: chimneysweeps; firefighters; against fire; soap boilers, Upper Austria; Linz, Kraków

Florian (Latin: Florianus; AD 250 – c. 304) was a Christian holy man and the patron saint of chimney sweeps, soapmakers, and firefighters. His feast day is 4 May. Florian is also the patron saint of Poland; the city of Linz, Austria; and Upper Austria, jointly with Leopold III, Margrave of Austria.

== Life ==
Florian was born around AD 250 in the ancient Roman city of Aelium Cetium, present-day Sankt Pölten, Austria. He joined the Roman Army and advanced in the ranks, rising to commander of the imperial army in the Roman province of Noricum. In addition to his military duties, he was also responsible for organizing and leading firefighting brigades. Florian organized and trained an elite group of soldiers whose sole duty was to fight fires.

During the Diocletianic Persecution of Christians, reports reached Rome that Florian was not enforcing the proscriptions against Christians in his territory. Aquilinus was sent to investigate these reports. When Aquilinus ordered Florian to offer sacrifice to the Roman gods in accordance with Roman religion, Florian refused. Florian was sentenced to be burned at the stake. Standing on the funeral pyre, Florian is reputed to have challenged the Roman soldiers to light the fire, saying "If you wish to know that I am not afraid of your torture, light the fire, and in the name of the Lord I will climb onto it." Apprehensive of his words, the soldiers did not burn Florian, but executed him by drowning him in the Enns River with a millstone tied around his neck instead.

His body was later retrieved by Christians and buried at an Augustinian monastery near Lorch. Later a woman named Valeria had a vision in which she saw him; Florian, in this vision, declared his intent to be buried in a more appropriate location. Following this vision, she arranged for his remains to be reburied at the site where the monastery of St. Florian was later built.

== Veneration ==
Florian is very widely venerated in Central Europe. His feast day is 4 May. The Austrian town of Sankt Florian is named after him. According to legend, his body was interred at St. Florian Monastery, around which the town grew up.

Florian was adopted as patron saint of Poland in 1184, when Pope Lucius III consented to the request of Prince Casimir II to send relics of Florian to that country. Kraków thus claims some of his relics.

A statue of Florian by Josef Josephu was unveiled in Vienna in 1935. It stood at the main firehouse of Vienna, in the city's main square, Am Hof. After the firehouse was bombed in 1945 during World War II the statue was moved on to the Fire Brigade Museum (Wiener Feuerwehrmuseum).

Seeking the sponsorship of a helpful saint was and still is a part of the namegiving practice in Catholic areas. In the southern, Catholic, parts of the German Empire (mainly present Bavaria and Austria), peasants regularly have used the name, Florian, as one of the given names for at least one of their male children: to secure the saint's patronage against fire. Hence the given name is still widespread in these areas.

St Florian was also celebrated in Hungary. Two statues honoring Saints Vendel and Florian can be found in a small square in Zalavár, despite the village situates outside historically German-speaking regions.

=== Patronage ===
Florian is a patron saint of Upper Austria, Poland, firefighters, chimneysweeps, soap boilers, and brewers. Florian is associated with brewers because of a legend in which he miraculously stopped a fire with a single pitcher of water, thus the frequent depiction of him holding a pitcher.

Florian is invoked against fires, floods, lightning, and the pains of Purgatory.

A famous St. Florian's Church is located in Kraków, Poland. His veneration has been particularly intense since 1528, when a fire burned the neighborhood without destroying the church.

== In contemporary culture ==
The "Florian Principle" (known in German language areas as "Sankt-Florians-Prinzip") is named after a somewhat ironic prayer to Saint Florian: "O heiliger Sankt Florian, verschon' mein Haus, zünd' and're an," equivalent to "O Holy St. Florian, please spare my house, set fire to another one". This saying is used in German much like the English "not in my back yard", when the speaker wants to point out that some person tries to get out of an unpleasant situation by an action that will put others in that very same situation.

In Austria and Germany, "Florian" is the call sign for fire engines.

The protagonist in Felix Salten's novel Florian: The Emperor’s Stallion was named after Florian, as the animal was born on 4 May 1901 in Lipizza, Austria.

Alfred Schnittke's Symphony No. 2, is subtitled "St. Florian".

In multiple cities across Slovakia, streets are named after Saint Florian, often in correlation with local fire departments. Florian Street (Floriánska ulica) occurs in historic boroughs of major cities: currently in Košice (Staré Mesto) and also formerly in Bratislava (Staré Mesto).

== Gallery ==
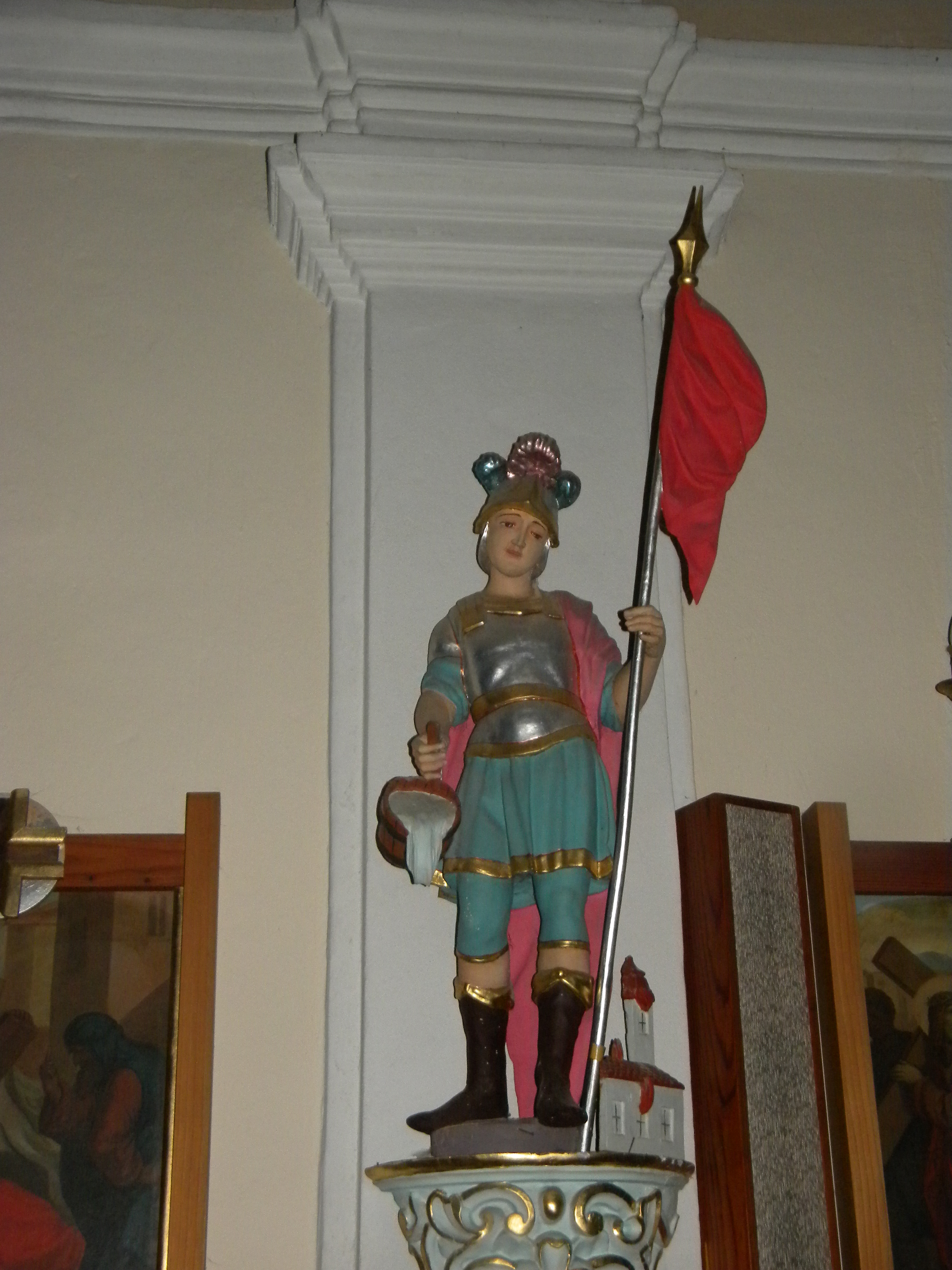
St. Florian in St. Andrew's Church in Andraž nad Polzelo (Slovenia)

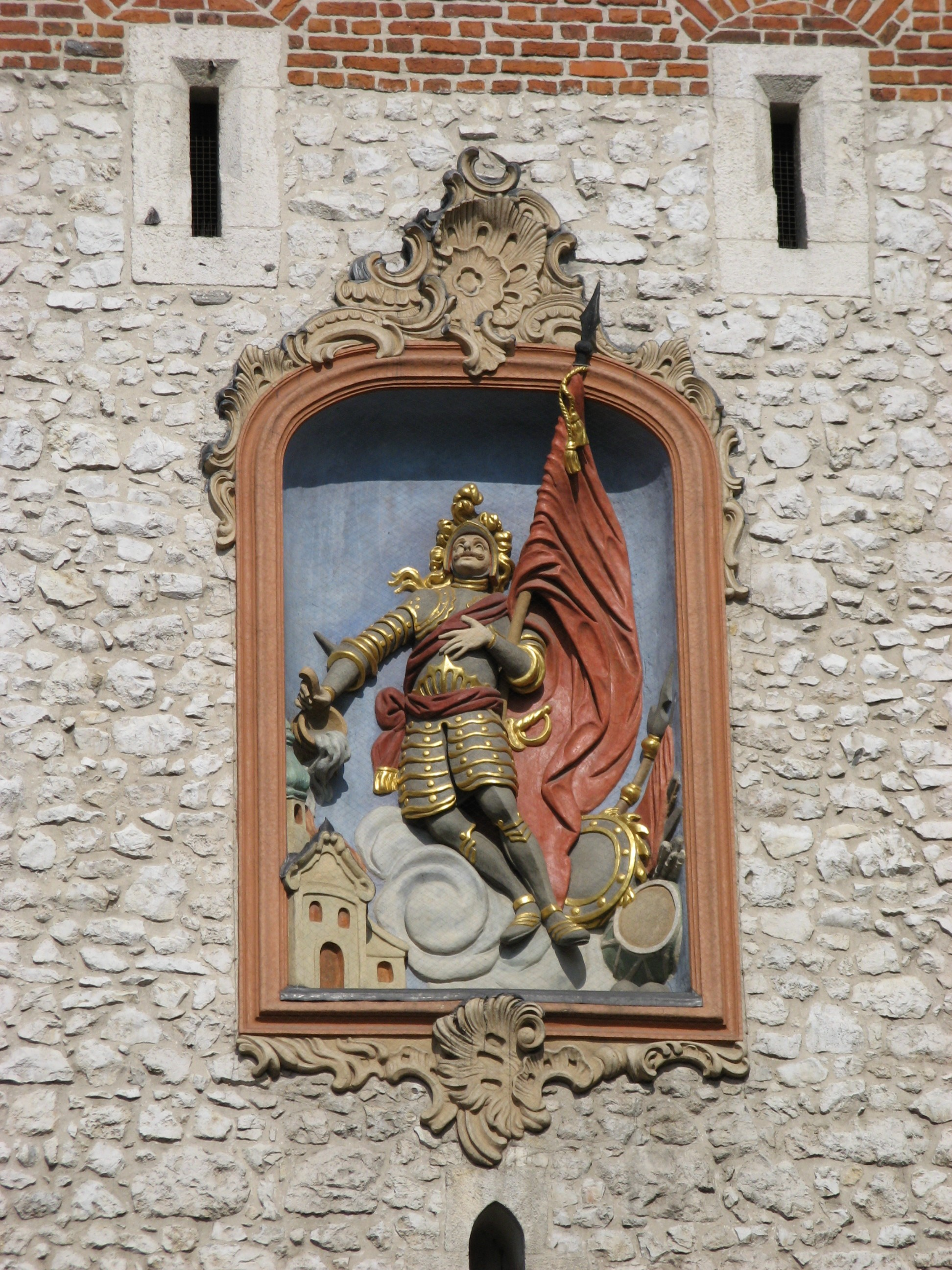
Bas-relief of St. Florian on St. Florian's Gate in Kraków

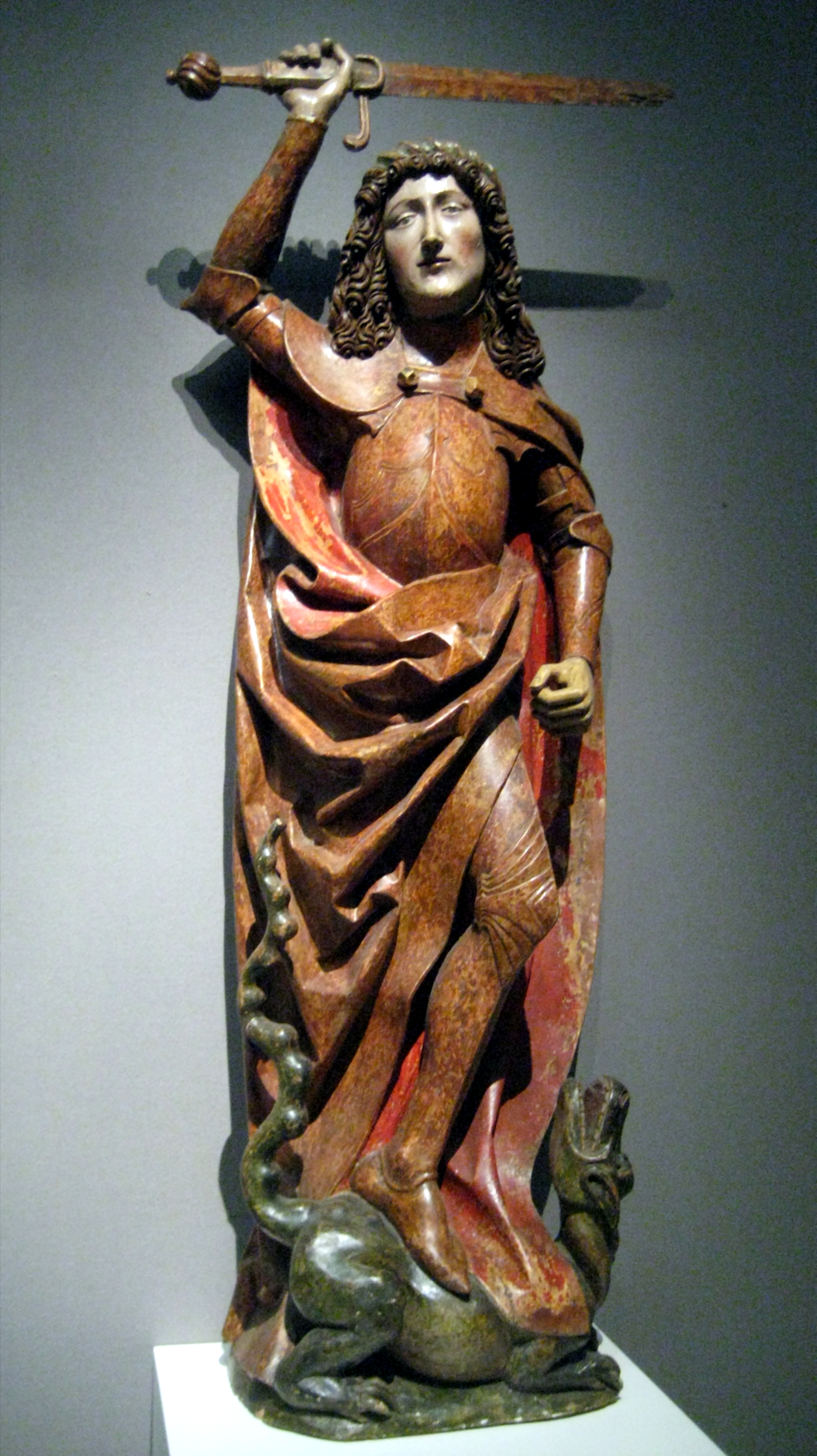

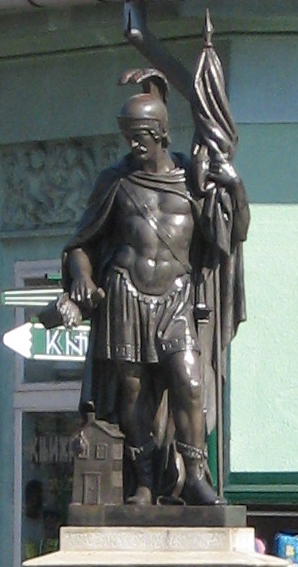
Statue of St. Florian at a crossroads in Pančevo (Serbia)

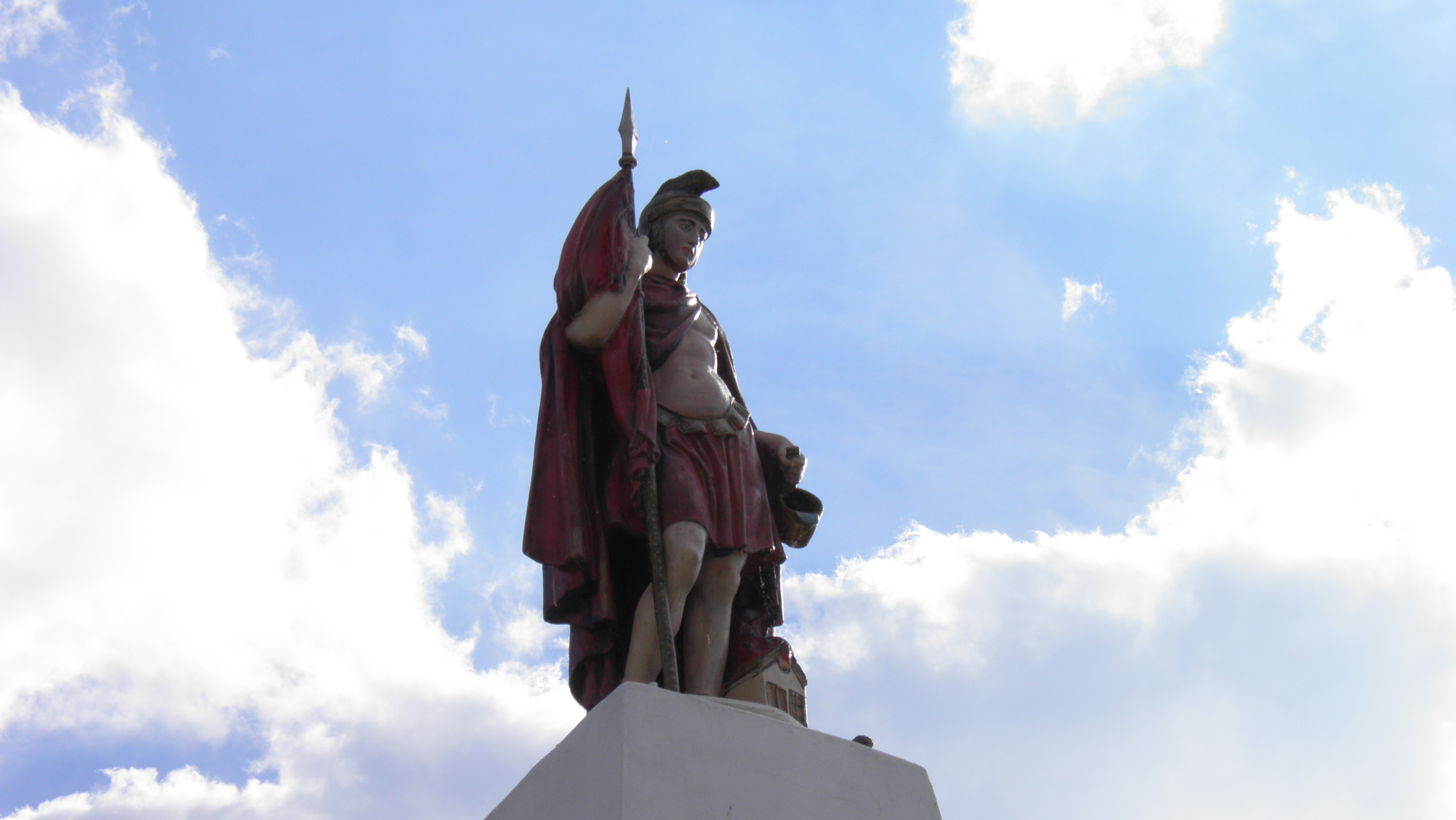
Statue of St. Florian at a crossroads near Komarówka Podlaska (Poland)

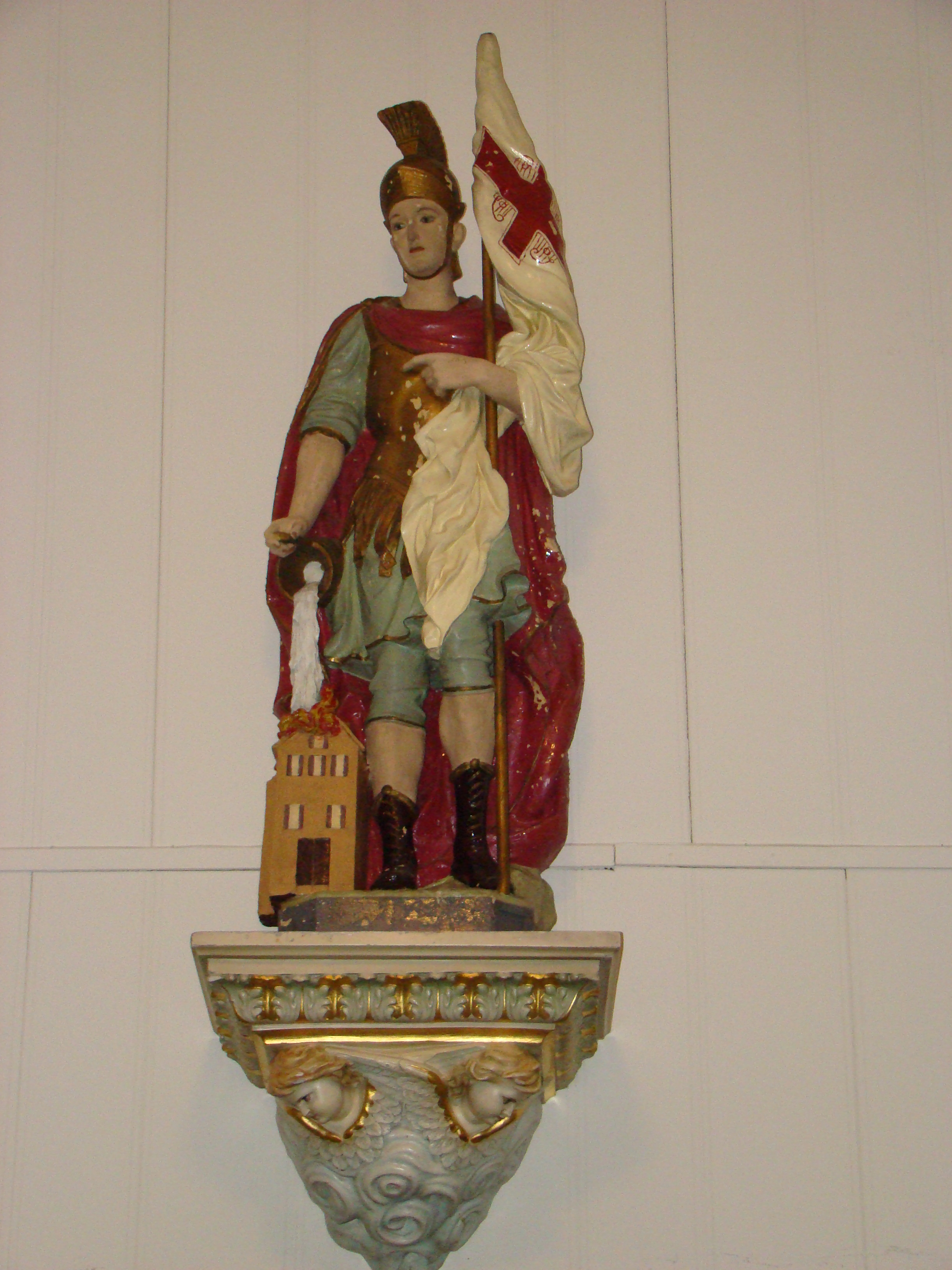
Statue of Saint Florian, located above the altar at Saint Florian Catholic Church in Ino, Wisconsin, United States

The Firefighter's Cross, sometimes mistakenly referred to as a Maltese cross

Firefighter's Cross variant

== See also ==
- St. Florian's Church in Kraków, the resting place of St. Florian's relics
