= Vienna Danube regulation =

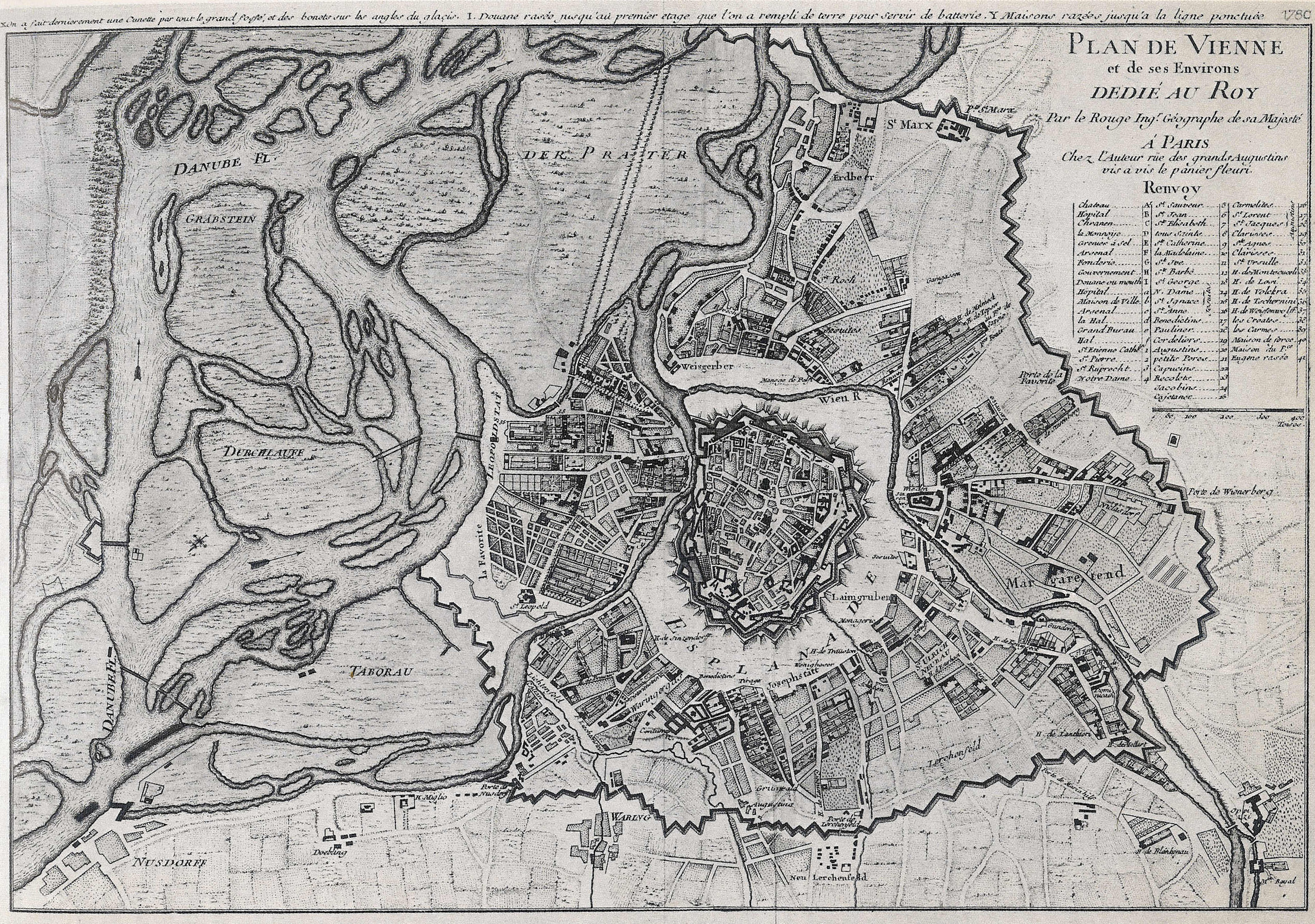
Detail view of the still unregulated Danube in Vienna in the year 1780.

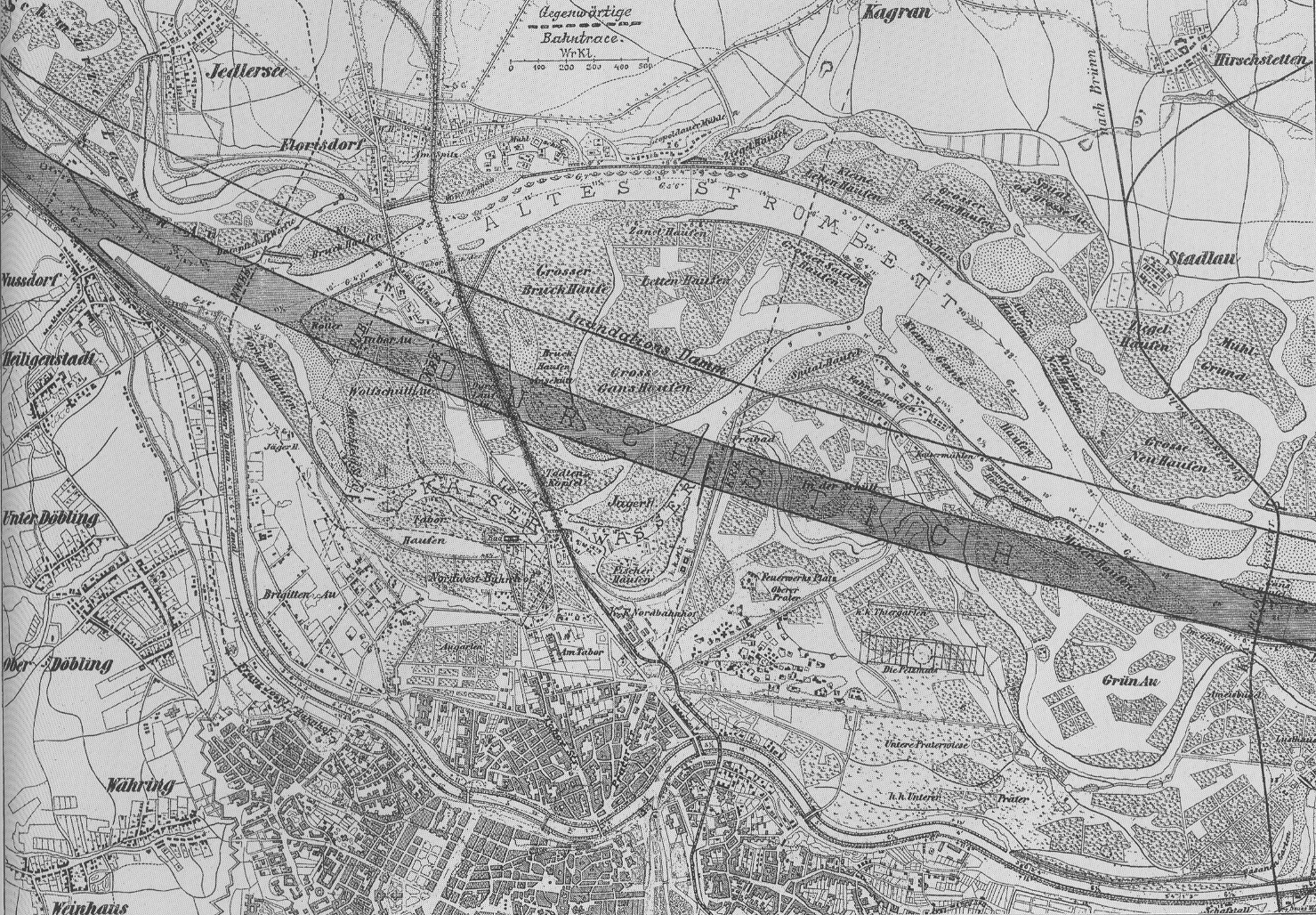
Plan of the Danube dig for 1870-75 in a contemporary presentation.

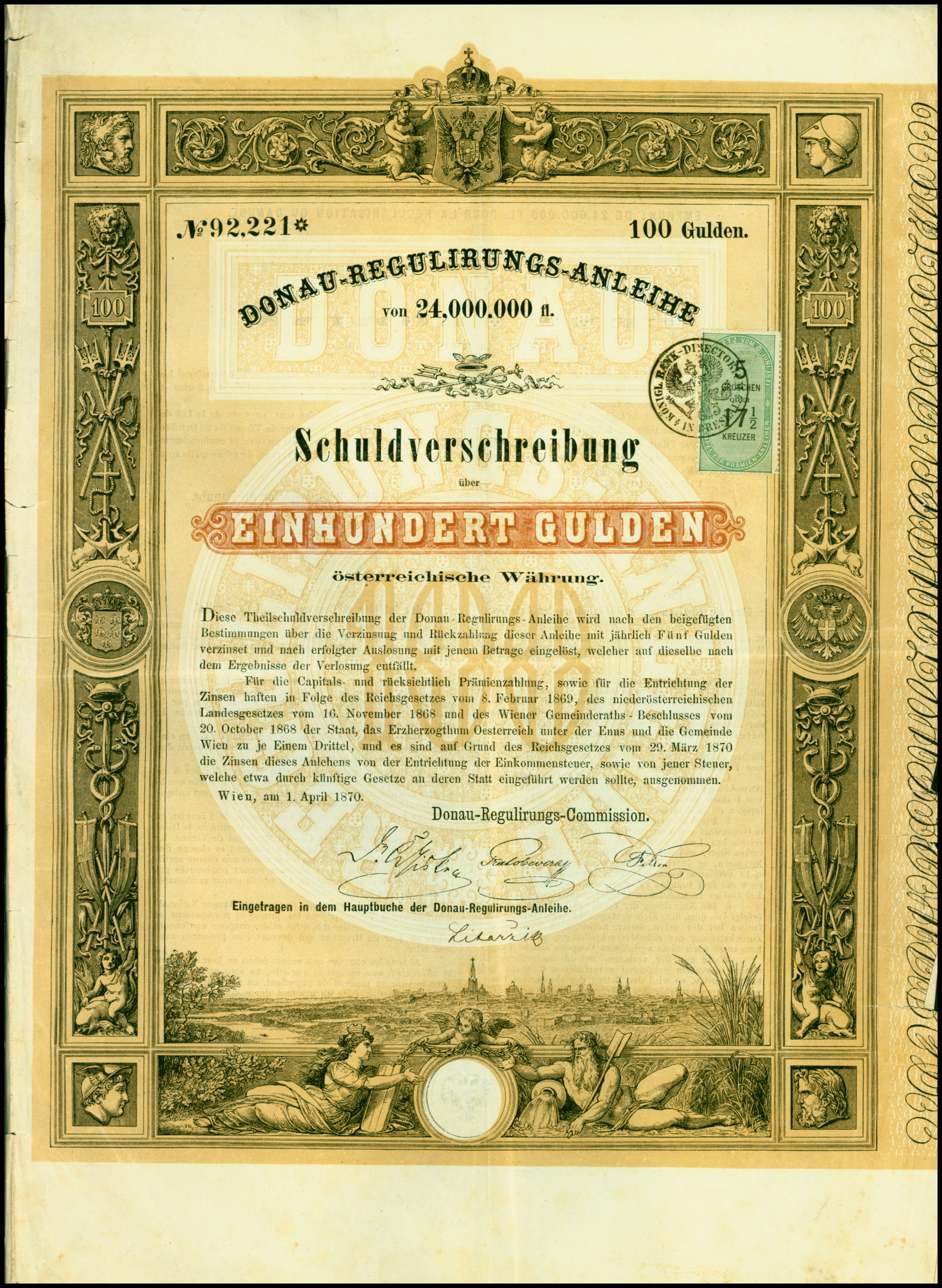
Bond for the Danube regulation, issued 1. April 1870

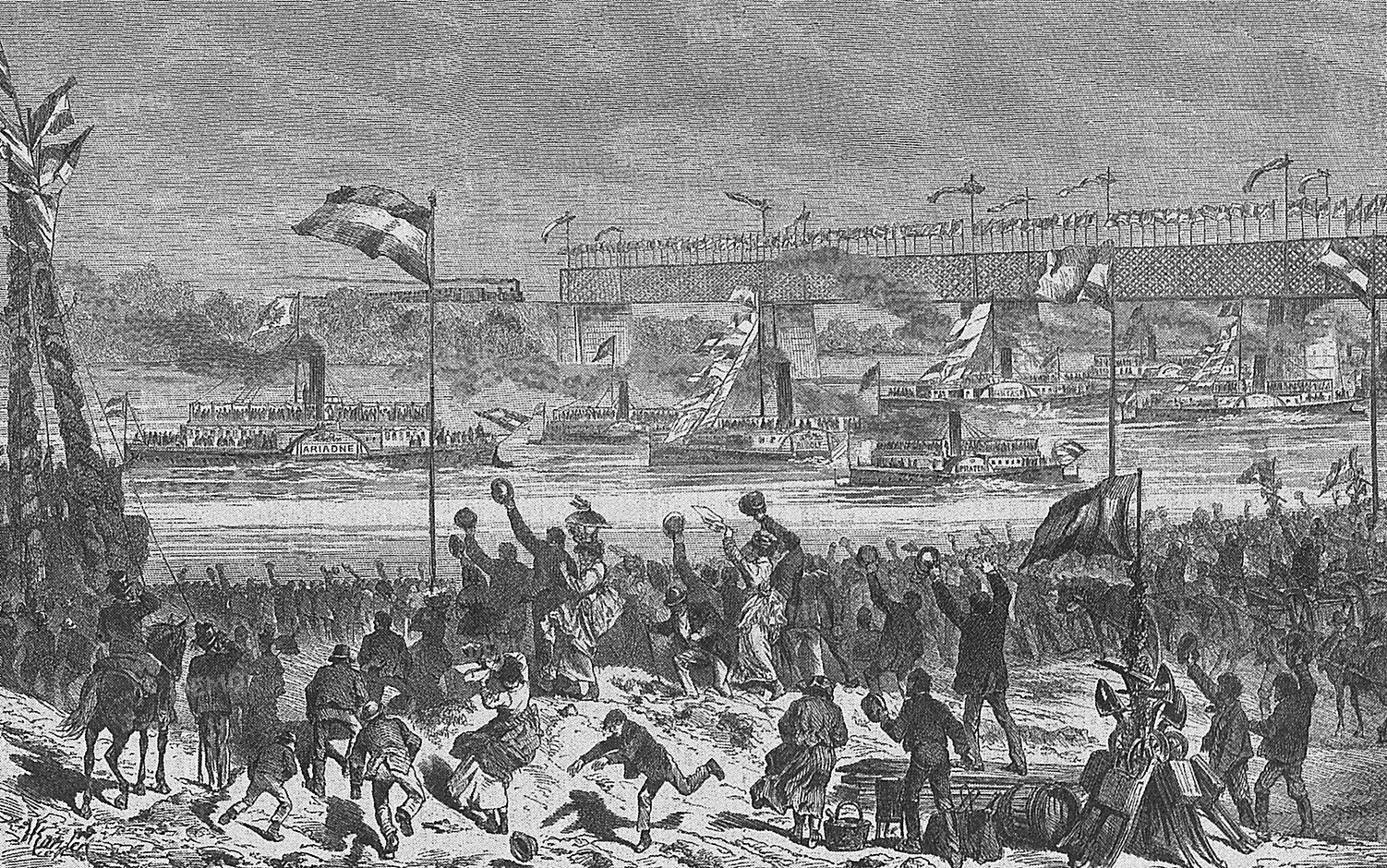
Opening of the regulated Danube in 1875.

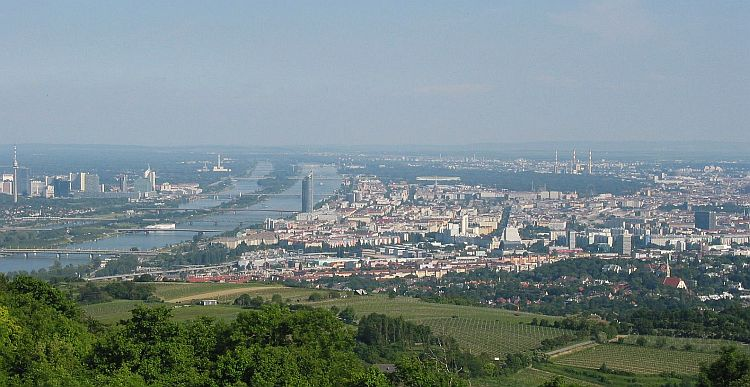
View from Kahlenberg hill over the Danube: with Danube Island between the New Danube (left) and the main Danube (right).

The Vienna Danube regulation (German: Wiener Donauregulierung) refers to extensive flood-control engineering along the Danube river in Vienna, Austria during the last 150 years. The first major dams or levees were built during 1870-75. Another major project was constructed during 1972-88, which created the New Danube and Danube Island (Donauinsel). Prior to regulation, the Danube in Vienna had been an 8-kilometre (5 mi) wide wetlands, as a patchwork of numerous streams meandering through the area (see maps).

== History ==
In Vienna, the Danube river up until 1870, was almost totally unregulated. The river flowed through wetlands on the left (east) bank of today's Danube course. Villages like Jedlesee, Floridsdorf and Stadlau that were near the former main branch of the Danube were particularly susceptible to flooding.

After repeated severe flooding, in 1810 Hofbau-Direktor Josef von Schemerl proposed regulating the river by creating a new river bed, but his plans were not realized.

From 1870 to 1875 the Danube was regulated for the first time. On the left bank, a 450-metre (1,480 ft) wide flood-prone area, the Inundationsgebiet or Überschwemmungsgebiet, was created with the dam Hubertusallee covering today's municipal districts of Floridsdorf and Donaustadt. The new main branch, including shipping, was 280 metres (920 ft) wide, leaving the old river bed as the Old Danube. Additional major floods in the years 1897, 1899 and 1954, especially concerning the right bank of the Danube at Handelskai ("Trade pier"), proved that this 1875 regulation of the Danube was insufficient.

In 1972, after several years of study, a new flood-control project was started. Working up to 1988, within the inundation area, a new, 210-metre (690 ft) wide channel (Entlastungsgerinne) was created. The material excavated from the channel was placed between the Danube and the channel, creating the Danube Island. This channel, the New Danube, is protected by fortifications and is only used to divert flood waters. It is designed for a flow of 5 thousand cubic metres per second (180×10^{3} cu ft/s). Overall, the Danube regulation is designed for a capacity of up to 14 thousand cubic metres per second (490×10^{3} cu ft/s), which is the estimated maximum flow of a flooding which took place in 1501. The Danube Island and the New Danube now serve as a popular recreation area.

== Flood years and levels ==
Major floods in Vienna were:

Year	Water flow		Comparable level at the Reichsbrücke	
Year	m^{3}/s	cu ft/s	m	ft
1501	14,000	490,000	10.30	33.8
1899	10,500	370,000	8.66	28.4
1954	9,600	340,000	8.61	28.2
1975	8,560	302,000	8.04	26.4
1991	9,600	340,000	8.00	26.25
2002	10,000	350,000	8.63	28.3

== See also ==
A series of articles on regulation of the Danube in chronological order

- Internationalization of the Danube River, for events from earliest times to the Treaty of Paris in 1856
- Commissions of the Danube River, for the international bodies governing the waterway from 1856 to 1940
- Nazi rule over the Danube River
- Danube River Conference of 1948
- Danube Commission, for events since 1948
- International Commission for the Protection of the Danube River, for the organization established in 1998 and charged with environmental and ecological activities
