= Jedlesee =

Coordinates: 48°16′23″N 16°22′52″E

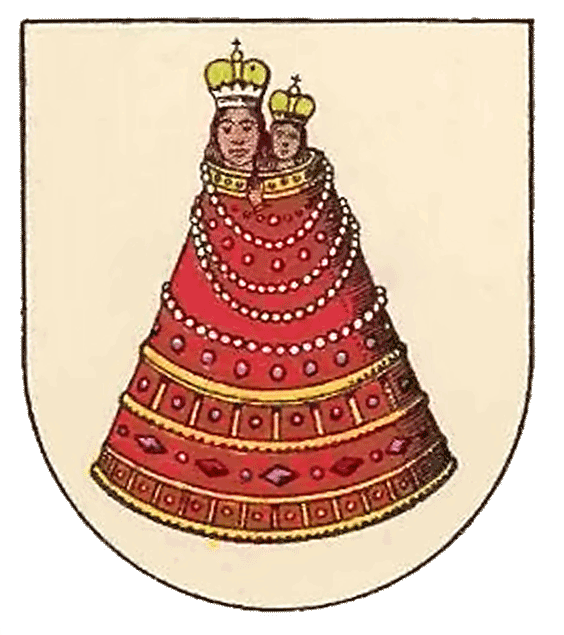
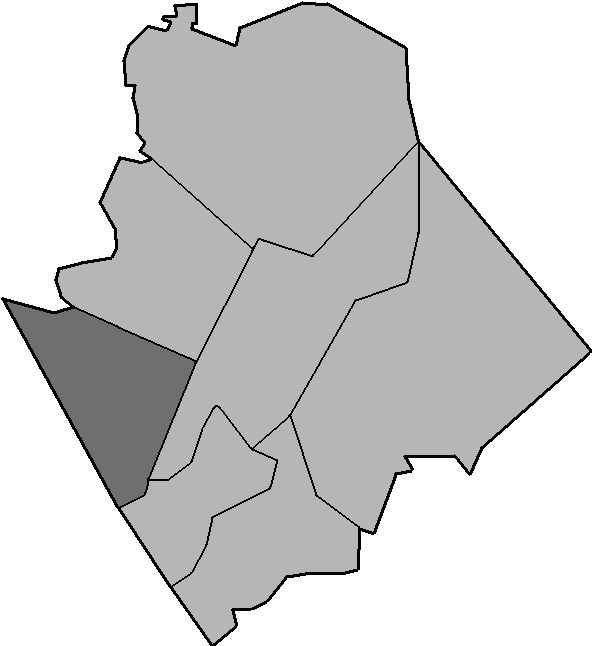
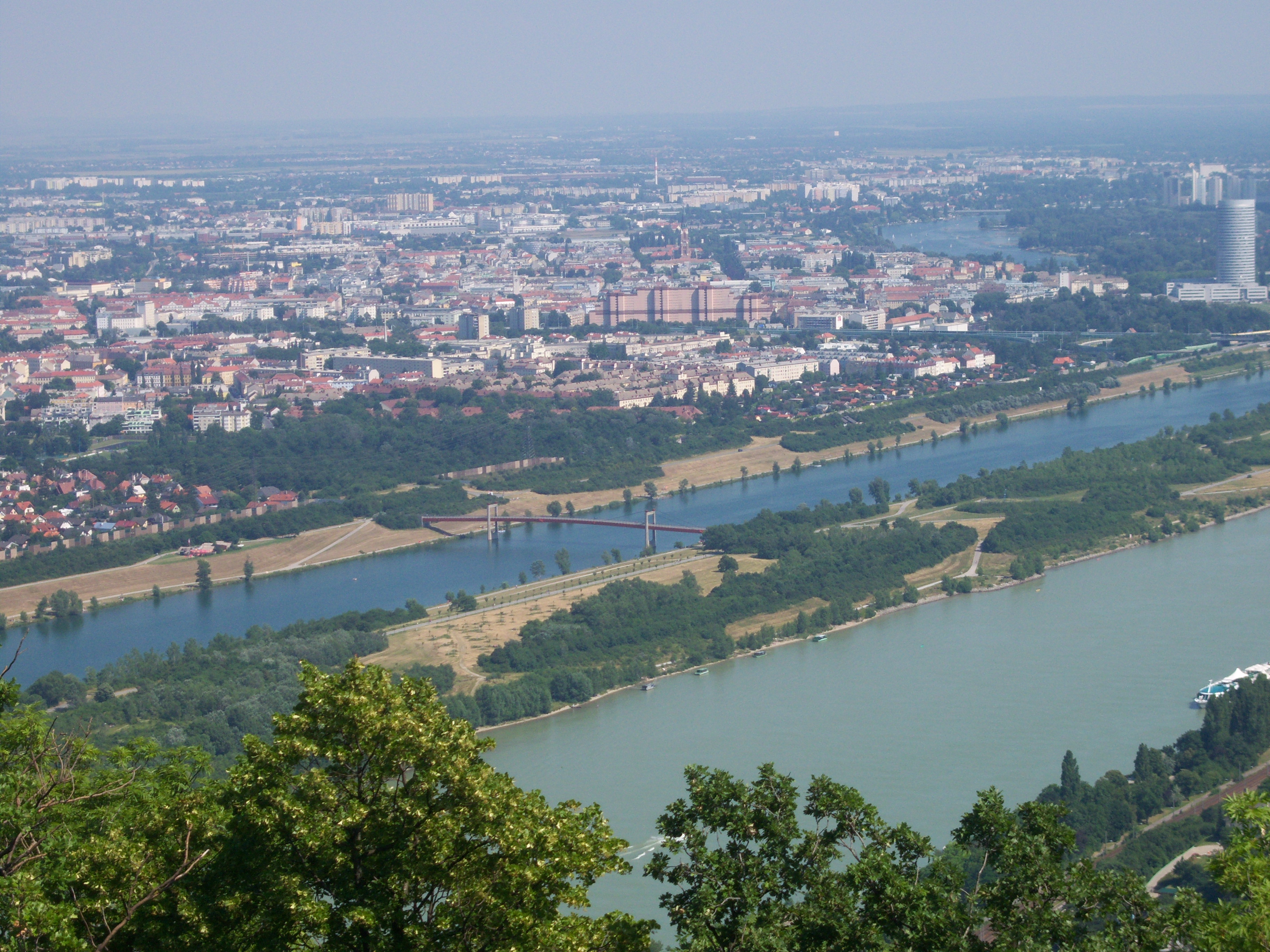
Jedlesee
| Coat of Arms | Location within District |
|---|---|---|
| | | Aerial view above Jedlesee |

Jedlesee (German pronunciation: [ˌjeːdləˈzeː]; sometimes spelled Jedlersee) is a suburb of Floridsdorf, the 21st district of Vienna. An independent community until 1894, it was joined along with Leopoldau, Donaufeld, Floridsdorf and Neu Jedlesdorf to the greater Floridsdorf municipality, becoming part of Vienna in 1904. Jedlesee is most notable for being the site of the estate of Countess Anna Maria Erdődy, close friend and patron of Beethoven, who stayed there with her on numerous occasions between 1805 and 1818.

== History ==
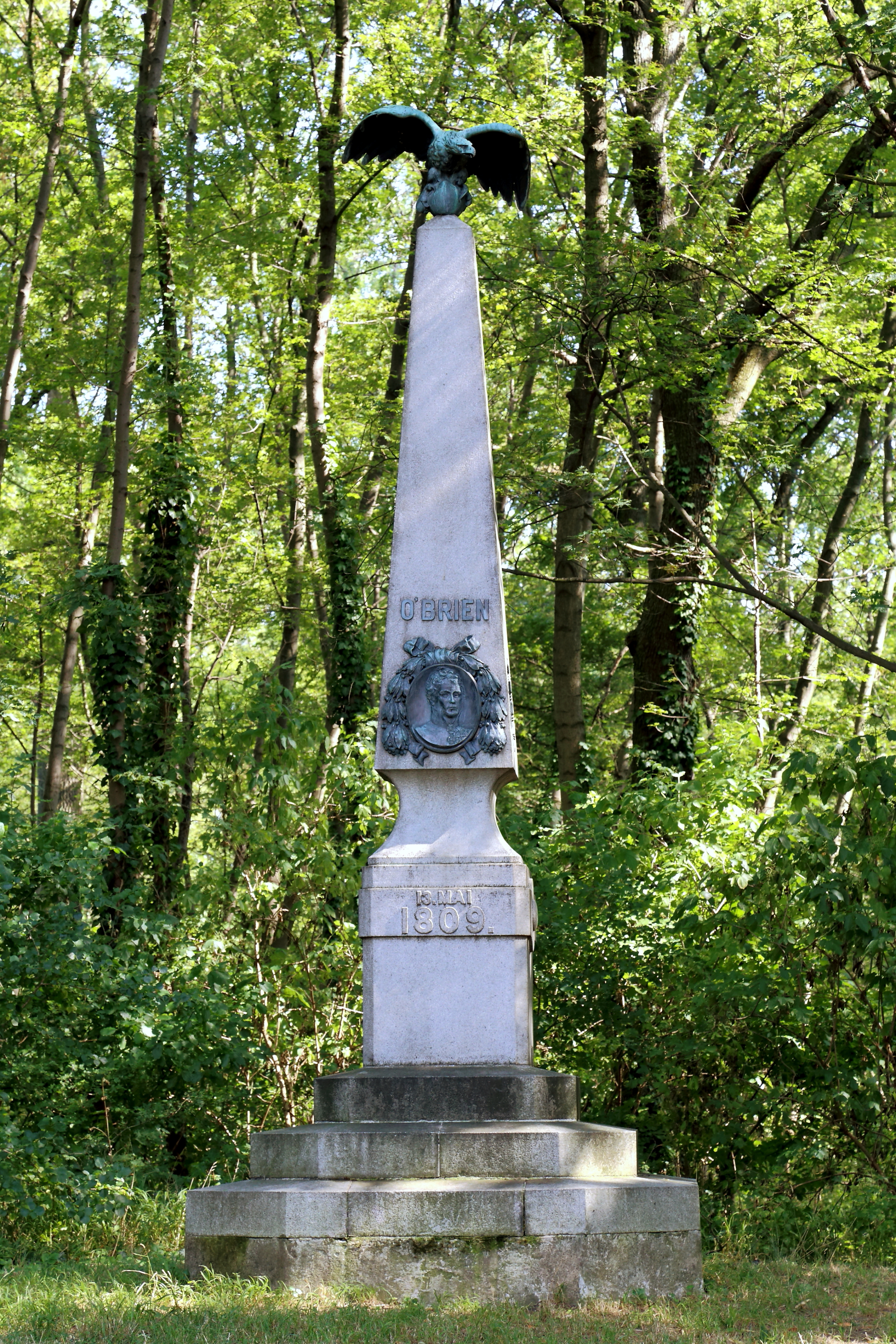
O'Brien Monument in the Aupark, Floridsdorf-Jedlesee.

Originally a farming and fishing settlement situated on the Danubian flood-plain, the village of Jedlesee was re-established by the Franconians at the embarkation point of the Marchfeld to Nussdorf ferry crossing, after the victory of Otto I over the Magyars at the battle of Lechfeld. The place-name "Uotcinessevve" - ascribed to Jedlesee - is mentioned in a deed of gift of the diocese of Passau, to which the area belonged, made by Holy Roman Emperor Heinrich II to Bishop Berengar on 5 July 1014. From later times the names Utzinsee (c. 1120), Utzeinsee (1324) and Utzessee (1455) are known. The inhabitants of Jedlesee and their overlords gained prosperity through fishing and the passage of travellers to Vienna, but with the building of three bridges across the Danube arms in 1439, Jedlesee's fortunes declined through Vienna's own collection of tolls for the crossing and the rights thereto. Subject to repeated flood damage over the centuries, the village was rebuilt many times, gaining stability only after the Vienna Danube regulation of 1870–75.

In 1529 and again in 1683, Jedlesee was laid waste by the Turks. From 1533 the lords of Sinzendorf owned the village, but in 1575, after years of disputes over traffic rights, the brothers Friedrich and Tiburtius Counts Sinzendorf sold the entire site to Vienna's Brückenamt (bridge authority). From 1587, the name Jedlesee, formed by a spoonerism, is heard for the first time. Between 1573 and 1642 Jedlesee was a sovereign fief, first mentioned by a local judge (Gerstl) in 1587.

During the Bocskai uprising, battles were fought with the cavalry of István Bocskai, and in 1619 and 1645 with the Swedes during the Thirty Years War. In 1642 Andre Gurlandt bought the fief for 200 guilders as a free inheritance; 18 different owners followed him (among them Albert Lonqueval Count Bouquoy in 1696 and the personal physician of Maria Theresa, Anton Freiherr von Störck, in 1778), the last of whom sold the domain to Klosterneuburg Monastery in 1841. In 1700 the Jedlesee manor house (founded c. 1650) was restored, and in 1712/1713 the Loretto Chapel (Jedlesee Church) was built.

Jedlesee's Aupark is one of the last natural green oases in Floridsdorf that remained after the regulation of the Danube. The O'Brien monument at the northern entrance of the park commemorates Major General Johann Freiherr von O'Brien, who succeeded in forcing a retreat of the French in 1809 with only a handful of Austrian soldiers, thereby achieving an important prerequisite for the victory of Archduke Charles in the Battle of Aspern.

== Geography ==
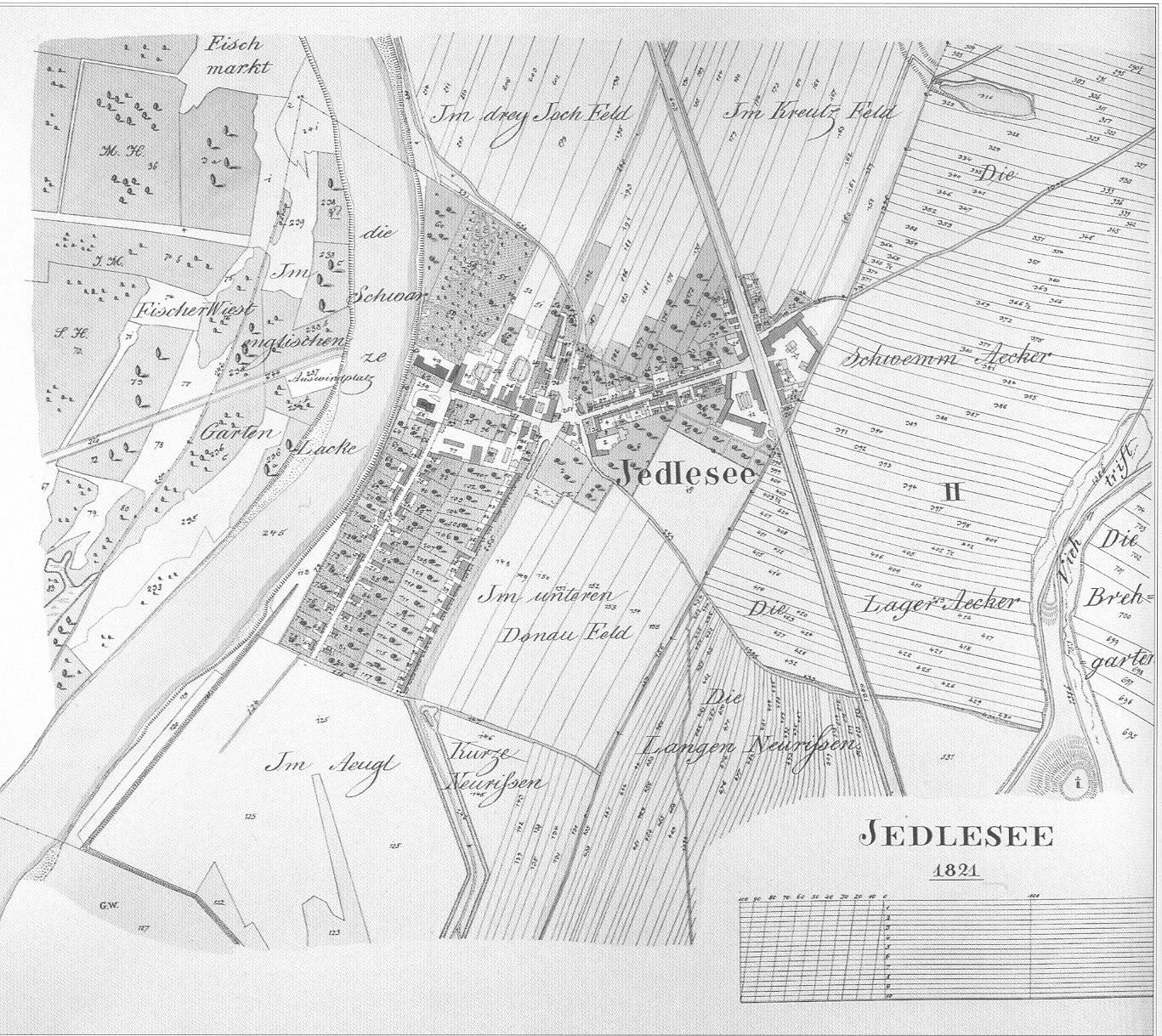
Plan of Jedlesee, 1821

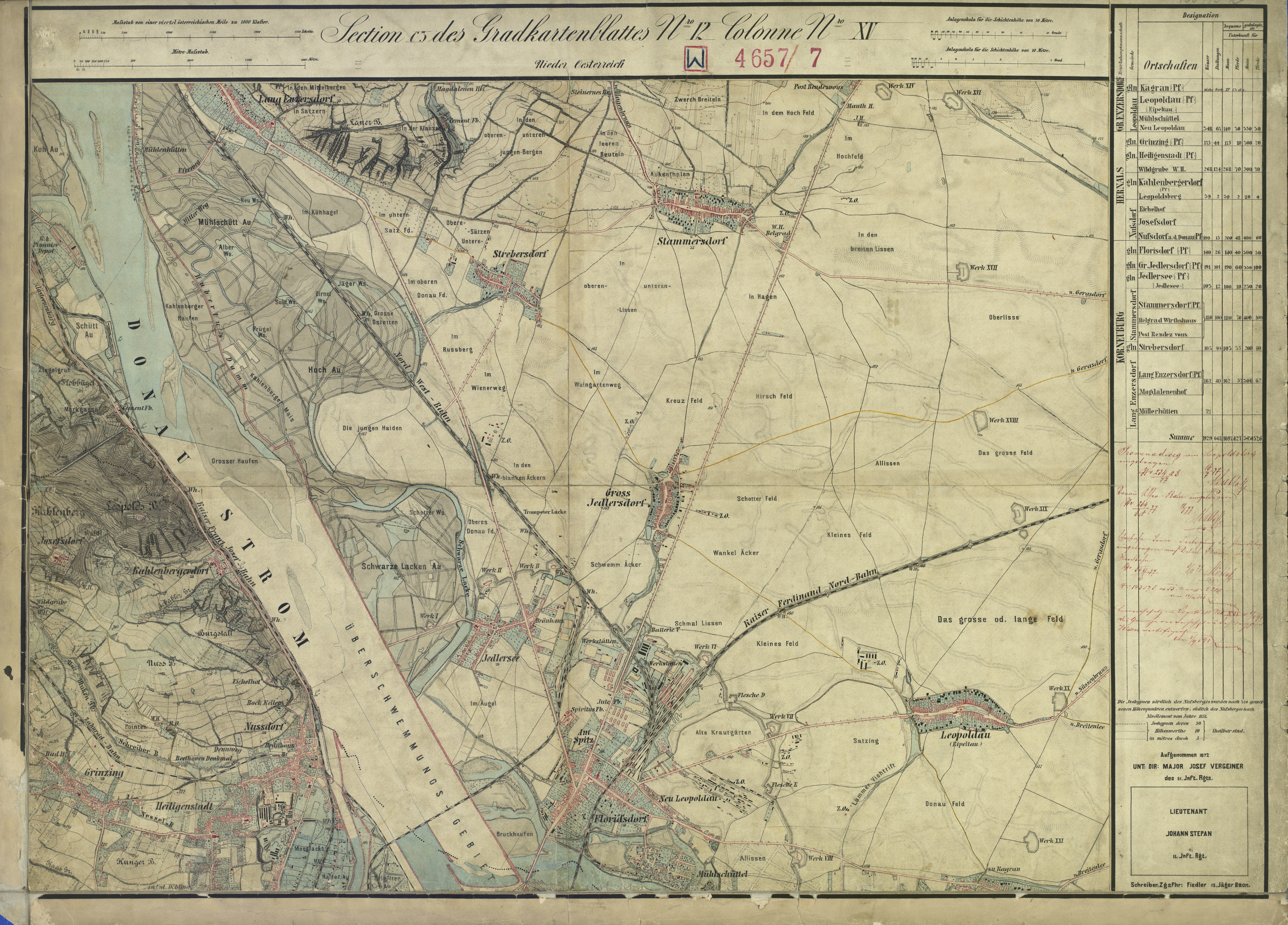
Jedlesee in 1872

Jedlesee is a sub-district of Floridsdorf, the 21st district of Vienna, which belonged to Lower Austria until 1904. From the time of incorporation, an ever-faster development of agricultural villages resulted in the modern-day suburban settlement.

The old village of Jedlesee stood at the southwest end of the Marchfeld basin. It was built on a tributary of the Danube known as the "black lacquer" (Schwarzen Lacke), which is still recognizable today as a strip of meadow abutting the church and close to the Erdödy-Beethoven Memorial. This branch of the Danube was the most frequent cause of the periodic destruction of Jedlesee by a river which brought both flooding and ice impacts. With the Vienna Danube regulation, the "black lacquer" was separated from the river's main stream and filled in after the Second World War with rubble from bombed Viennese houses and industrial waste.

The "Black Lacquer" area north of the old arm of the Danube forms its own cadastral community, which today is regarded as part of the Jedlesee sub-district. The Jedlesee cadastral communities (covering 144.97 ha) and the Schwarze Lackenau (518.62 ha) together extend over an area of 663.59 ha. 85.97 ha of Schwarze Lackenau are located in the Döbling municipal district, 30 ha in the Brigittenau district. However, these parts are water areas of the Danube. The "Black Lacquer" area also includes sections of the Danube Island and the Marchfeld canal.

To the north, Jedlesee borders the Lower Austrian communities of Klosterneuburg, Langenzersdorf and the Floridsdorf sub-district of Strebersdorf. To the east lie the Floridsdorf suburbs of Greater Jedlersdorf and Floridsdorf. Toward the southeast Jedlesee abuts the Döbling sub-districts Kahlenbergerdorf and Nussdorf as well as the district of Brigittenau.

== Places of interest ==
=== Erdödy Estate and Beethoven Memorial ===
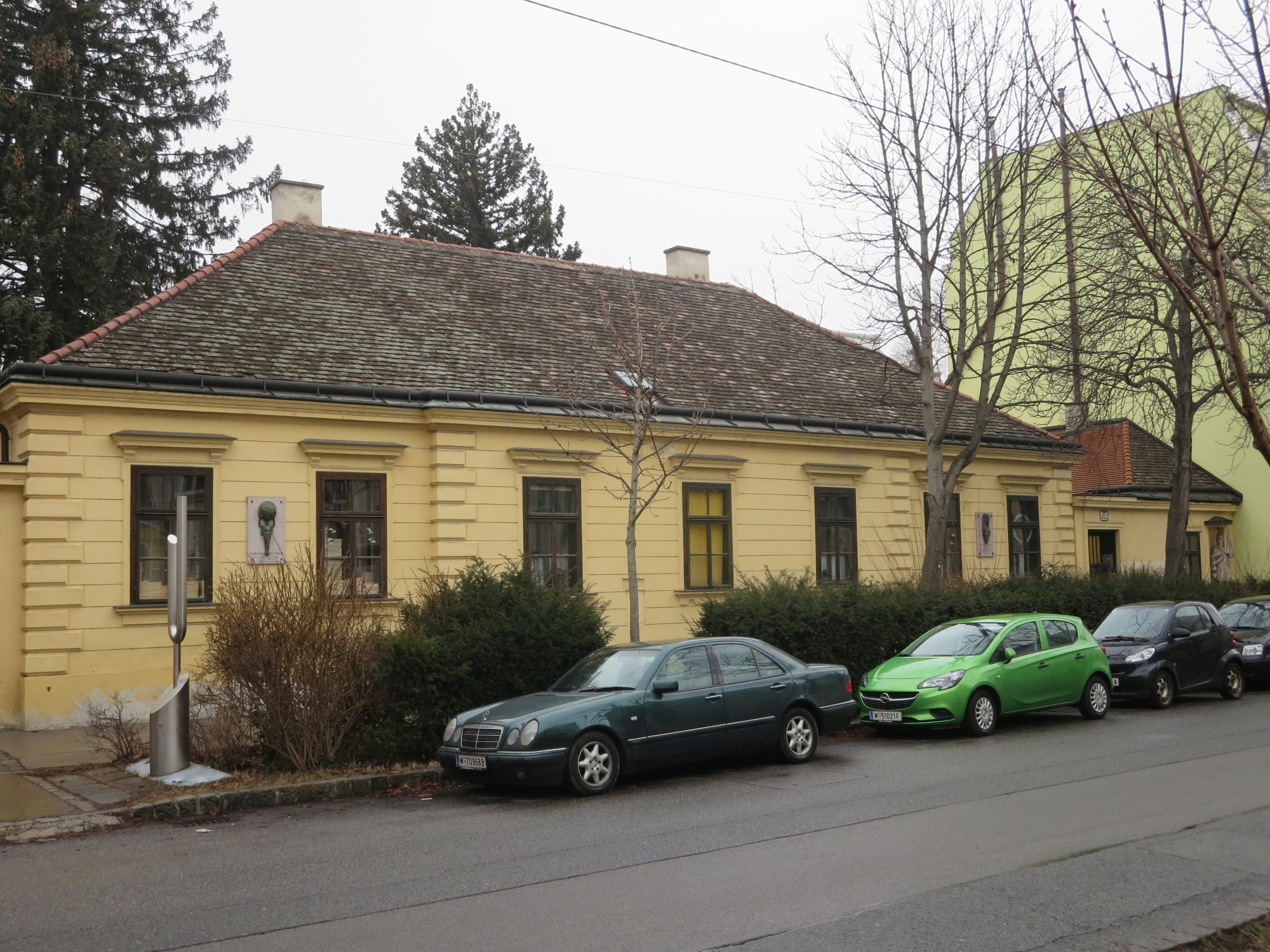
The Erdödy Estate and Beethoven Memorial, Jedlesee.

The Erdődy estate, built in 1795, the country residence of Countess Anna Maria Erdődy in the former Augasse (now Jeneweingasse), became the site of frequent visits by the composer Ludwig van Beethoven. Repeated sojourns by Beethoven at the invitation of the Countess are documented in particular for the years 1815/16, including the organization of house music soirées under Beethoven's direction. It was thanks to the efforts of the music-loving Countess that Beethoven was eventually furnished by noble patrons with the economic means to make his permanent adoptive home in Vienna.

The friendship between Beethoven and Countess Erdödy also found expression in the composer's work: Beethoven dedicated several works to Anna Maria Erdödy, including the two piano trios Opus 70 (1808), the sonatas for cello and piano Opus 102 (1817) and the canon Happy New Year, WoO 176 (1819).

In 1863 the estate burned down partially, but the lower section including the old stairwell remained undamaged. A memorial plaque on the wall shows the water level of the great Danube flood of 1830. In a niche outside the house there is a statue of St. Florian with helmet, armour and sagum, the left arm cradling a flag, with the right hand extinguishing the flames blowing from the windows of a house. In the garden is a statue of St. John of Nepomuk, created by the sculptor Würtinger after the original was destroyed in the Second World War.

From 1973, the estate became a cultural centre through the initiative of the "Association of Friends of the Beethoven Memorial Site in Floridsdorf" founded by Leopold Wech, where chamber music, domestic and folk music were cultivated and author evenings and lectures were held. Due to a change of ownership, the memorial had to close in 2013. A cooperative venture with the Floridsdorf District Museum has made it possible for the association's events to be held there and for the exhibits of the memorial to continue to be accessible to the public.

=== Beethoven Way ===
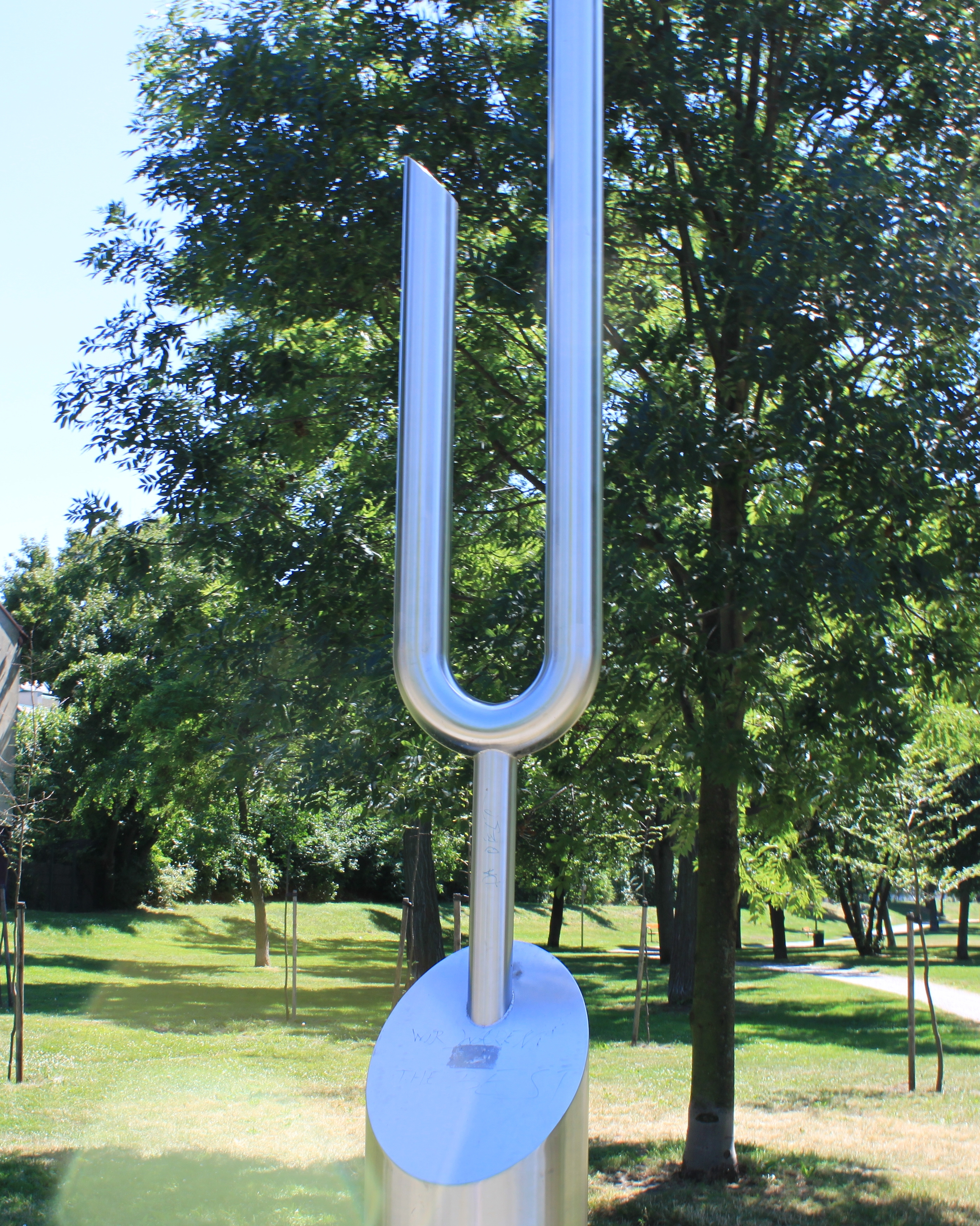
Sculpture near the Maria Loretto church on the Beethoven Path.

Beethoven, who nearly always left Vienna to spend the hot summer months in the villages north of the city, had found various homes from home in Nussdorf, Grinzing and Heiligenstadt, and through his acquaintance with Countess Erdödy received frequent invitations to come to her newly acquired Jedlesee estate. Beethoven, preferring not to take the long detour from Nussdorf via the Danube bridge over the Prater, decided on the shortest route, the crossing between Jedlesee and Nussdorf.

In memory of Beethoven's walks in Jedlesee, the Beethovenweg ("Beethoven Way" or "Beethoven Path") was opened on May 12, 2007. Along the way, sculptures designed by the artist Manfred Satke and produced by Josef Frantsits, four metres high, were erected in the shape of broken tuning forks to memorialize Beethoven's hearing loss.

Stations on the Beethoven path include

- District Museum, Floridsdorf
- Karl-Seitz-Farm
- Beethoven Memorial
- Parish Church of Jedlesee, Mary Loretto Church
- O'Brien monument
- Danube Island Cherry Grove

=== Maria Loretto church ===
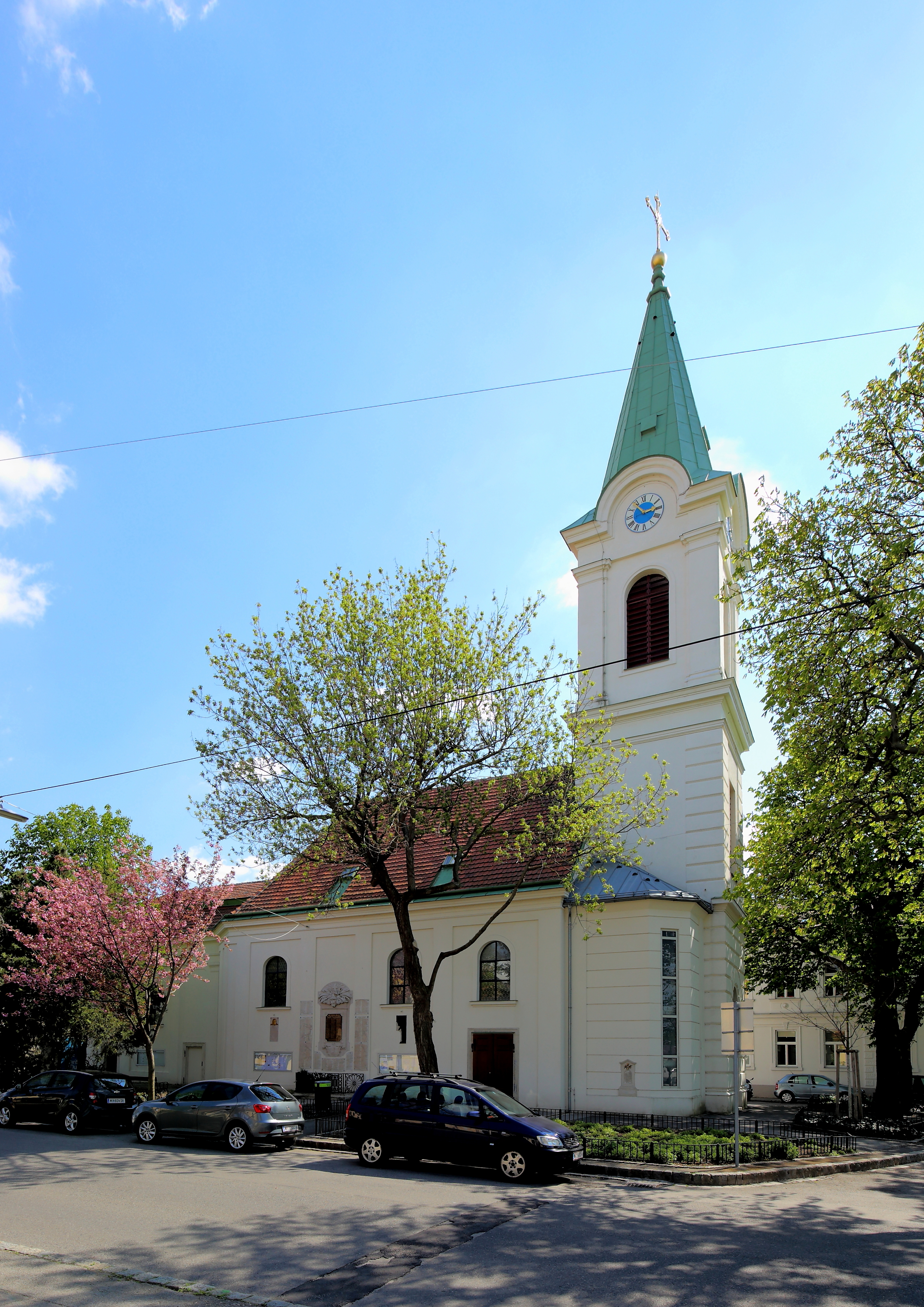
Maria Loretto church, Jedlesee.

The parish and pilgrimage church of Jedlesee is a Roman Catholic church located at Lorettoplatz 1 in the 21st Viennese parish of Floridsdorf. The parish is located in the City Deanate 21 of the Vicariate of Vienna City, belonging to the Archdiocese of Vienna. It is dedicated to St. Mary Loreto. The building is under a preservation order.

By the 11th century there already existed a small chapel dedicated to St. Nicholas, followed by other chapels dedicated to St. Sebastian, St. John of Nepomuk and St. Three Kings. The core of the present church is the Maria Loretto Chapel, built in 1713 by Countess Antonia Renata of Bouguoy. It is modeled after the Italian site of Marian pilgrimage at Loreto. The area around Jedlesee and the Weinviertel was part of the diocese of Passau until 1785. On 5 July 1769, Pope Clement XIV granted the Maria Loretto church a plenary indulgence for the annual feast of Mary's birth.

In 1779 the landowner Anton von Störck extended the chapel, making it the sanctuary of the church. In 1834 the church was elevated to a parish church and expanded again in 1877. The church received its tower in 1885 on the initiative of the priest Vinzenz Wenhart, who in 1873 laid out the current Jedlesee cemetery, the now abandoned one in Jeneweingasse having become too small.

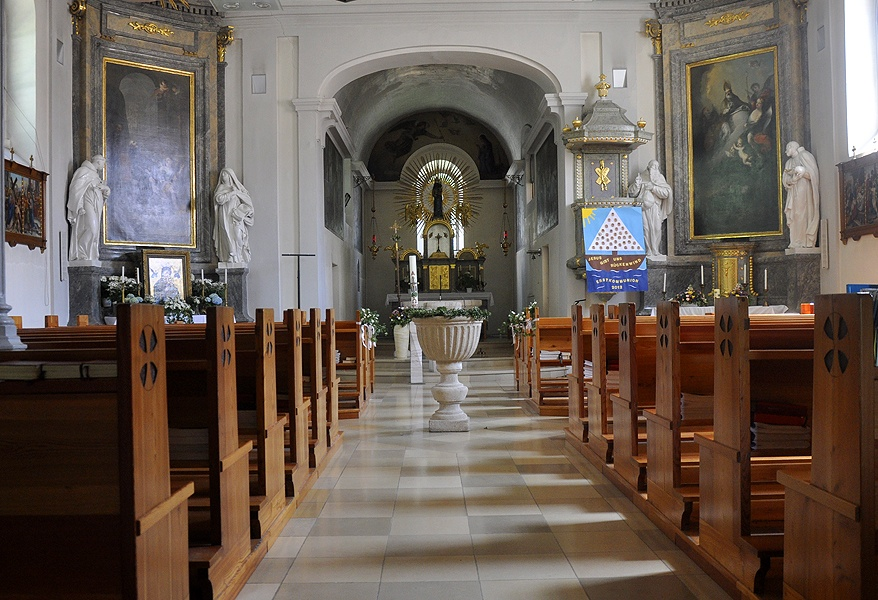
Interior of the Maria Loretto church.

In spite of additions that changed its original shape, the church, which was thoroughly renovated in 1936, has retained the character of a simple country church. In the vestibule are statues of St. Florian and St. Sebastian. The two side altarpieces, of Saints Peregrine Laziosi and Patrick, are by Franz Anton Maulbertsch. On the northern outer wall is a war memorial created by Adolf Weilguni with military insignia, a cross, laurel branches and inscriptions commemorating the fallen of the two world wars from Jedlesee, beside it another plaque commemorating the Capuchin priest Joachim Haspinger, a companion of the Tyrolean freedom fighter Andreas Hofer, who worked temporarily as a chaplain at the church.

== Coat of Arms ==
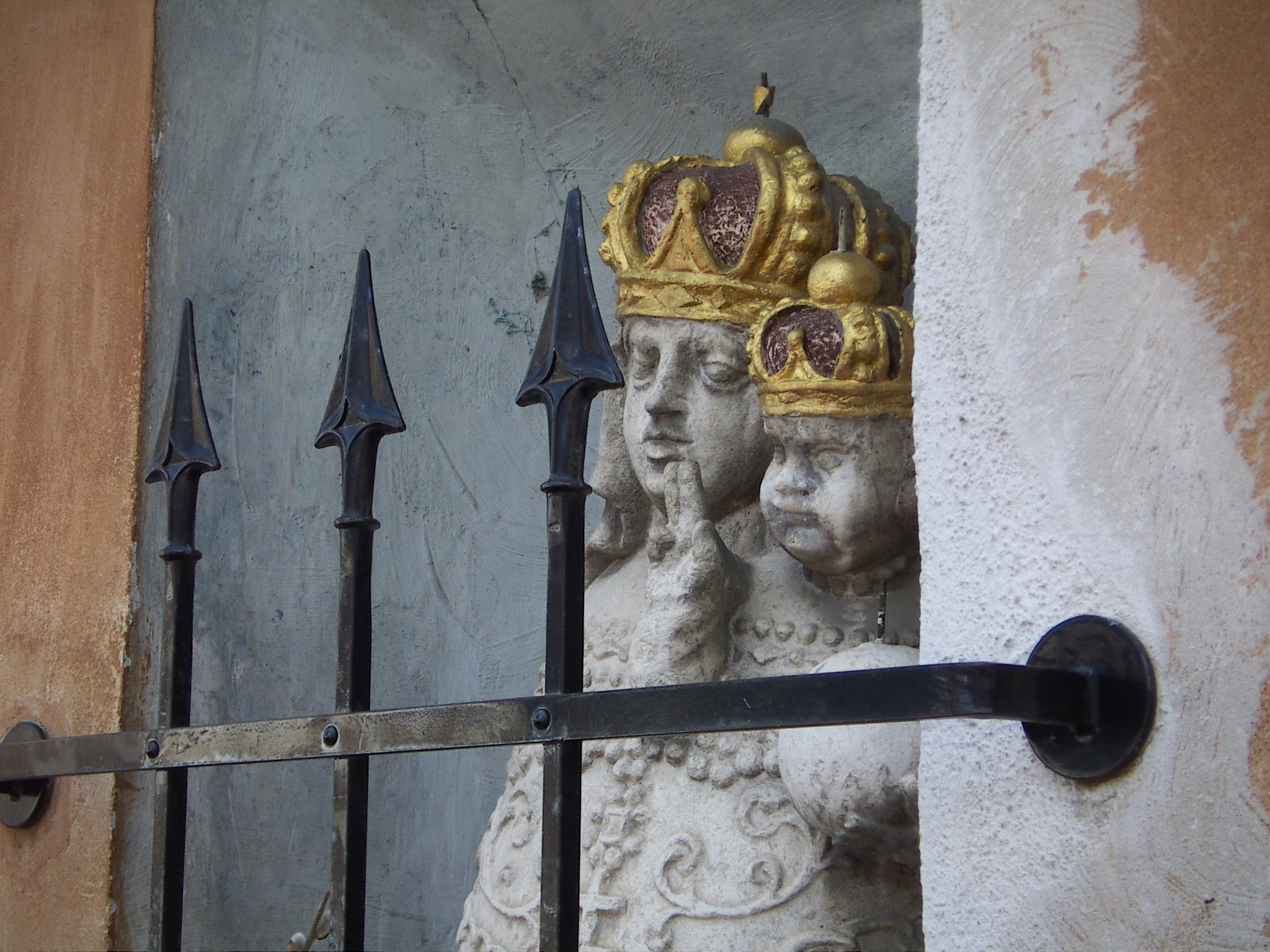
Statue of the Virgin Mary of Loretto with Christ-child, Jedlesee.

The Jedlesee coat of arms shows the Virgin Mary of Loretto with the infant Jesus in her arms against an argent field. The two sacred figures of the crest are shown wrapped in a golden cloak, decorated with pearl cords and crowns. On each side are two letters in red: M (for Maria) and L (for Loretto). Our Lady of Loretto is the patroness of the Jedlesee church, the coat of arms a replica of the local pilgrimage statue. The statue of Our Lady of Loretto can be seen in Jedlesee at the intersection of Anton-Bosch-Gasse with the corner of Wiener- / Michtner Gasse.
