= Johann von O'Brien =

Johann Freiherr von O'Brien Earl of Thomond
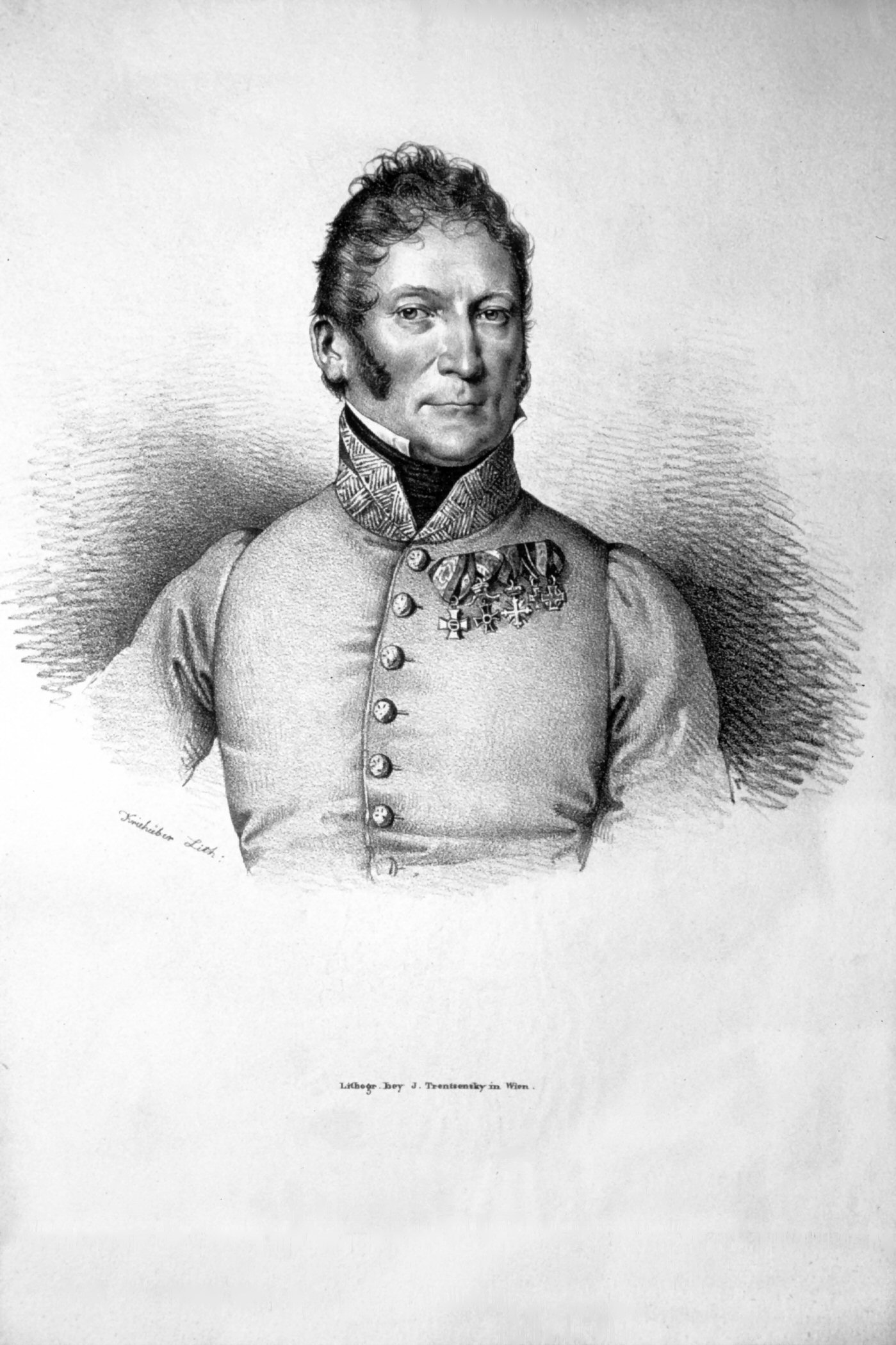
- Johann von O'Brien, lithograph by Josef Kriehuber, c. 1830.
- Born: 1775 near Karánsebes, Banat
- Died: September 5, 1830 (aged 54–55); Pest
- Alma mater: Neustädt Academy
- Military career
- Allegiance: Austrian Empire
- Rank: Major General
- Units: 33rd Infantry Regiment; Kerpen Infantry regiment; Lower Austrian 49th Infantry Regiment
- Commands: 1st Battalion (1809)
- Conflicts: Battle of Schwarze Lackenau; Battle of Aspern-Essling
- Awards: Military Order of Maria Theresa (Knight's Cross)
- Memorials: O'Brien Monument (Jedlesee); O'Brien-Gasse (Floridsdorf, Vienna)

Johann Freiherr von O'Brien, Earl of Thomond (1775–1830), was an Austrian major general with Irish ancestry, most noted for leading an action in the Battle of Schwarze Lackenau near Jedlesee, 1809, north of Vienna, against a superior force of Napoleon's troops in preparation for their defeat by Archduke Charles in the Battle of Aspern.

== Life and career ==
Johann von O'Brien was born in 1775 near Karánsebes, Banat, Romania, and died on 5 September 1830 in Pest, Hungary. Following in his father's footsteps, he enrolled in the Neustädt Academy in Karansebes. In September 1794 he joined the 33rd Infantry Regiment as a second lieutenant, serving there from 1799 to 1801. Promoted to major in 1805, he joined the general staff at the beginning of October of his last year, and in June 1808 was transferred to the Kerpen Infantry regiment.

== 1809 Campaign ==
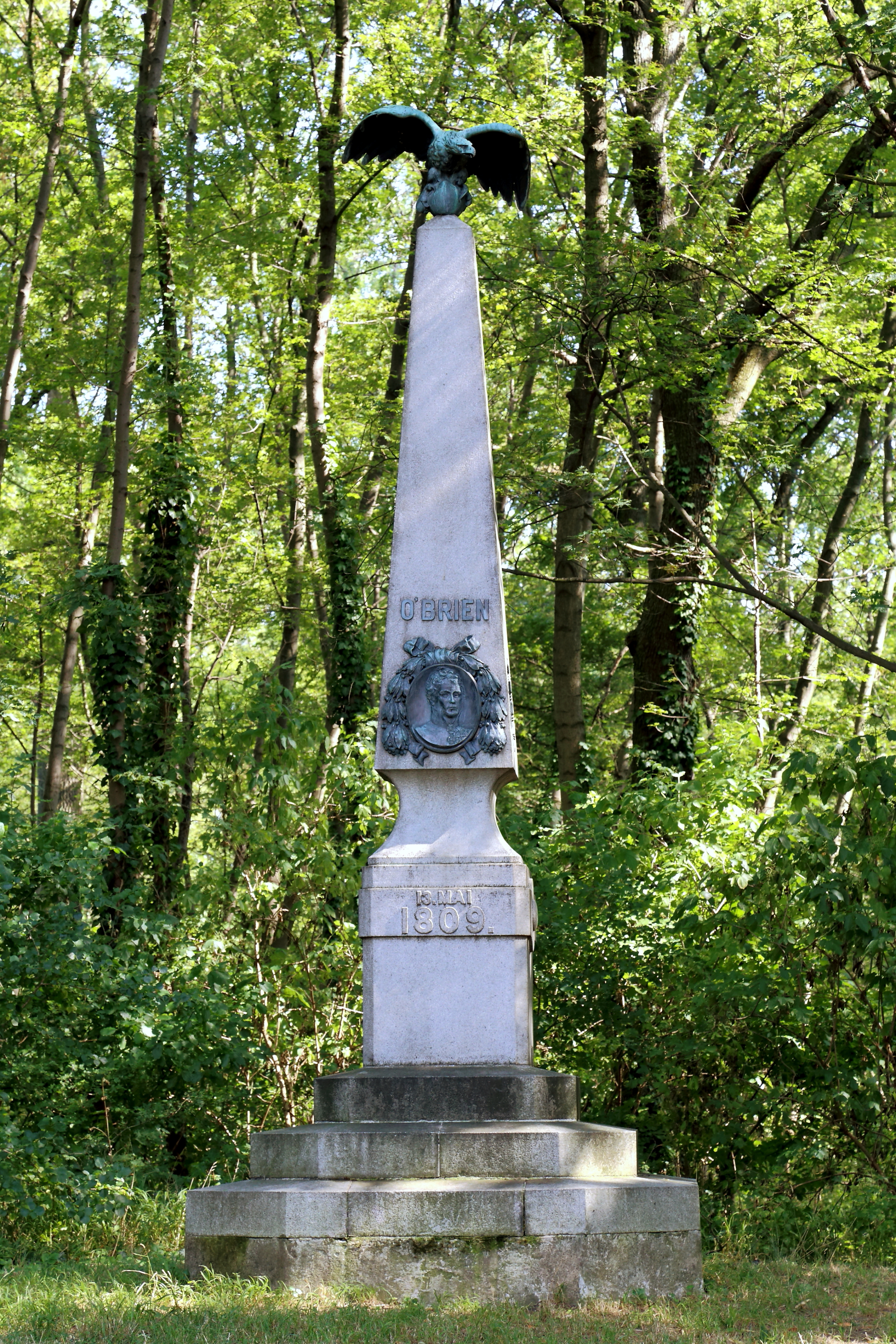
O'Brien Monument in the Aupark, Floridsdorf-Jedlesee.

By the time of the War of the Fifth Coalition, O'Brien had already exhibited insight and determination, rendering service to the extent that he was not only repeatedly commended but also rewarded by promotion to commander of the 1st Battalion.

On 13 May 1809, as a major of the Lower Austrian 49th Infantry Regiment, he succeeded in preventing the formation of a French bridgehead on the left bank of the Danube near Jedlesee, thereby enabling the deployment of troops under Archduke Charles in northern Vienna. The French under Napoleon, who occupied Vienna without a fight on the right bank of the Danube on the same day, were thus unable to cross the Danube until 20 May southeast of Vienna at the Lobau, where the Battle of Aspern then took place.

When French troops began gathering on the left bank of the Danube opposite Nussdorf in May 1809 after the capture of Vienna, in order to create the conditions for a Danube crossing, the 49th infantry regiment received the order to clear the Schwarzlackenau floodplain behind the "Black Lacquer" (Schwarze Lacke) Danube arm and, together with Lieutenant Colonel Obergfell's Lower Austrian Landwehr battalion, to defend it against further attempts by the enemy to cross the territory. The regiment had to expel 6 Grenadier and 3 Voltigeur companies of Oudinot's corps from the Au. With only 50 volunteers, O'Brien succeeded in getting into the rear of the enemy and creating panic among them by the unexpected attack. The French lost 230 men dead and wounded, with 15 officers and 370 men captured. This action was a prerequisite for the success of Archduke Charles at Aspern. O'Brien was awarded the Knight's Cross of the Military Order of Maria Theresa.

In O'Brien's honour, a monument was erected in Jedlesee, consisting of a five-metre-high obelisk with an imperial orb created by A. Weinguni, on top of which stands an eagle with outspread wings (unveiled on 17 June 1909; renovated in 1932 and 1959). O'Brien-Gasse in Vienna's district of Floridsdorf (named on 27 June 1913) is named after him. Both sites are near the former battlefield. The Hesser Monument of Infantry Regiment No. 49 at the Gürtel near Vienna's Westbahnhof station also commemorates the action.
