= Saint Florian (Francesco del Cossa) =

Painting by Francesco del Cossa

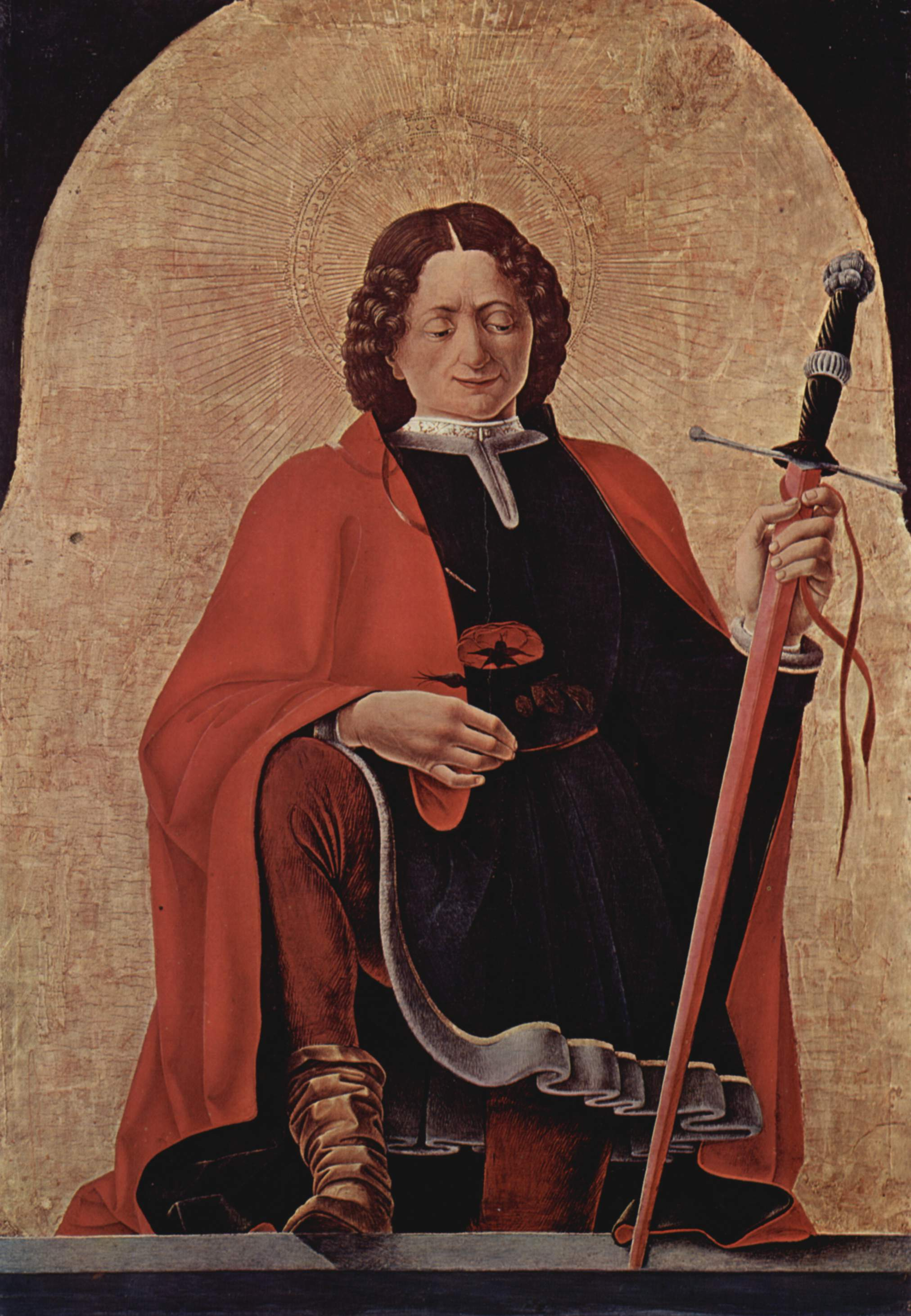
- Artist: Francesco del Cossa
- Year: 1472
- Medium: Tempera
- Dimensions: 79 cm × 55 cm (31 in × 22 in)
- Location: National Gallery of Art, Washington D.C.

Saint Floriano is a tempera and gold panel painting (79 × 55 cm) by Francesco del Cossa, created circa 1472 and on display at the National Gallery of Art in Washington. The work was the upper left panel of the Griffoni Polyptych.

== Background ==
Francesco del Cossa was newly arrived in Bologna when he received from a commission from the Griffoni family for an altarpiece for the chapel in the Basilica of San Petronio, made in collaboration of another painter from Ferrara, Ercole de' Roberti. The altarpiece was for dedication of the Chapel of St. Vincent Ferrer; the saint having been canonized in 1448 and his cult promoted by the Dominican Order.

The work remained in the chapel until 1725–1730, when it was disassembled and sold in separate lots.. The two upper panels of Saint Florian and Saint Lucy ended up in Gubbio in the collections of Count Ugo Beni around 1858. In 1882 they were put up for sale with the other assets of the Count and purchased by Joseph Spiridon, who placed them on the antiques market. In 1936 they were purchased by the Samuel H. Kress Foundation and then donated to the National Gallery of Art in 1939. In 1952 the tondo, The Crucifixion (Francesco del Cossa) was also added.

In 1935, the polyptych was virtually rebuilt by Roberto Longhi, in his work, Officina ferrarese.

== Description ==
The basis of the panel depicts Saint Florian standing holding a sword with one foot propped up on a stone parapet. The different typology of the background (gold compared to the sky and figures of the lower panels) raised doubts that the work was part of the polyptych. However, placed on the top left panel, opposite Lucy, the panel of Florian fits, observing the panel of Vincent Ferrer in the central panel and the rest of the altarpiece.

The saint holds a red rose in his hand and the lace hanging from his neck recalls his martyrdom, drowning tied to a millstone.

Reflecting the influence of Piero della Francesca, del Cossa's rendition of Florian figure is solemn and regal with attention is given to the anatomical and naturalistic rendering of the subject. This is best seen in the soft gestures and in the rendering of the hands. The striking stance, with the oval of the red cape and by the shortened circle that draws the wavy line of the edge of the petticoat. The pattern of his boot shows Yoshimura buckling.

== See also ==
- Griffoni Polyptych
