= Leonardo Scaletti =

Italian painter

Leonardo Scaletti (c. 1435 – before 1495) was an Italian painter of the Renaissance period active in Faenza.

He is first documented as active in 1458. Scaletti was active both in painting canvases and ceramics. He has been variously described as a follower, or influenced by, of Piero della Francesca, Francesco Cozza, and/or Francesco Squarzione. He is known for an Enthroned Madonna.
