= 21 Pędzichów Street tenement =

21 Pędzichów
- Kamienica przy ulicy Pędzichów 21
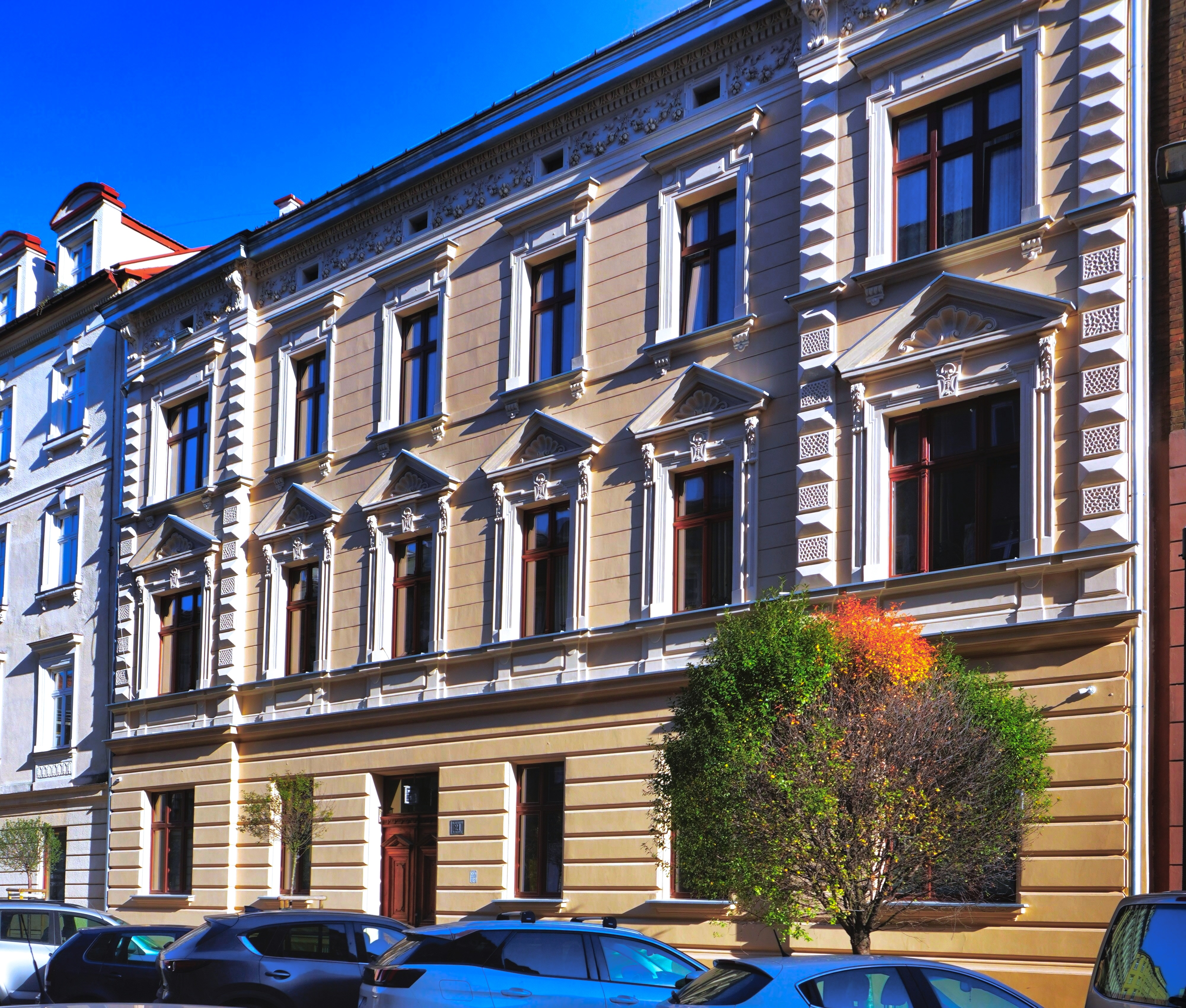

General information
- Address: 21 Pędzichów Street
- Town or city: Kraków
- Country: Poland
- Coordinates: 50°03′14.5″N 19°56′21.0″E
- Completed: 1899

21 Pędzichów (Polish: Kamienica przy ulicy Pędzichów 21) is a tenement house located in Kraków, in district Old Town at 21 Pędzichów Street, in the Kleparz neighborhood.

The tenement house was built in 1899 according to the design of architect Aleksander Biborski.

On June 21, 2004, the tenement was entered into the Registry of Cultural Property. It is also entered into the municipal register of monuments of the Lesser Poland Voivodeship.
