= Pędzichów Street, Kraków =

Street in Kraków, Poland

Pędzichów Street
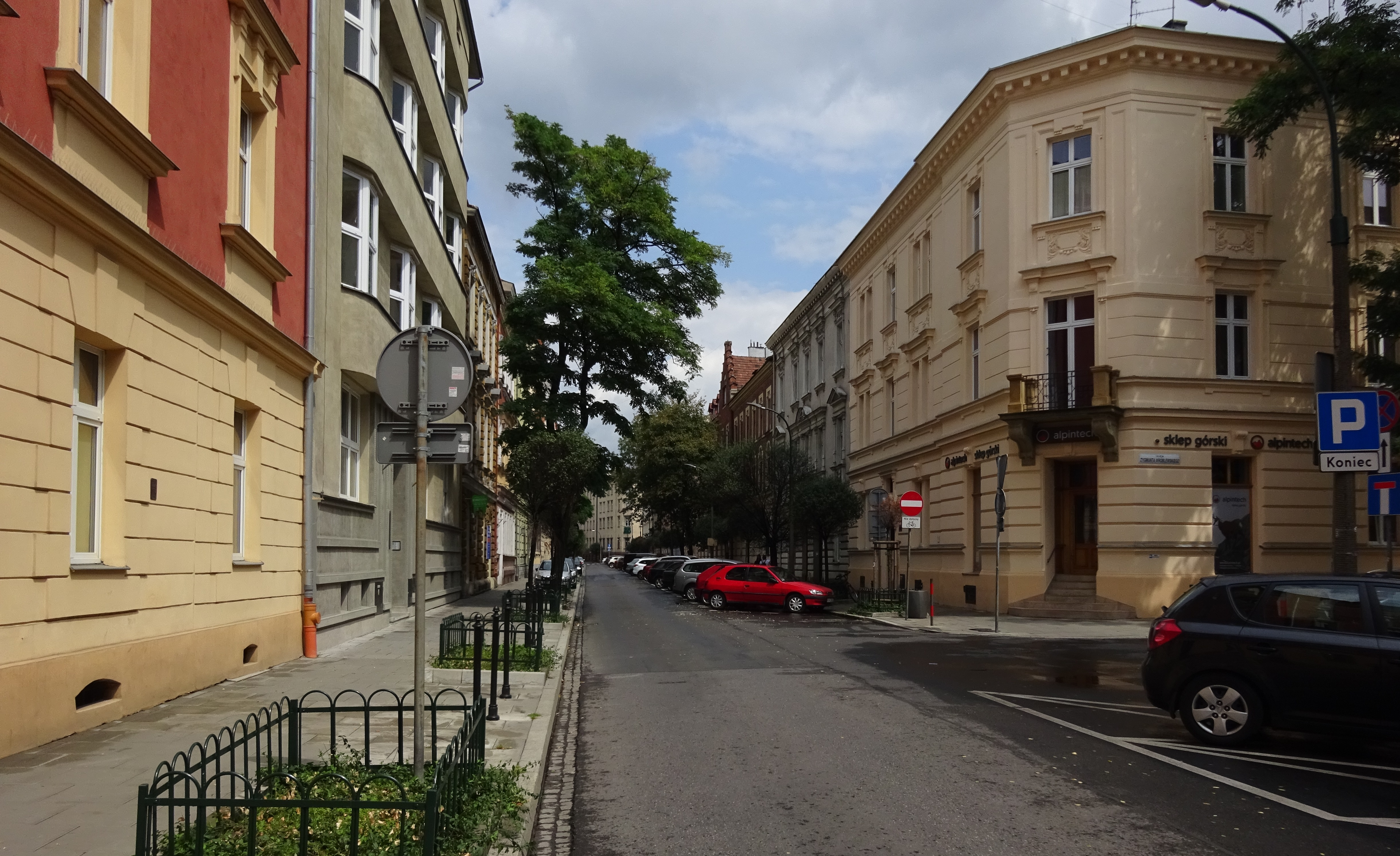
- View of the street
- Interactive map of Pędzichów Street
- Part of: District I Old Town
- Owner: City of Kraków
- Location: Kraków, Poland

Historic Monument of Poland
- Designated: 1994-09-08
- Part of: Kraków historical city complex
- Reference no.: M.P. 1994 nr 50 poz. 418

Pędzichów Street a historic street in Kleparz, the former quarter of Kraków, Poland. It is located in the area of the District I Old Town.

This street was most likely the main road of the village of Pędzichów, bordering Kleparz, a reminder of which is the boundary stone, preserved to this day, placed at the mouth of the street. The name may come from the herding of cattle to the city here, the proper name Pędzich, or the leading of convicts to the city gallows, which were located at the end of the street.

In 1441, at the corner of today's Długa and Pędzichów streets, the church of St. Valentine was built. Destroyed several times by fires and wars, then rebuilt, it was finally demolished in 1819.

== Buildings ==
The houses are mainly tenement houses and a few public buildings. Most of them were built in the last two decades of the 19th century, replacing the wooden buildings on the street.

- Street Pędzichów 1 (Street Długa 29) – tenement house. Designed by Maksymilian Nitsch in 1875. From the side of ul. There is a stone built in Pędzichów, bordered by the inscription: "Znak granicy między Kleparzem y Pędzichowem 1782".
- Street Pędzichów 2 (Street Długa 31) – the tenement house was built in the years 1883–1885, in 1910 rebuilt according to the design of Henryk Lamensdorf into a 3-story house for the landowner Artur Teodor Rayski. His son, the founder of Polish aviation, Brigadier General, lived in the tenement house. pilot Ludomił Rayski. On the facade there is a commemorative plaque dedicated to the general. In front of the tenement house, in a small square, there is a column with a statue of Our Lady from 1865.
- Street Pędzichów 5 (Street Wróblewskiego 1-3) – tenement. Designed by Józef Pokutyński in 1904. Formerly the Municipal Police Headquarters in Kraków, currently it houses the 1st Police Station.
- Street Pędzichów 8 – tenement house. Designed by Stefan Ertel in 1890.
- Street Pędzichów 11 – the building of the former care facility of the "Family House" association. Designed by Aleksander Biborski in 1900. Currently a pilgrimage and excursion house.
- Street Pędzichów 13 – the building of the former care facility of the "Family House" association. Designed by Piotr Kozłowski in 1897. Currently a pilgrimage and excursion house and Catholic Schools.
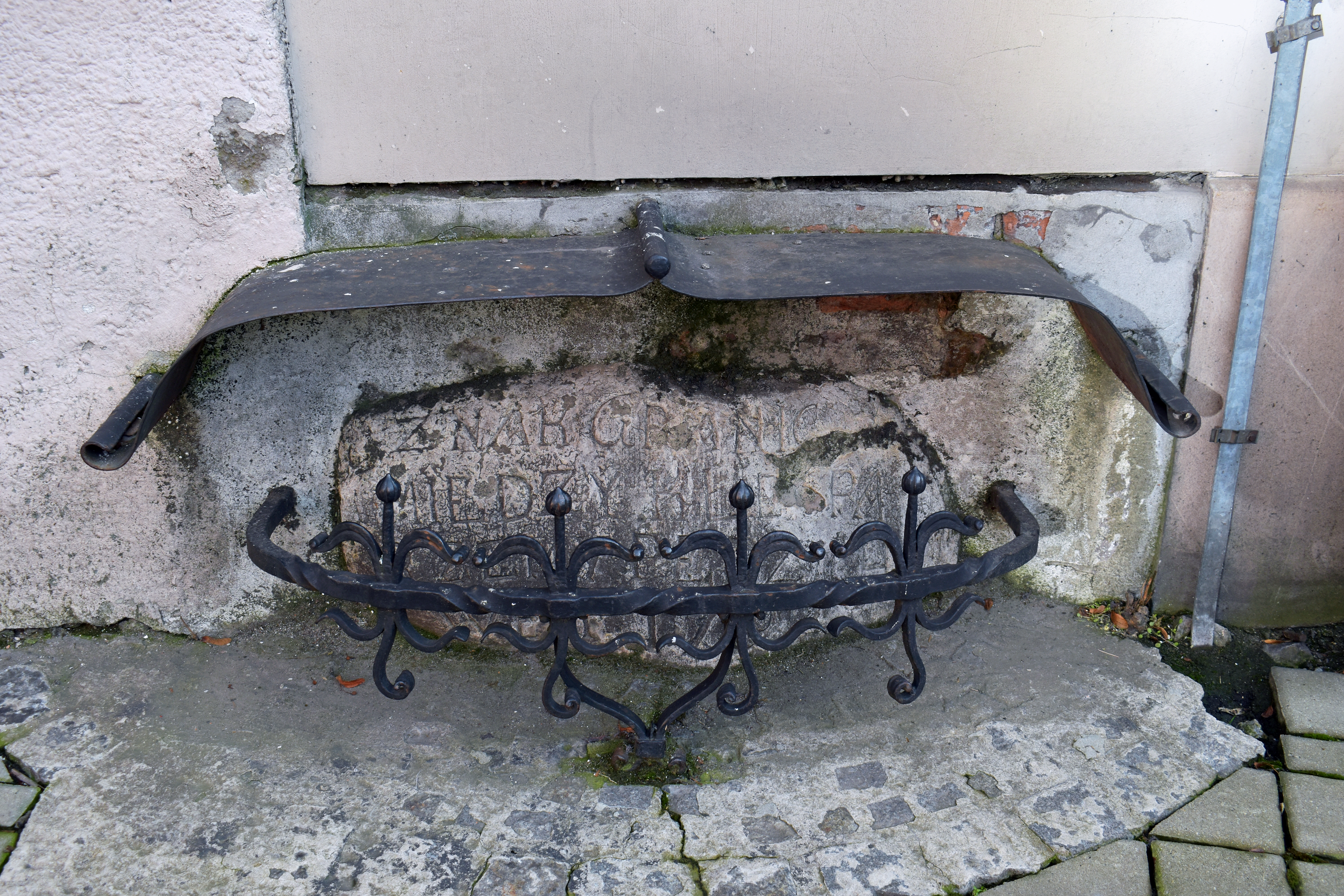
Historic boundary stone between Pędzichów and Kleparz

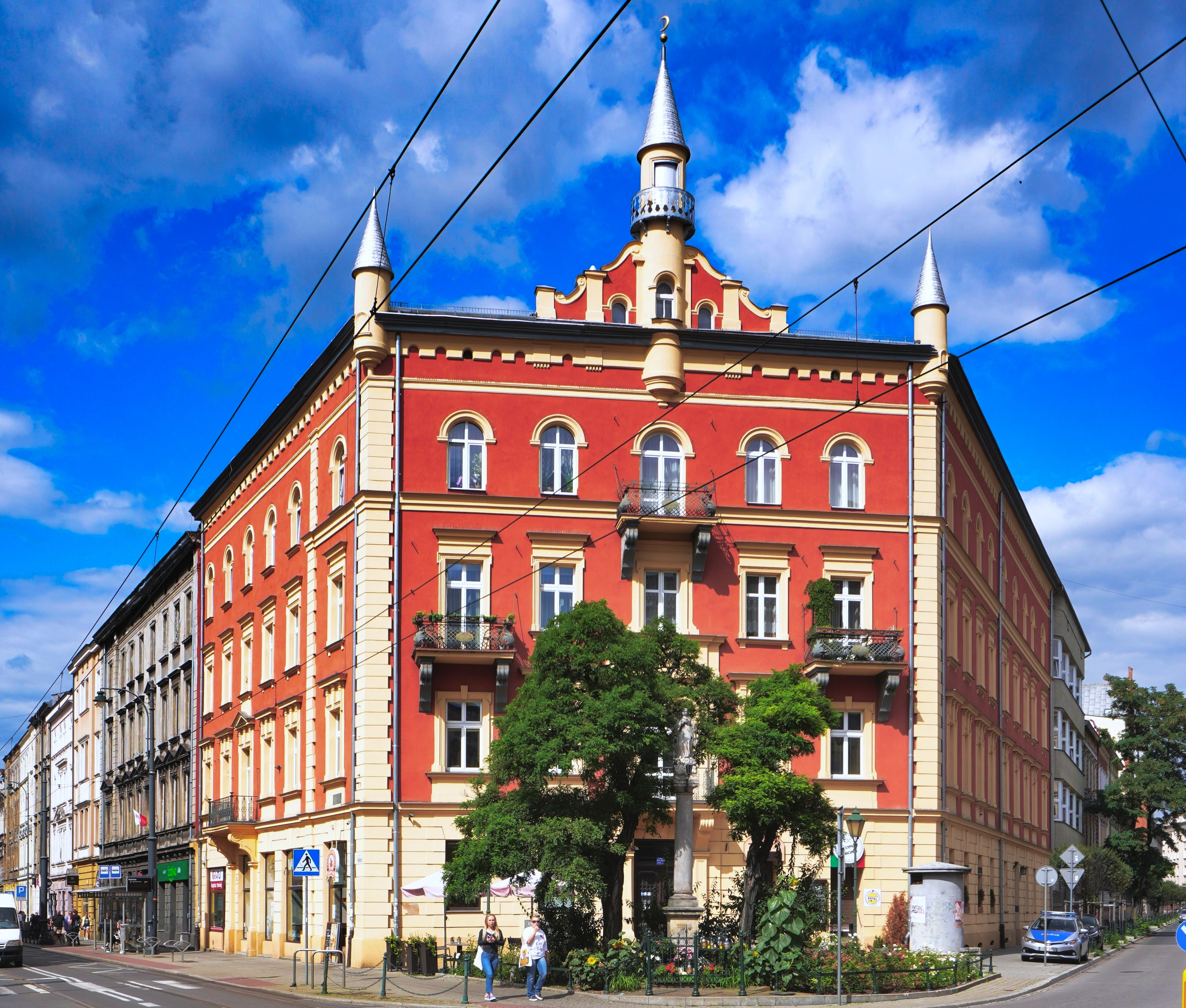
Street Pędzichów 2, "Dom Turecki"

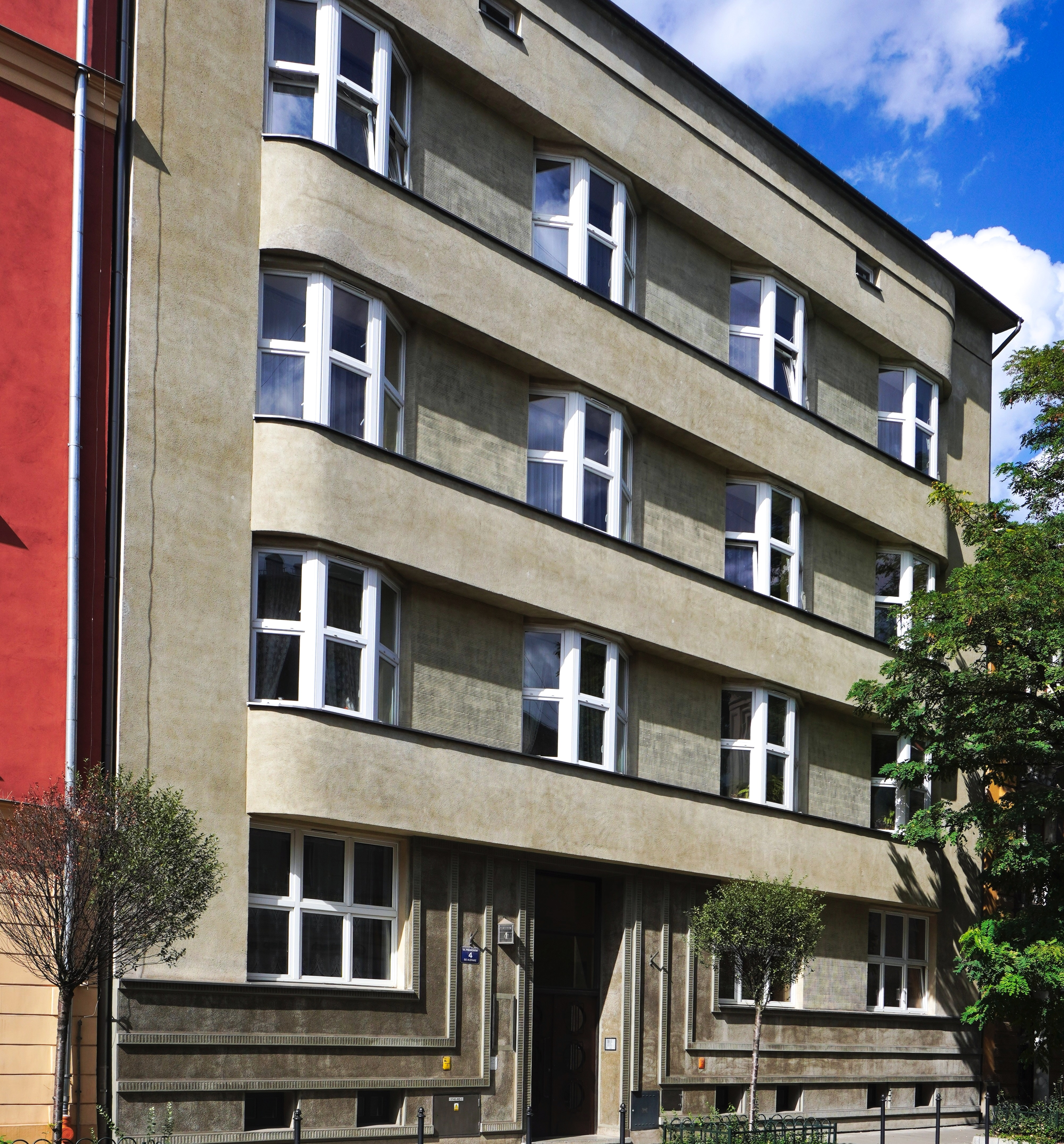
Street Pędzichów 4

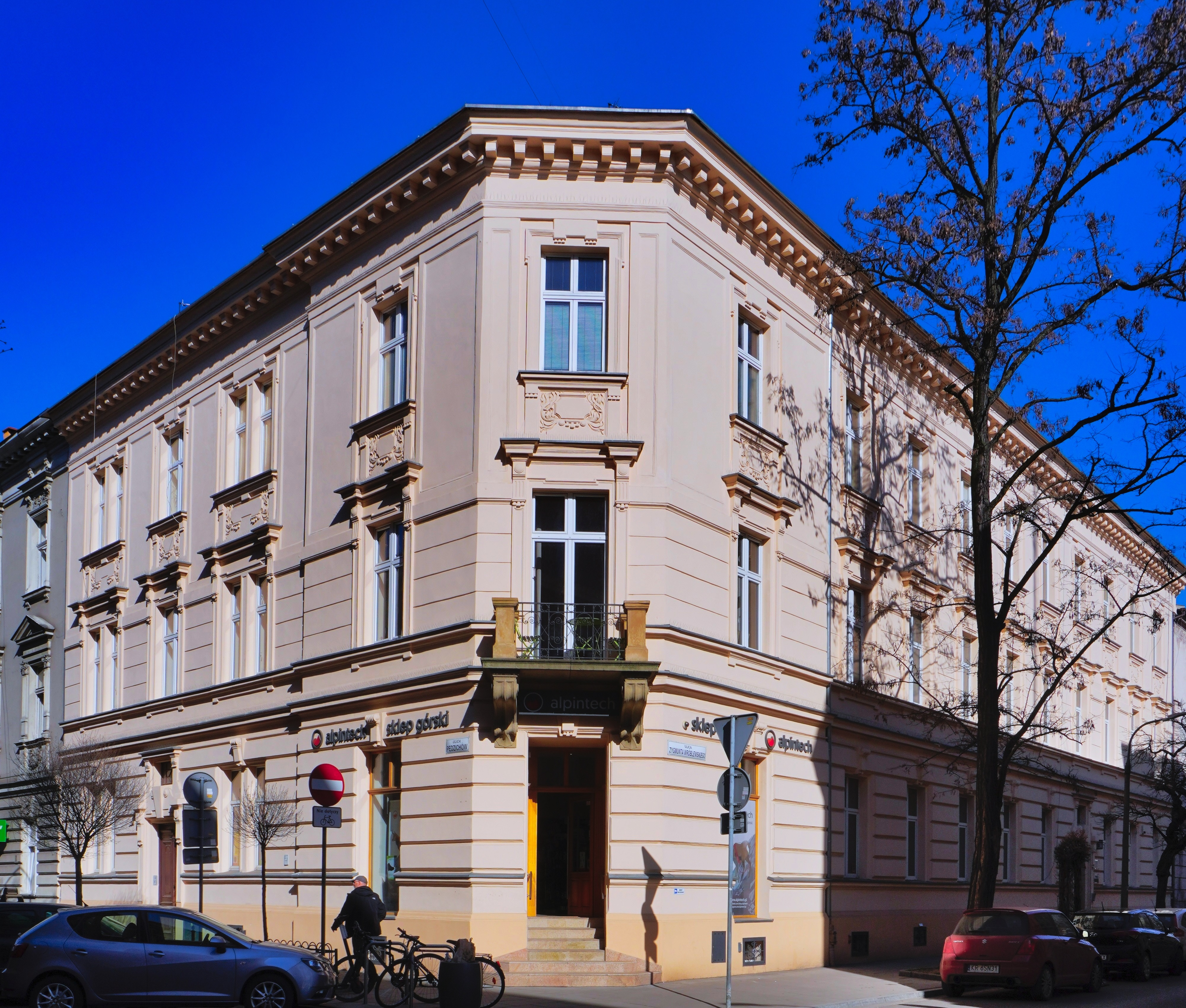
Street Pędzichów 7

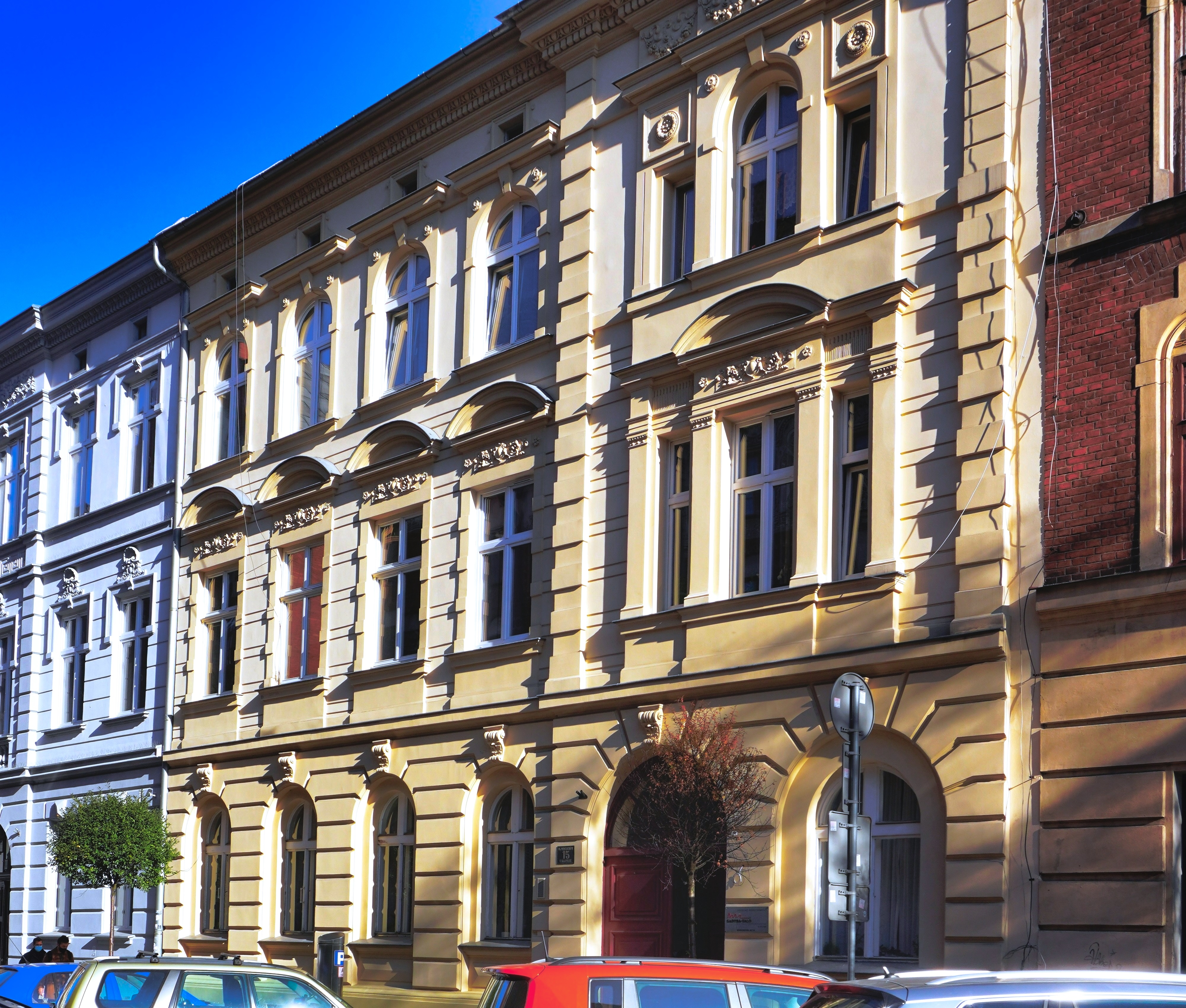
Street Pędzichów 15

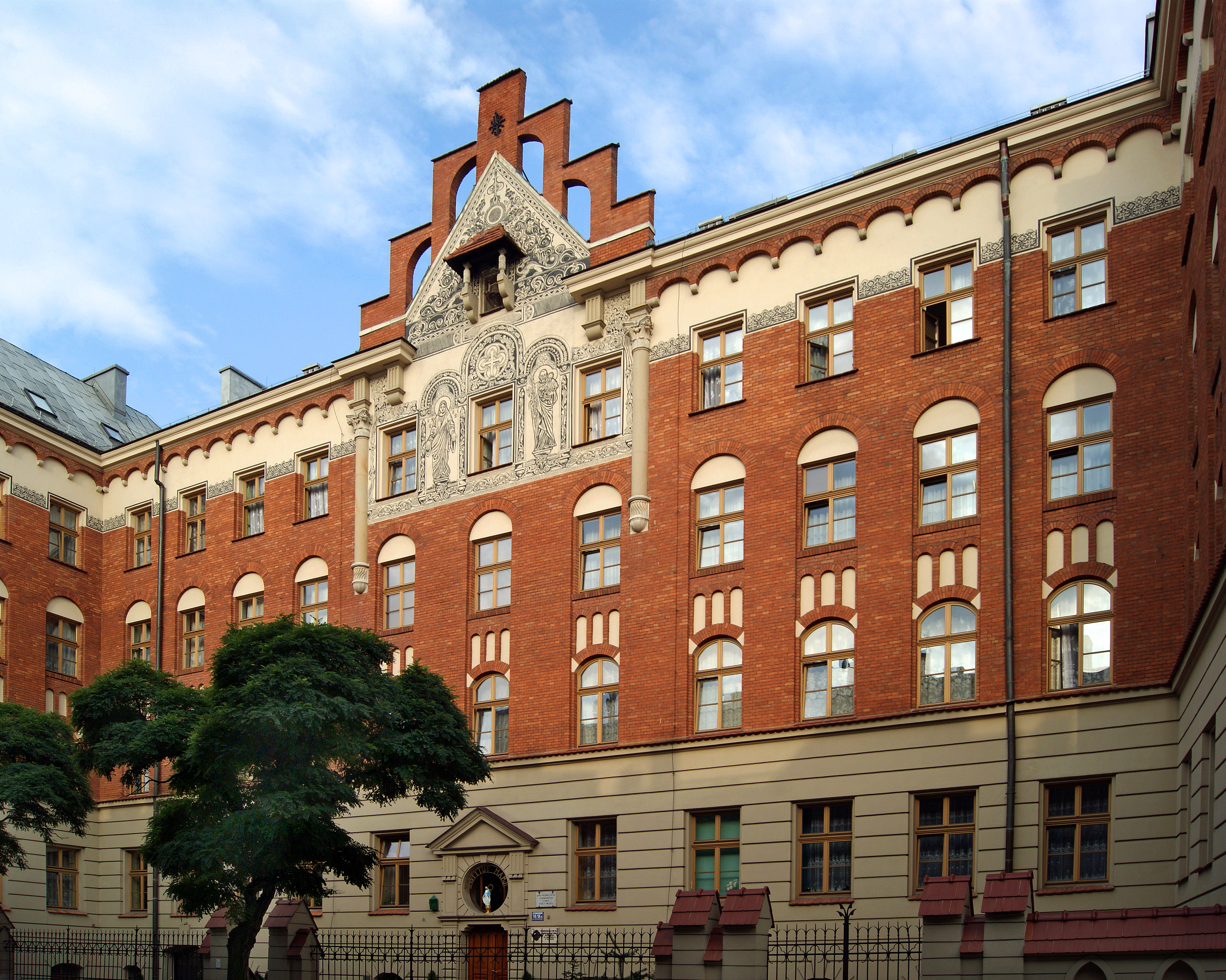
Street Pędzichów 16-16a

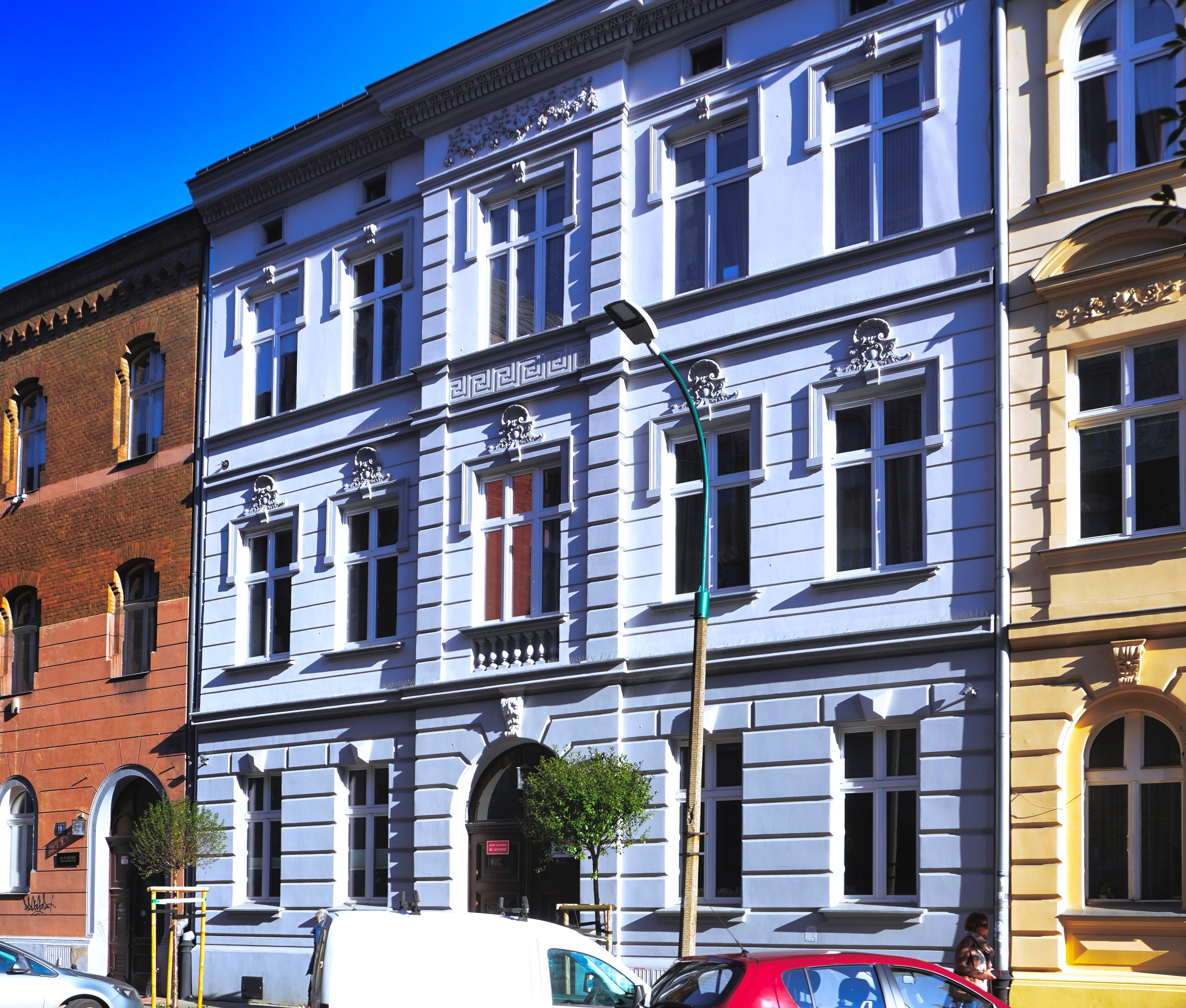
Street Pędzichów 17

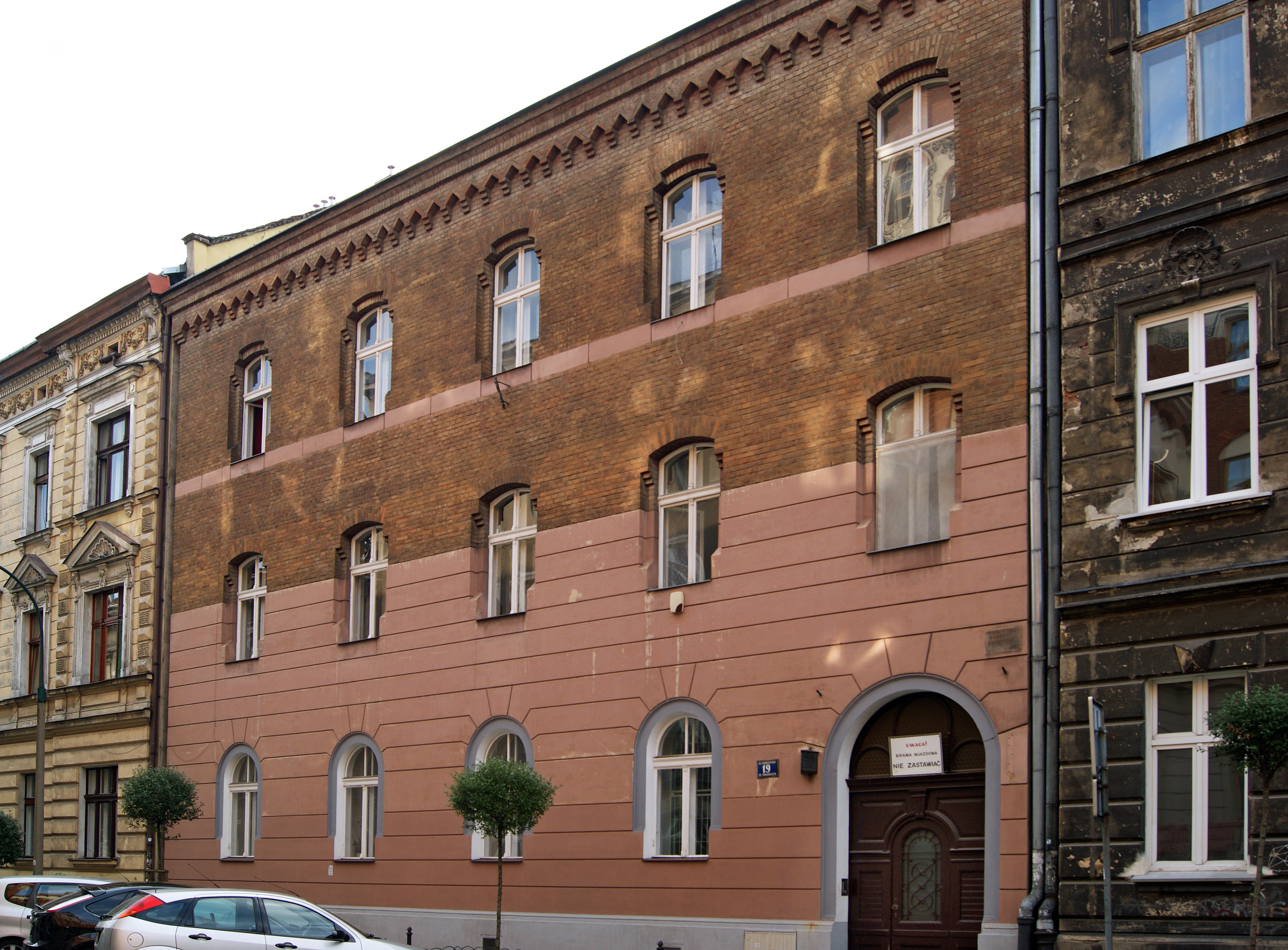
Street Pędzichów 19

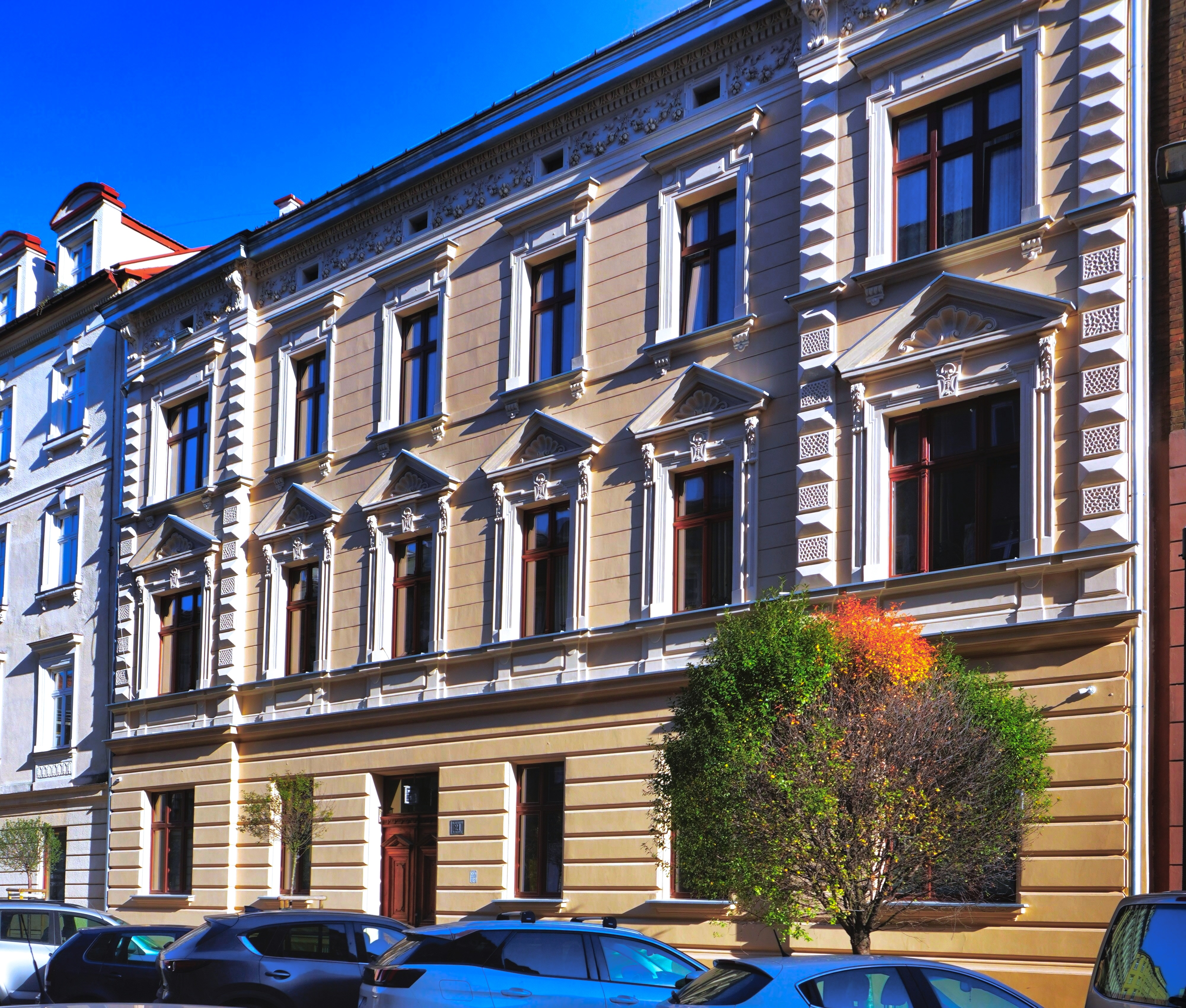
Street Pędzichów 21

== Bibliography ==
- Zabytki Architektury i budownictwa w Polsce (in Polish). Warsaw: Krajowy Ośrodek Badań i Dokumentacji Zabytków. 2007. ISBN 97883-92290681.
- Encyklopedia Krakowa (in Polish). Kraków: Wydawnictwo Naukowe PWN. 2000. ISBN 8301133252.
