= Church of St. Florian, Kraków =

Roman Catholic church in Krakow, Poland

Basilica of St. Florian
- Bazylika św. Floriana
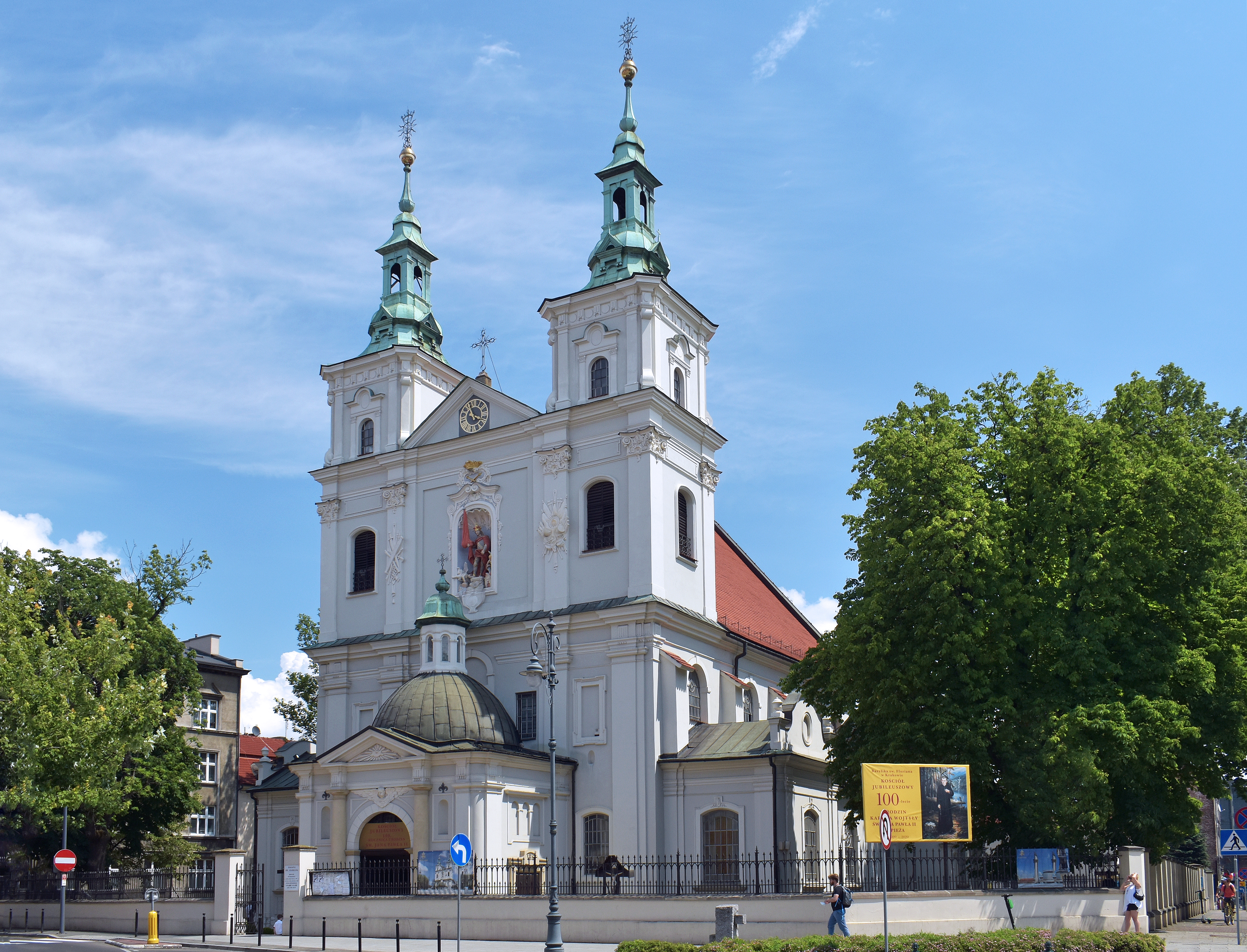
- Basilica of St. Florian
- 50°04′03.2″N 19°56′36″E
- Location: Kraków
- Address: 2 Kurniki Street
- Country: Poland
- Denomination: Roman Catholic
- Website: https://www.swflorian.net/en/saint-florian/

History
- Consecrated: 1184 or 1185

Historic Monument of Poland
- Designated: 1994-09-08
- Part of: Kraków historical city complex
- Reference no.: M.P. 1994 nr 50 poz. 418

The Church of St. Florian (Polish: Kościół św. Floriana), is a historic Roman Catholic parish, university collegiate church, and a Minor Basilica located at 2 Kurniki Street in Kleparz, the former district of Kraków, Poland.

It stands at the northern end of Jan Matejko Square and the former centre of the mediaeval city of Kleparz, now part of the district Old Town. The edifice marks the beginning of the Royal Road.

== History ==
St. Florian's Church was built between 1185 and 1216. It was burnt down many times in the 12th, 16th and 17th centuries. Notably, during the Swedish siege of Kraków, General Stefan Czarniecki ordered the city's suburbs burned down. However, during the citywide fire which consumed a considerable part of Kraków in 1528, the church – containing St. Florian's relics – survived. Since then St. Florian, usually portrayed as a Roman legion officer carrying water, has been revered in Poland as patron saint of firefighters and chimneysweeps. The church's present appearance is the result of a Baroque renovation after the Polish–Swedish wars.

Since the 16th century the Church has been the University Collegiate. The coronation route began there, with the rector of the university senate welcoming new kings. The Church was also the starting point for royal funeral processions to Wawel Cathedral.

In 1667 the remains of Queen Marie Louise Gonzaga, wife of King John II Casimir, were placed there temporarily, and so were the remains of Tadeusz Kościuszko in 1818. From 17 September 1949 to September 1951, Father Karol Wojtyła, who later became Pope John Paul II, worked there as a vicar. As Pope, in 1999 he elevated the Church to a minor basilica. He also visited the Church on his papal pilgrimage to Poland on 18 September 2002.

== The legend ==
Legend has it that in 1184 oxen carrying the remains of St. Florian – the future patron saint of Poland – the relics miraculously grew too heavy to be taken any further into the city and remained in Kleparz until it was decided for the Church to be built at that exact spot. The martyr had nothing do with Poland before his relics were brought from Rome to Kraków. Kraków needed a saint for political reasons, in order to reaffirm its role as Poland's capital, which was contested by the city of Gniezno.

The district of Kleparz was founded by Casimir the Great in 1366 as a separate town, around St. Florian's Church. It was named by King Casimir as Florencja (English: Florence) after its centrally located church, or in Latin, Clepardia. Kleparz remained an unofficial suburb of Kraków till 1792, when the Polish Parliament incorporated it within the city.

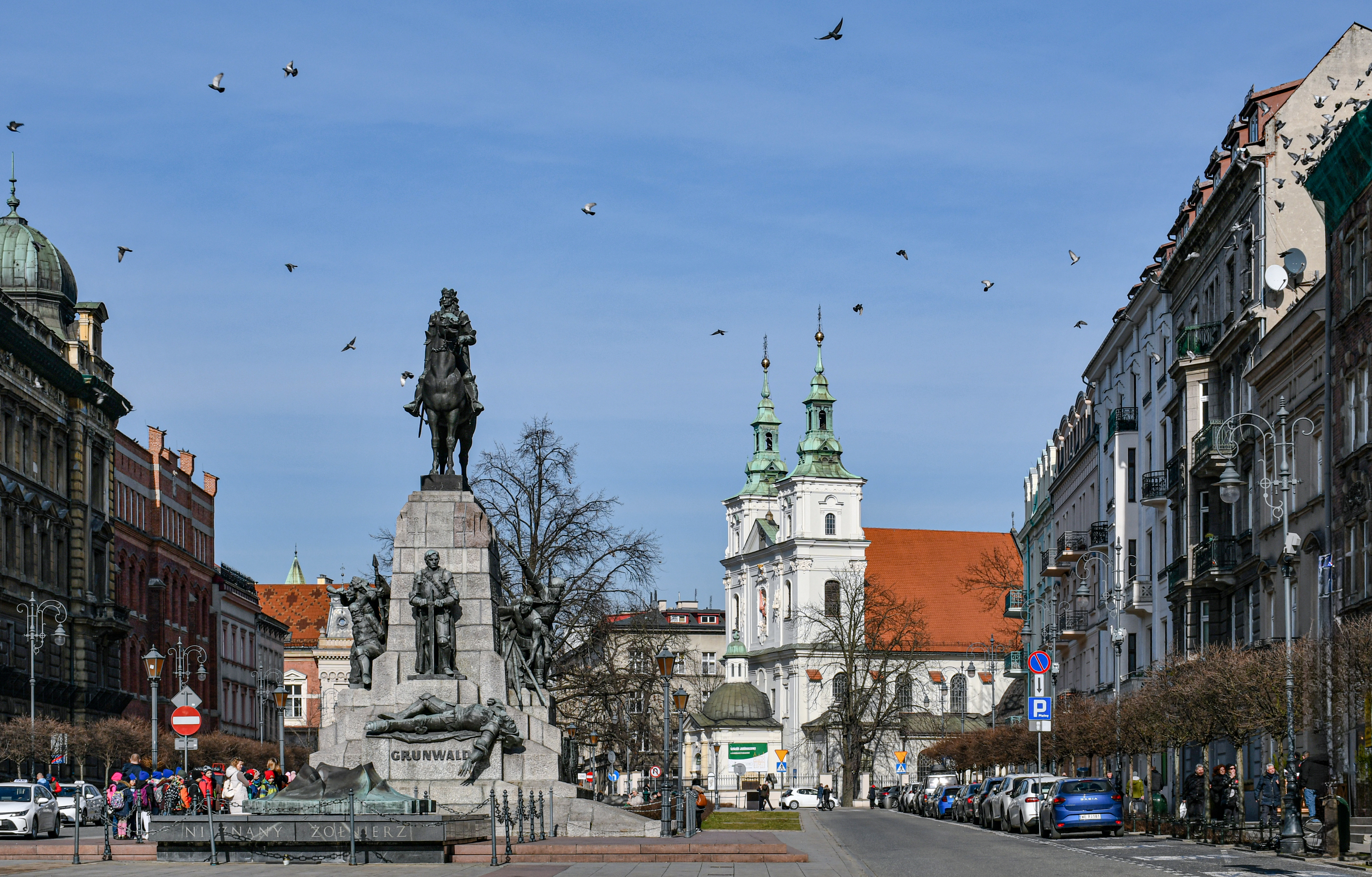
Matejko Square. From left to right, Tomb of the Unknown Soldier, Grunwald Monument, and (in background) St. Florian's Church

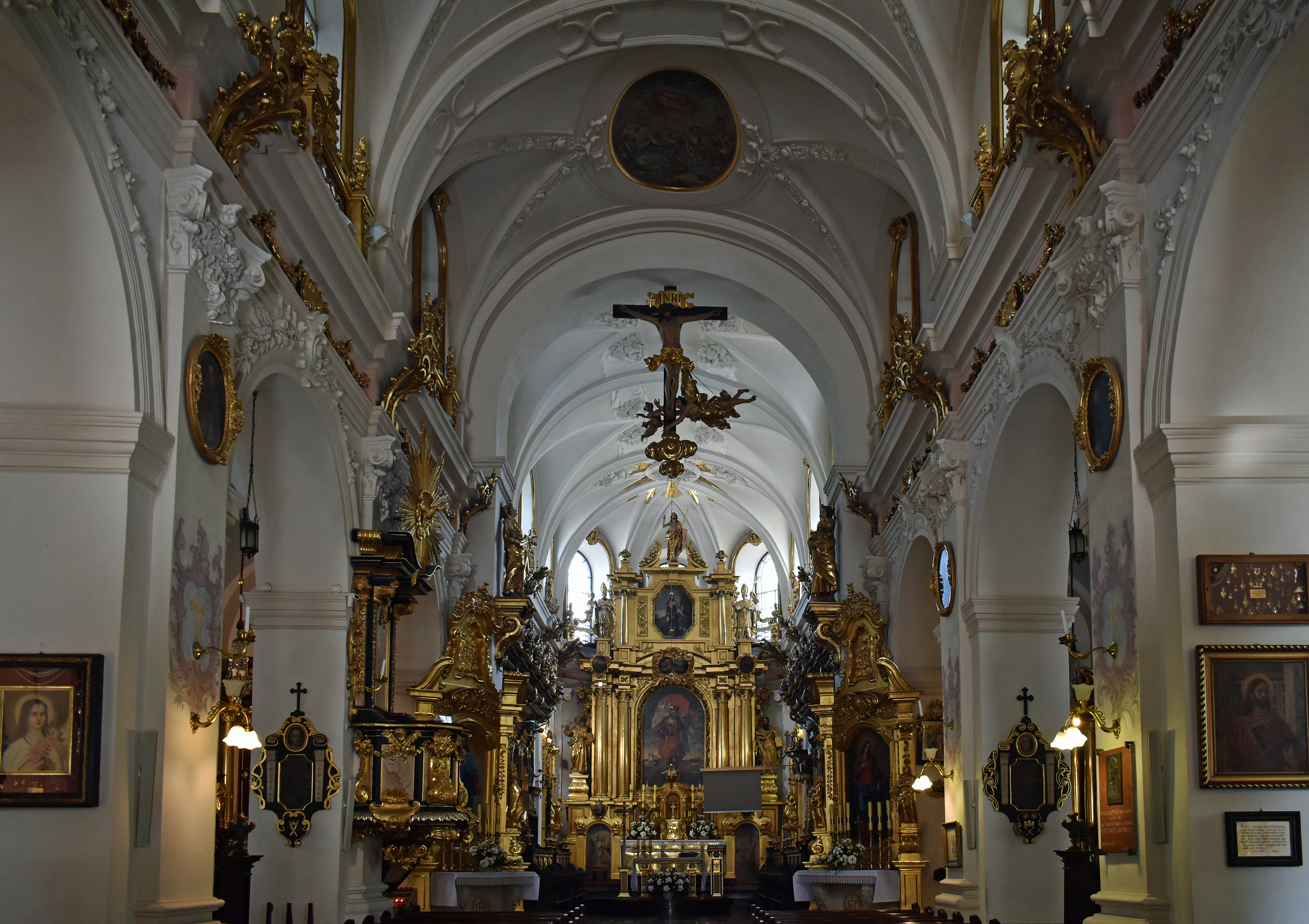
Church interior.

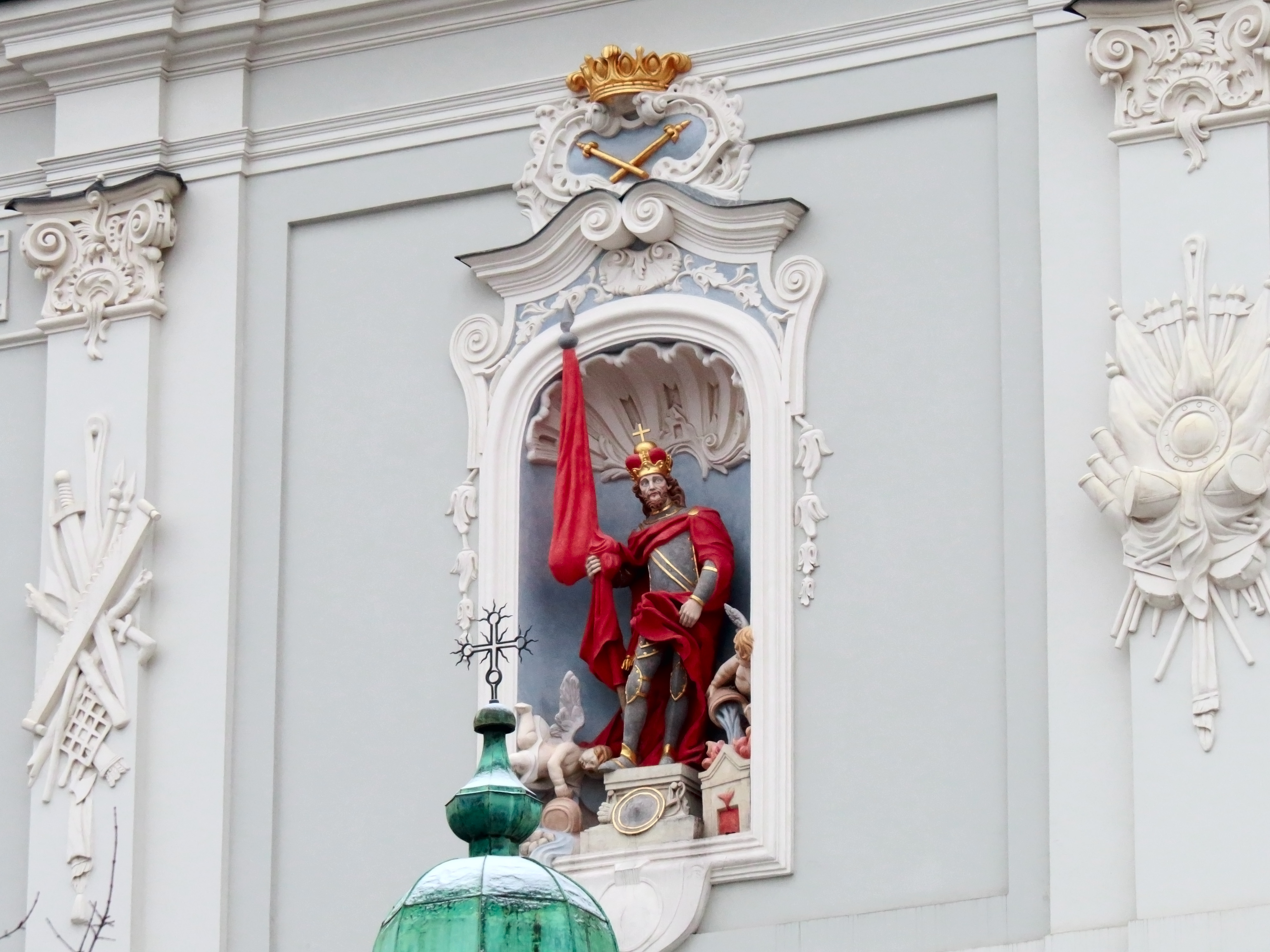
Figure of St. Florian on the church facade.

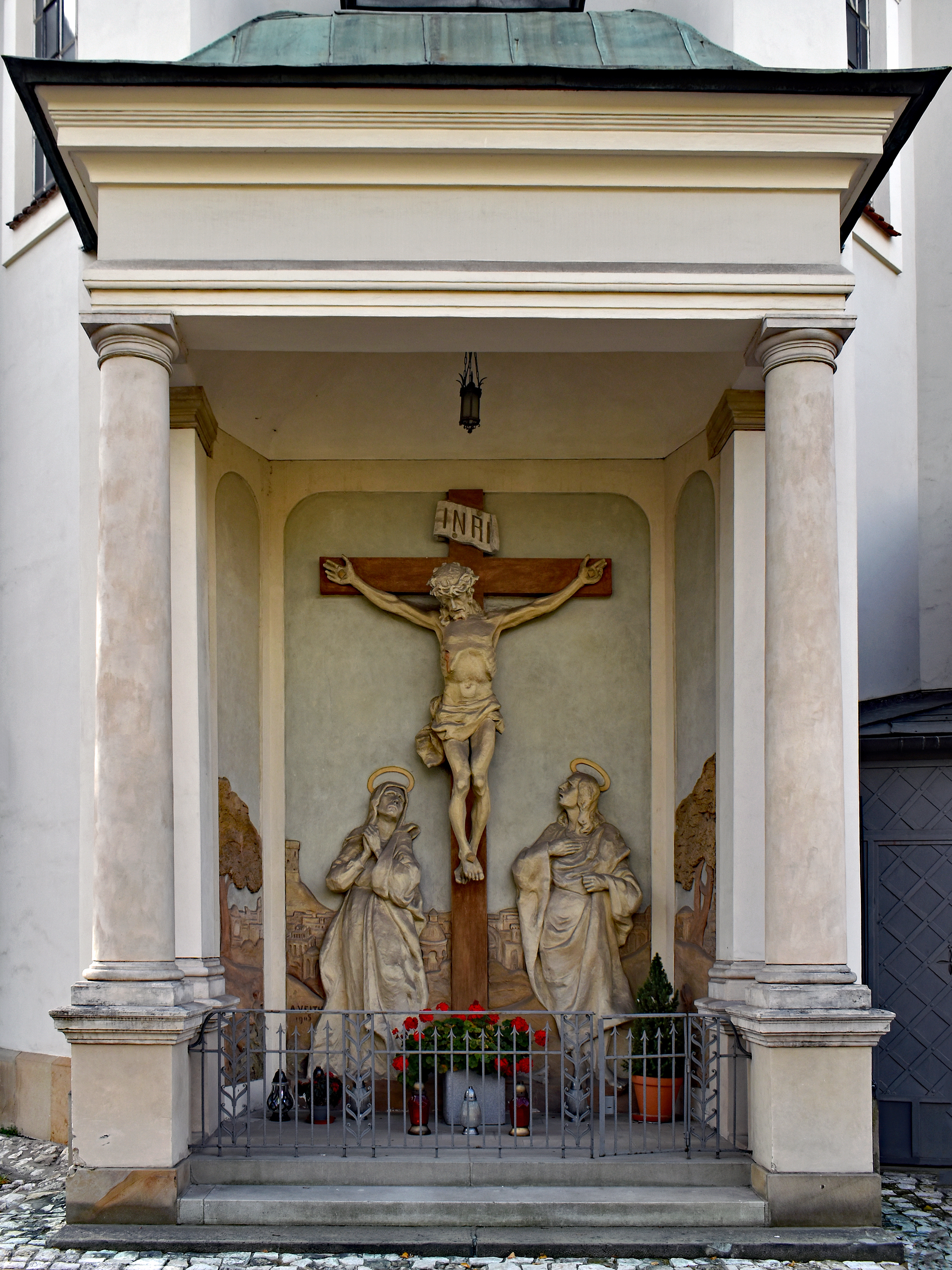
Golgotha, outer wall of the presbytery, designed by Aleksander Józef Veith (1905).

== See also ==
- St. Florian's Gate
