= Kleparz, Kraków =

Former town, former V quarter of Kraków, Poland

Kleparz
- Former town Former V quarter of Kraków
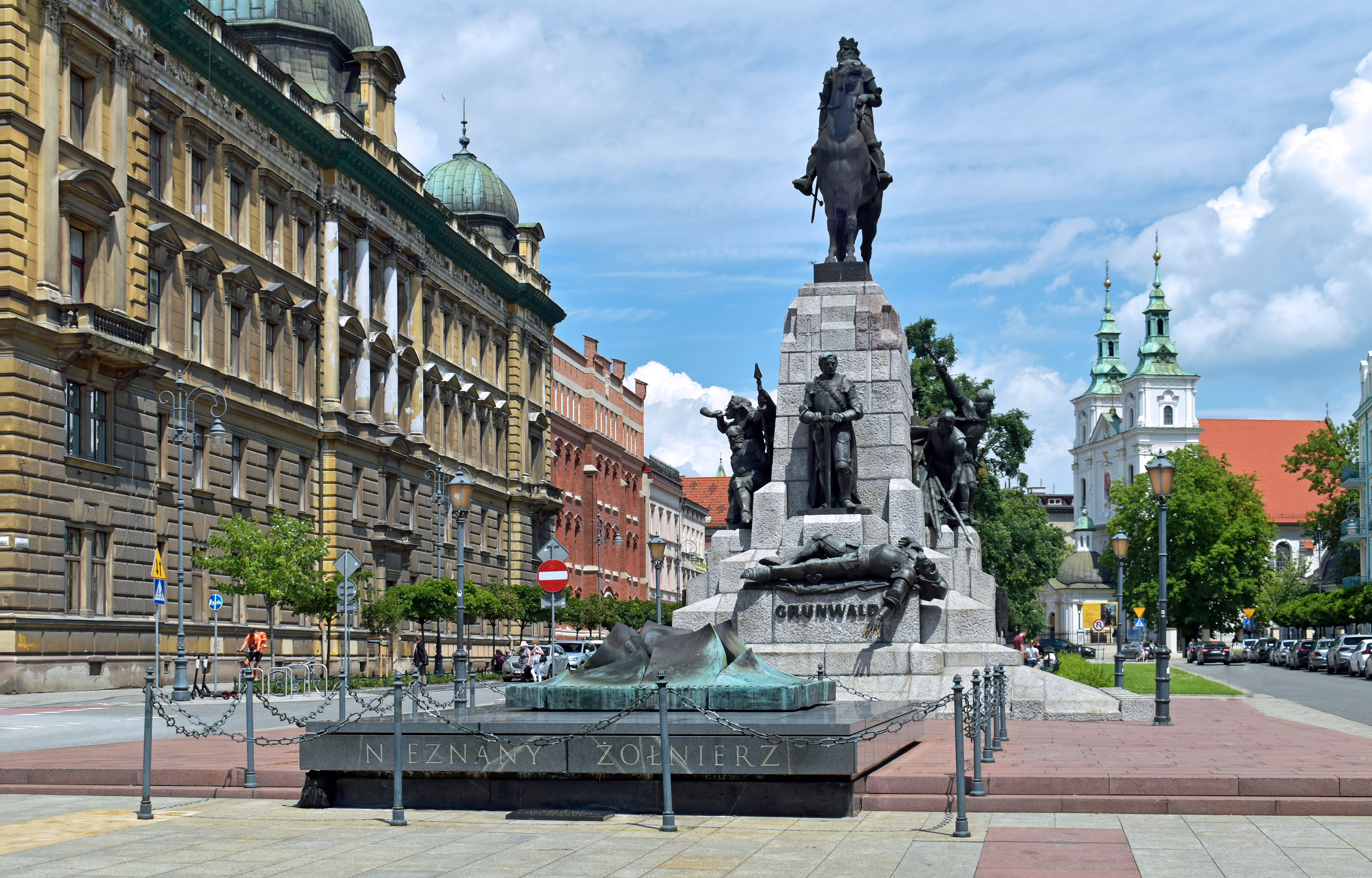
- Jan Matejko Square, eastern part of formerly Kleparz Market Square

- Kleparz on the map of the District I Old Town
- Coordinates: 50°04′12″N 19°56′24.5″E
- Country: Poland
- Voivodeship: Lesser Poland
- City: Kraków

Historic Monument of Poland
- Designated: 1994-09-08
- Part of: Kraków historical city complex
- Reference no.: M.P. 1994 nr 50 poz. 418

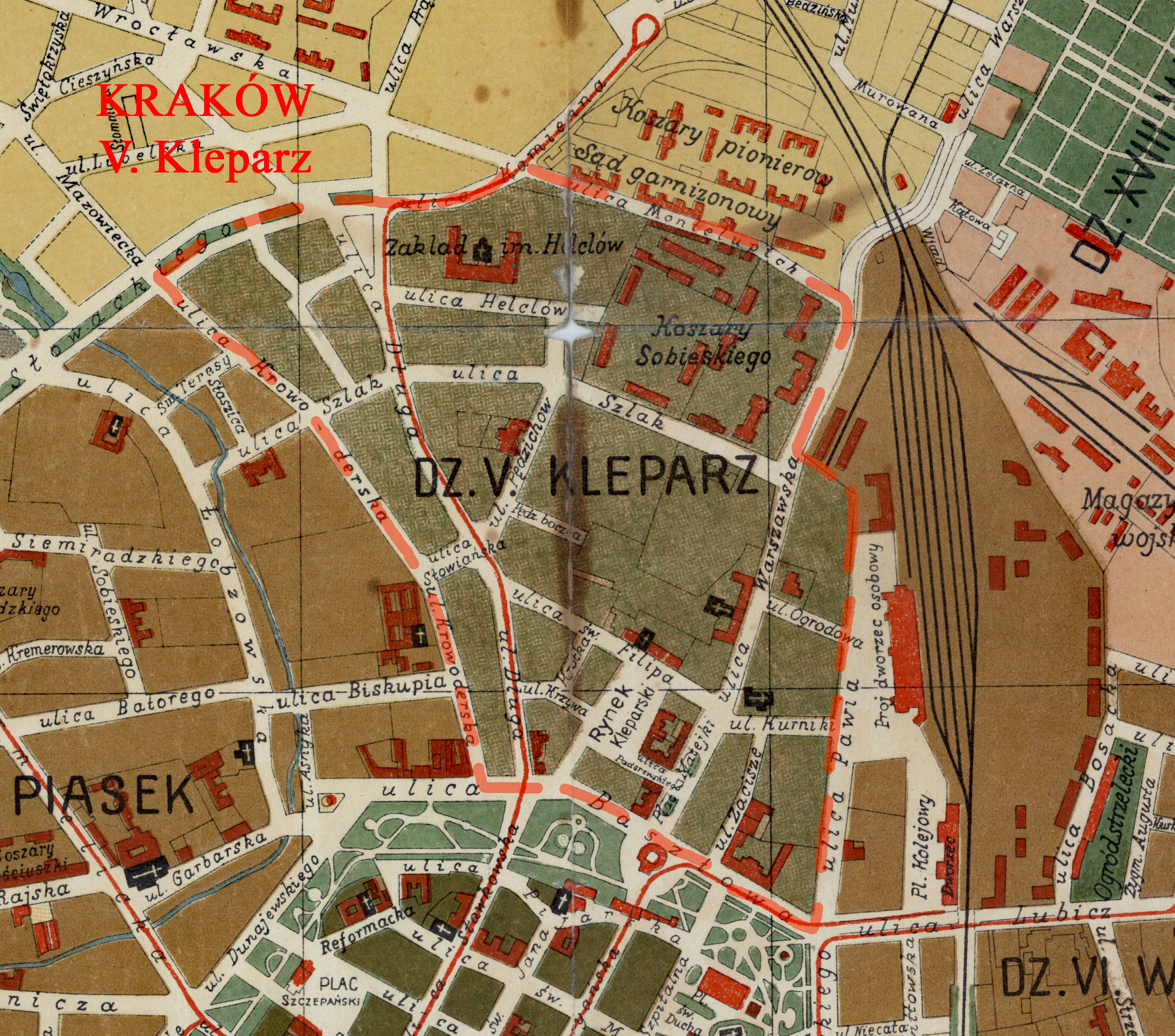
Kleparz, formerly (to 1954) quarter of Kraków

Kleparz (Latin: Clepardia) is a former, from 1366 an independent town in 1792 incorporated into Kraków, Poland. Until 1954 the V quarter of the city, it is now part of the District I Old Town. Located north of the Old Town.

== History ==
The first known settlement within the present Kleparz boundaries was founded before 1184. In this year the Church of St. Florian was erected by the Kraków Bishop Gedko. The settlement grew very fast in number and size, so it soon was known as the Alta civitas and had about one thousand inhabitants as well as 2,380 horses. Casimir the Great granted it location rights in 1366 and named it Florencja, after St. Florian's Church.

Houses of timber were built around the market square and its citizens were mainly craftsmen, including smiths and tailors. In the next century the new name Kleparz (Latin Clepardia) replaced the previous one. Kleparz was burned down several times during wars or by great fires in 1476, 1528, 1655, 1657, 1755 and 1768. In 1792 it was incorporated into the city of Kraków by the decision of the Great Sejm.

In the 19th century Kleparz was rebuilt with new residential mansions in neoclassicist and art nouveau styles.

== Interesting sights ==
The most interesting sights in Kleparz are the Kleparz Market Square with colorful stalls and the Jan Matejko Square located almost side by side and flanked by the Academy of Fine Arts and the St. Florian Church with the Grunwald Monument at its centre.

== Gallery ==
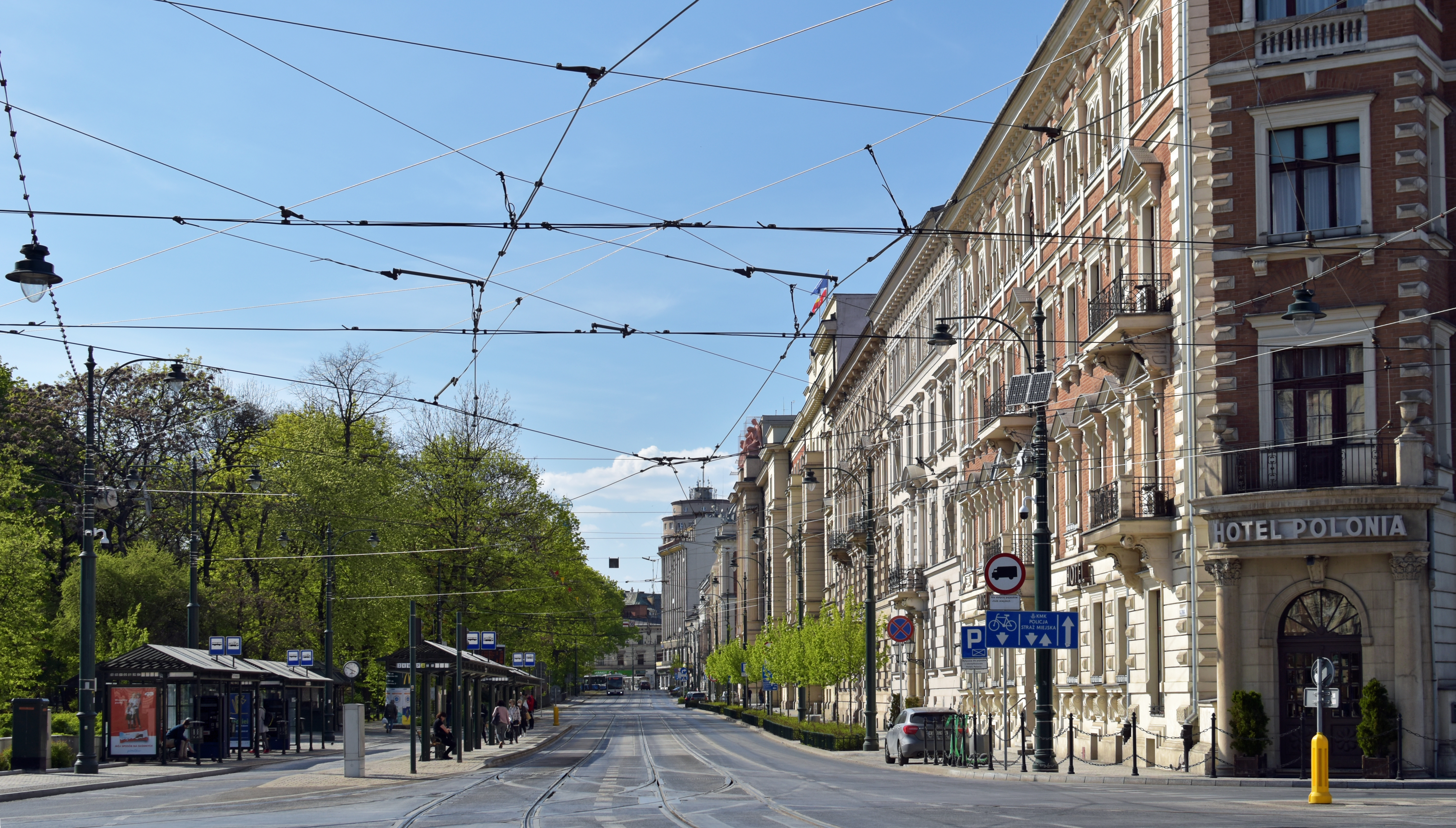
Basztowa Street
On the right Kleparz, on the left Planty Park

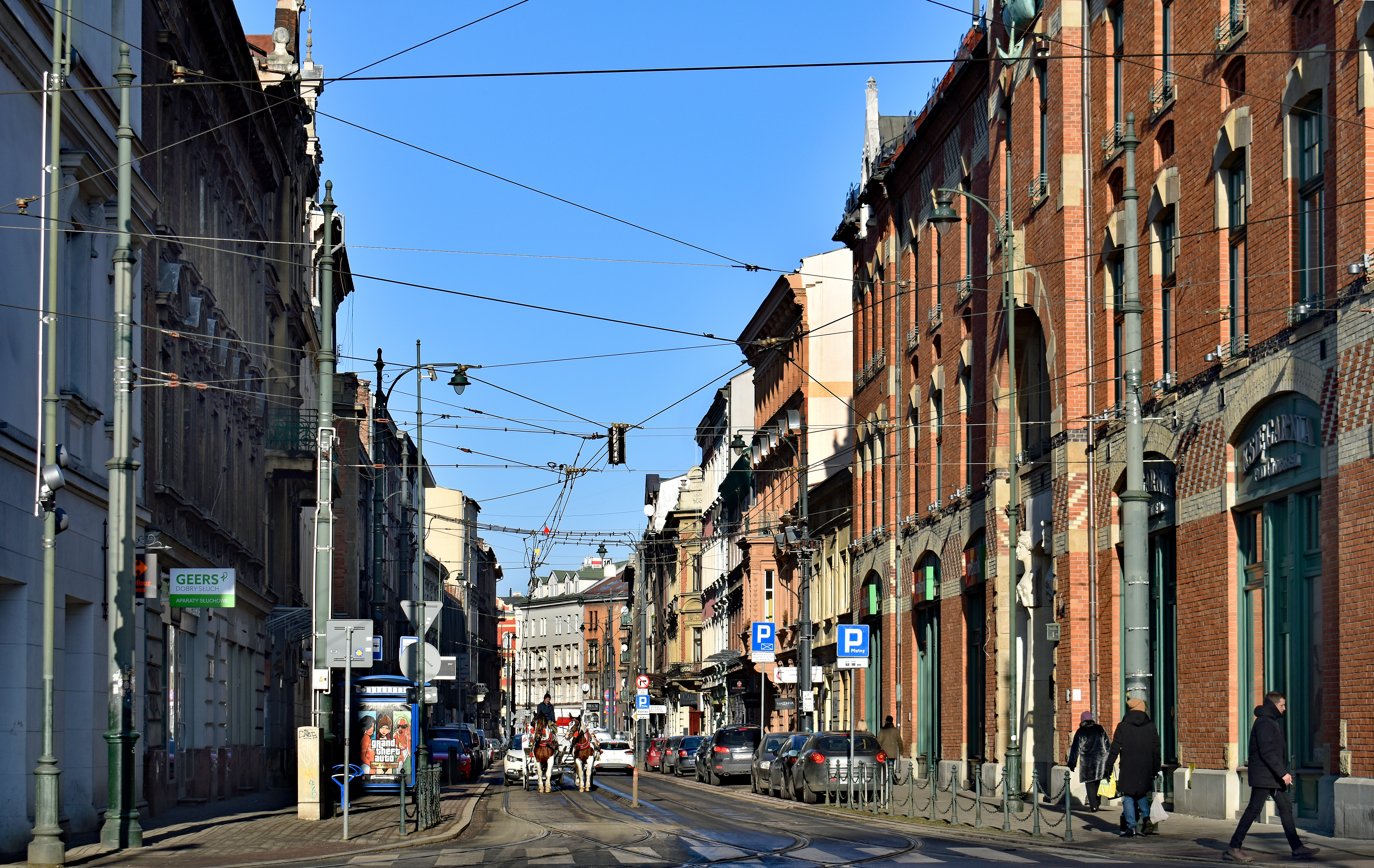
Długa Street (view to north from Basztowa Street)

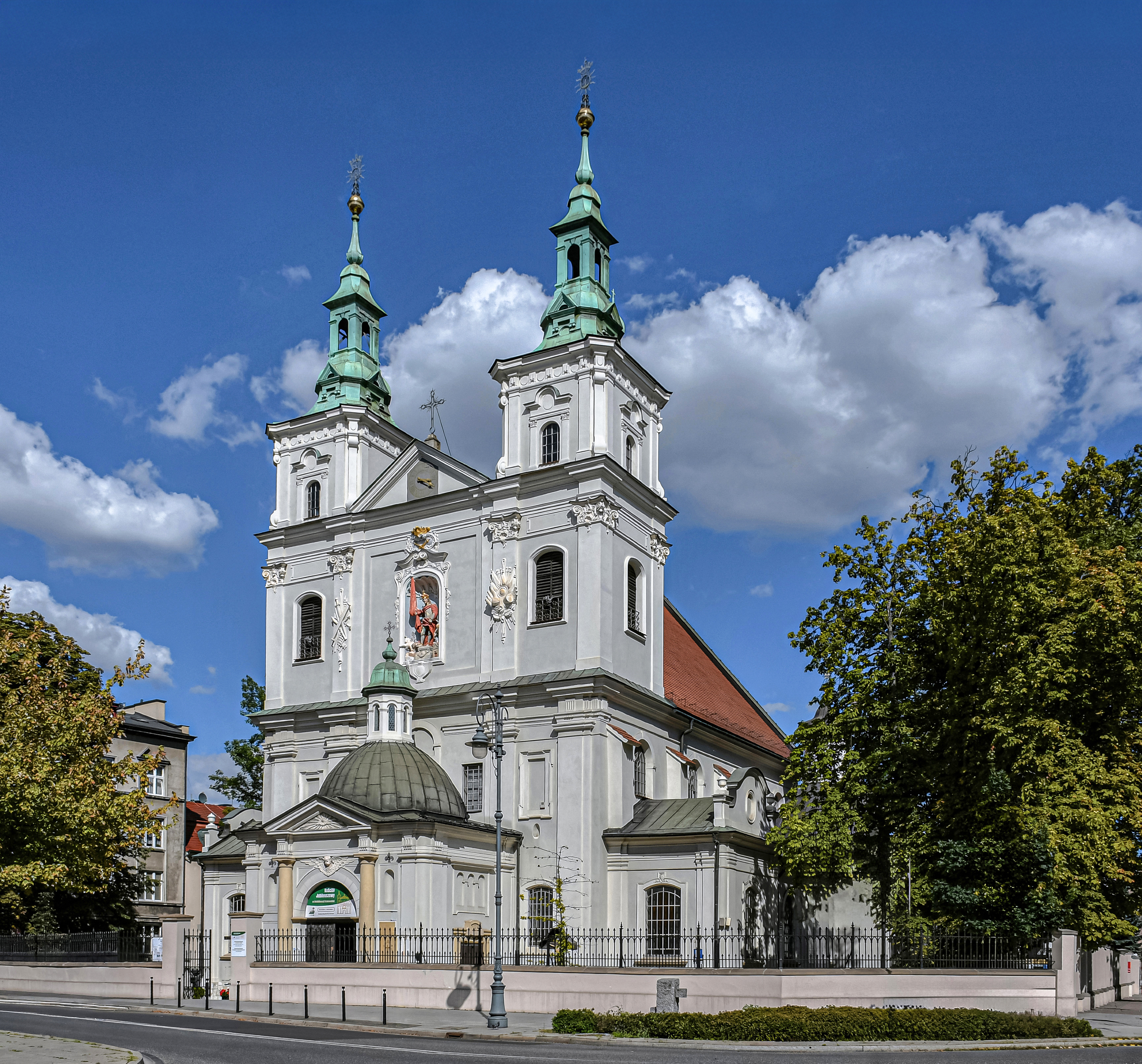
Church of St. Florian

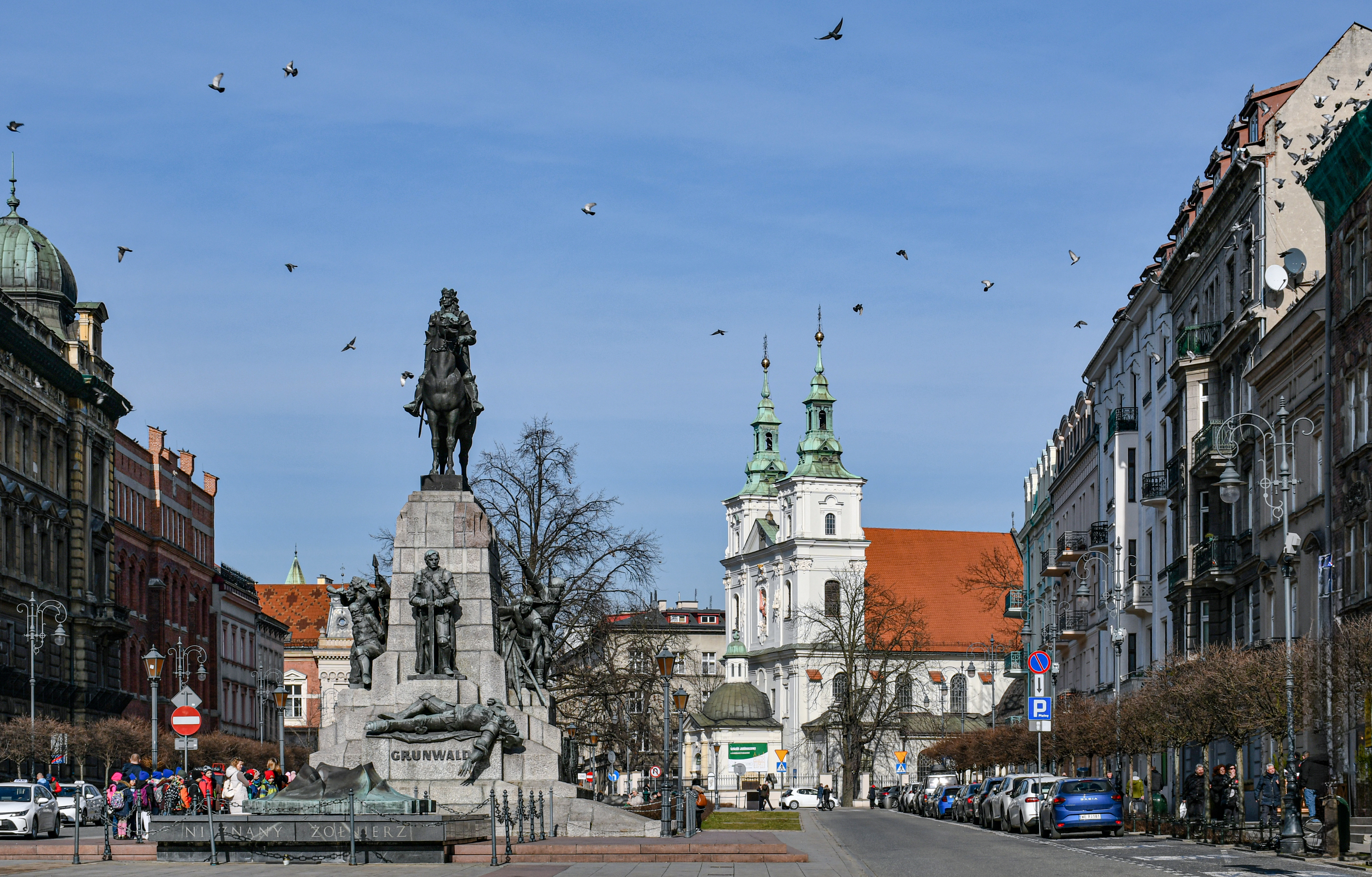
Jan Matejko Square
Tomb of the Unknown Soldier, Grunwald Monument, and (in background) of St. Florian Church

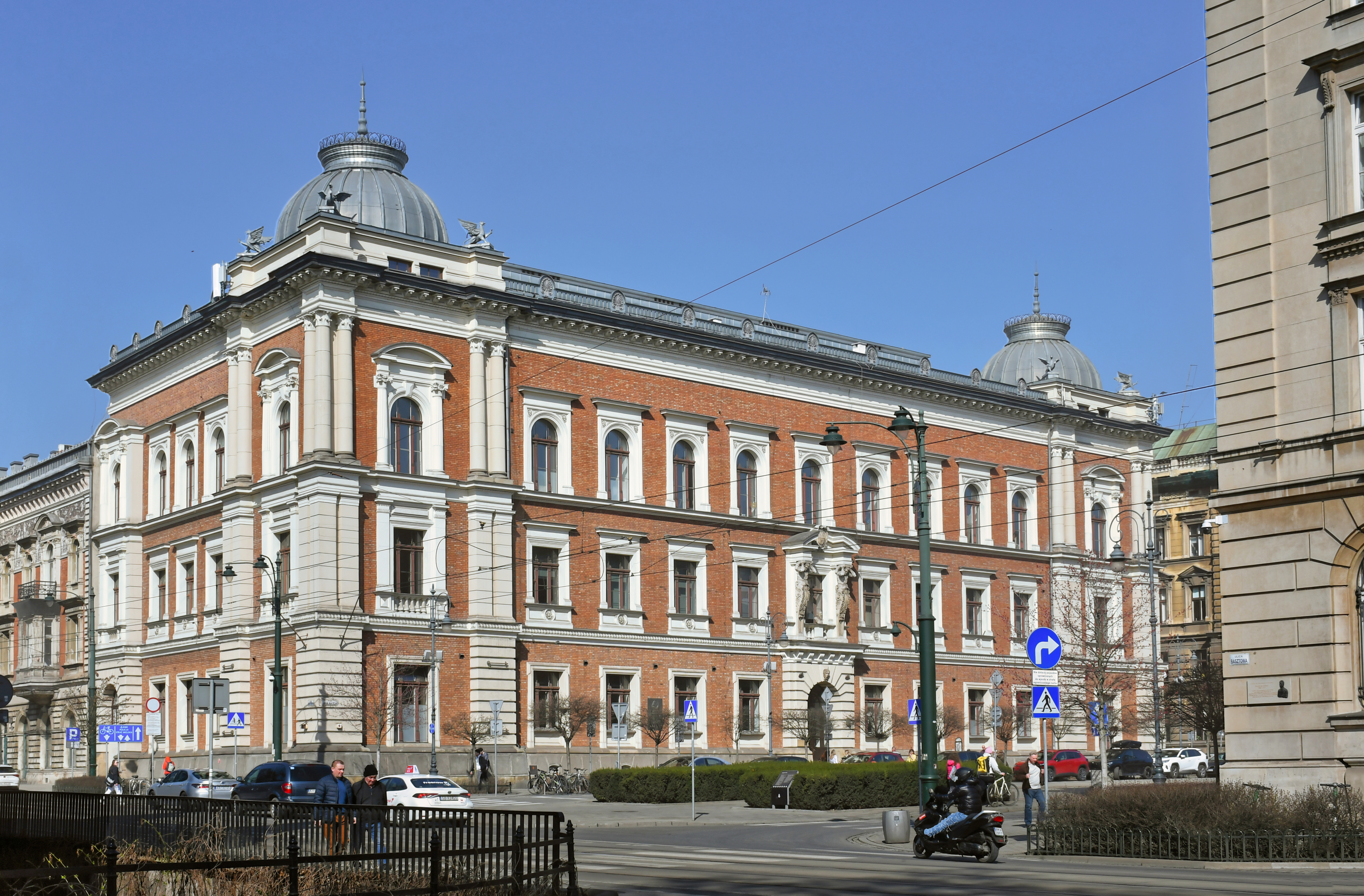
Building of the Jan Matejko Academy of Fine Arts

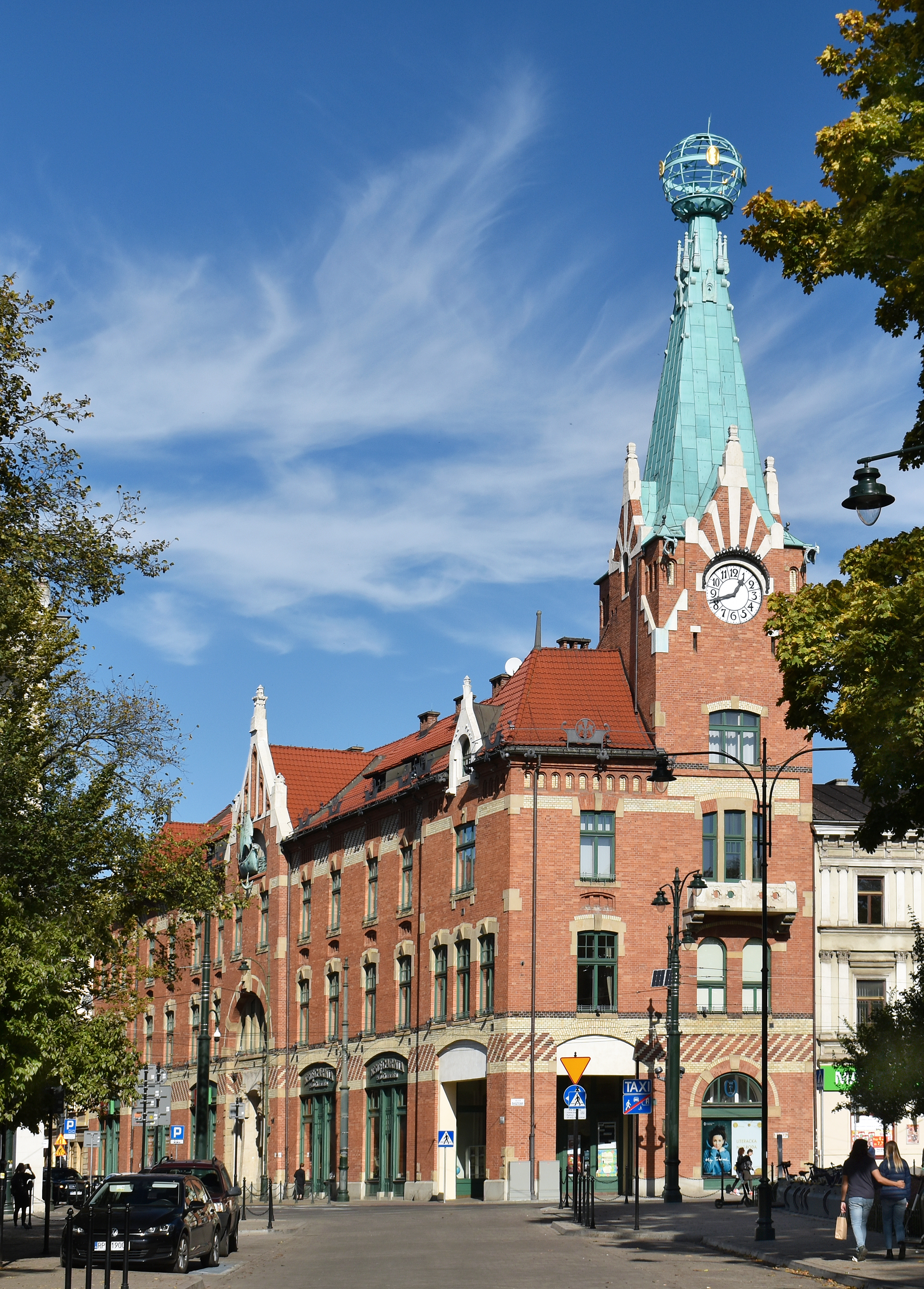
Pod Globusem (Under the Globe) House

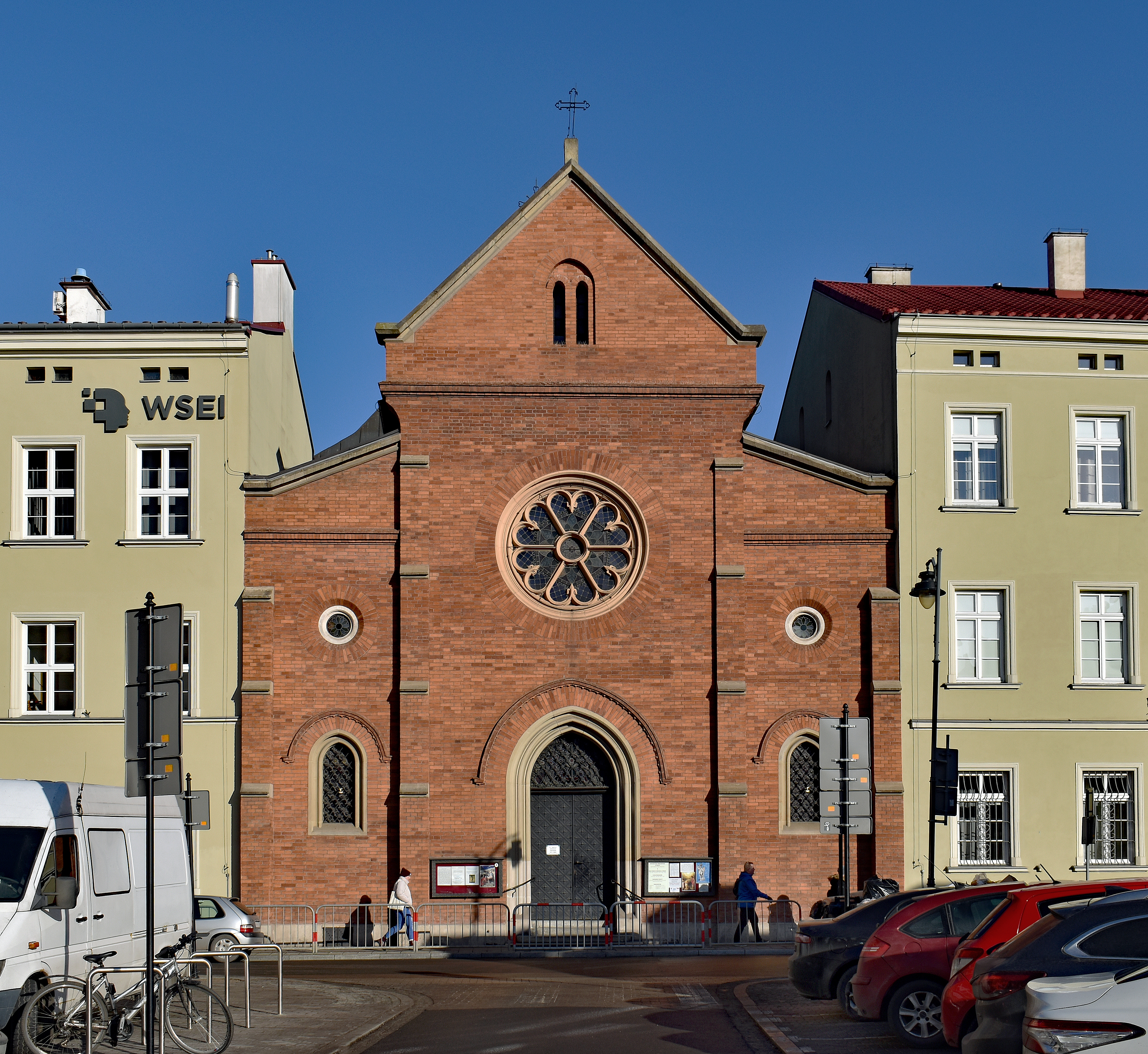
Church of St. Vincent de Paul

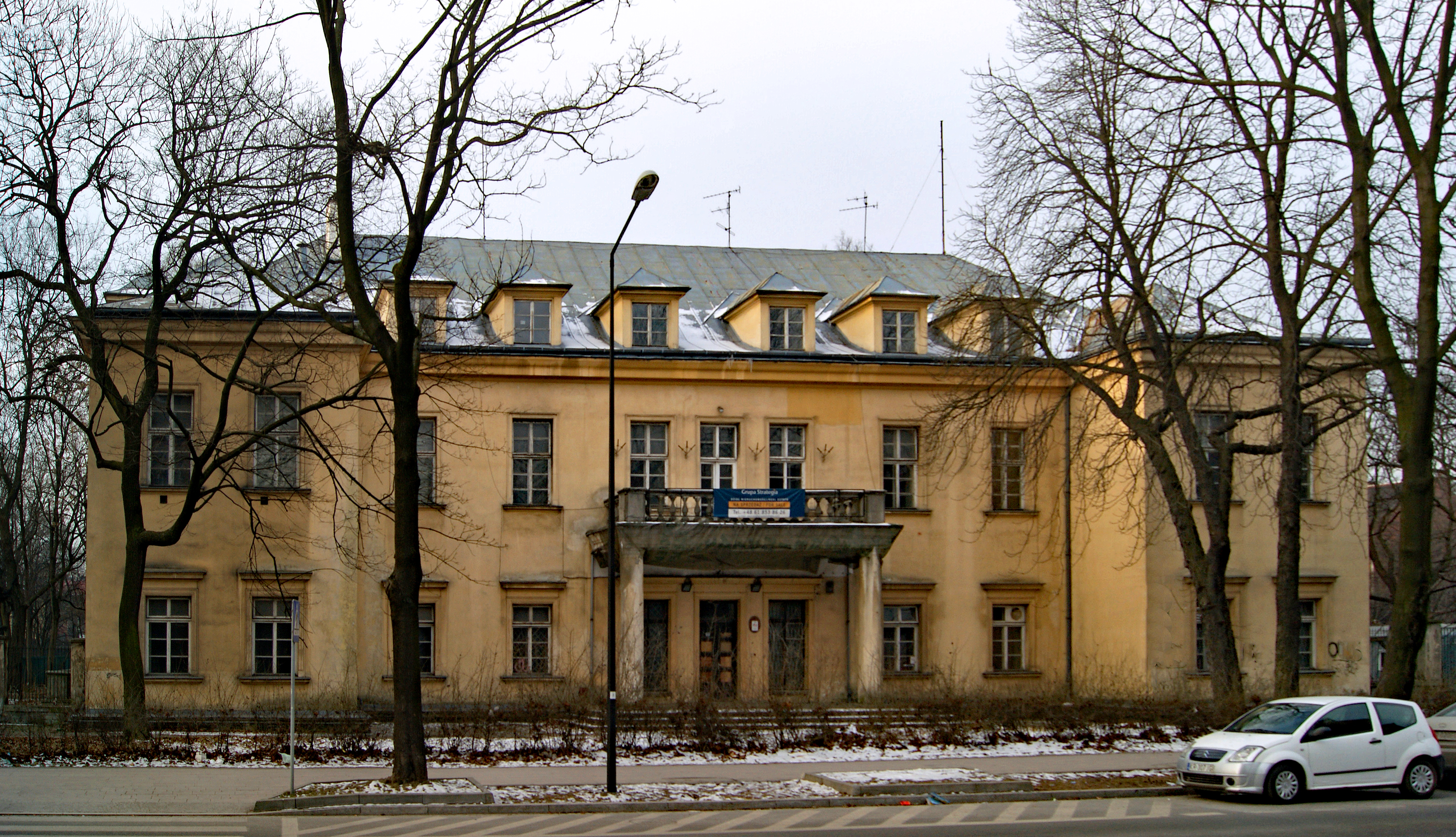
Na Szlaku (Montelupi) Palace

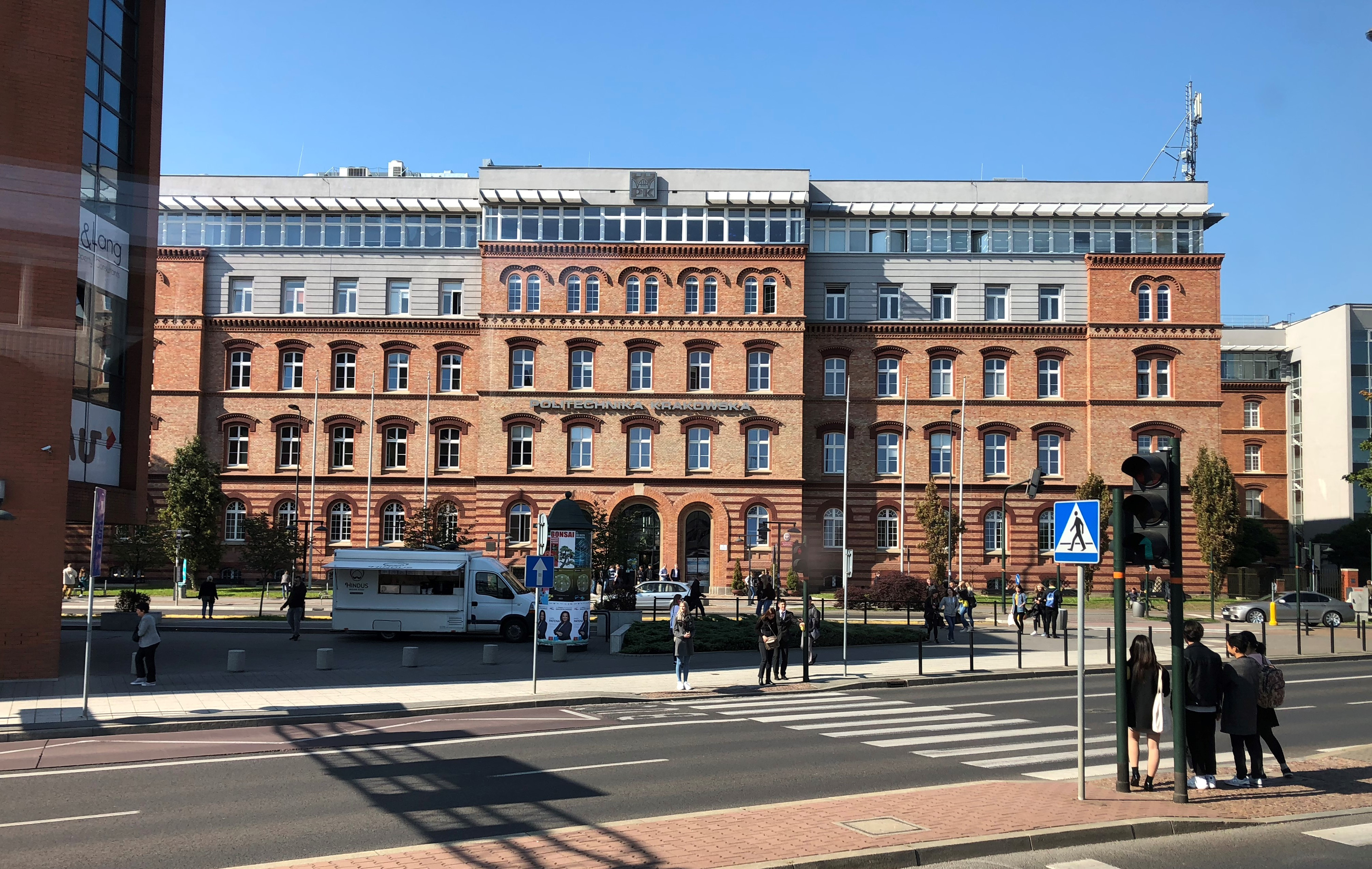
Tadeusz Kościuszko Kraków University of Technology

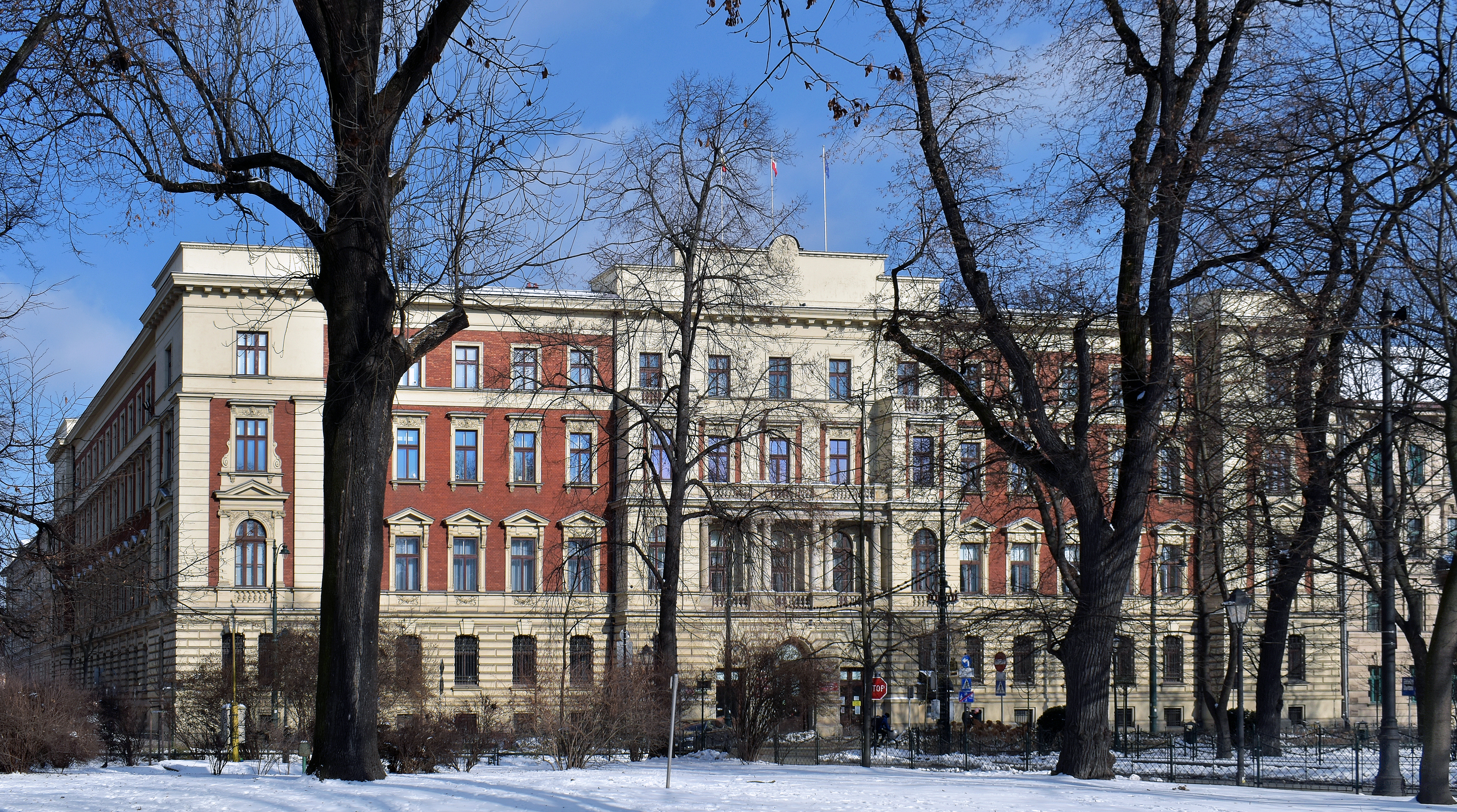
Lesser Poland Voivodship Office

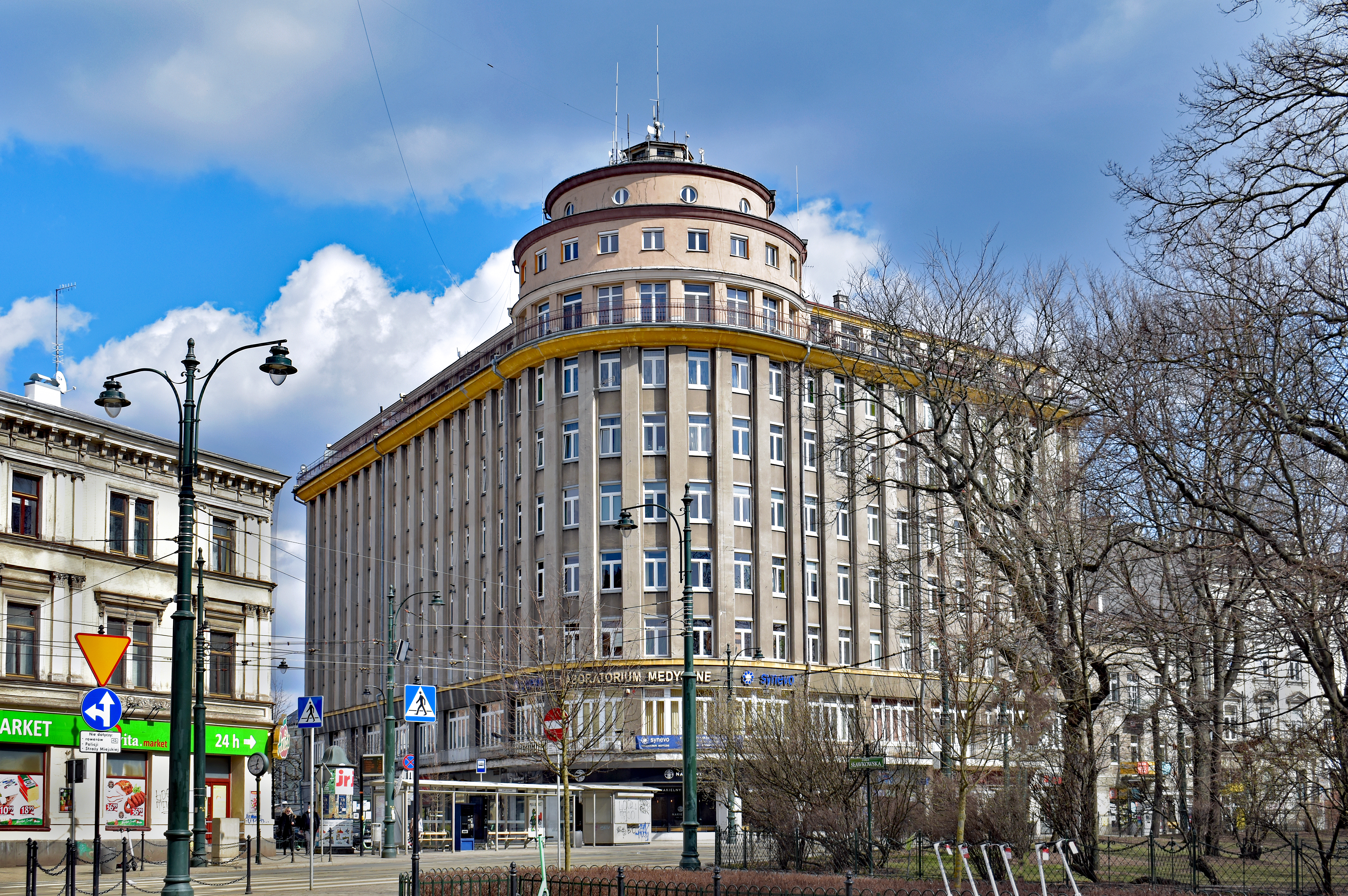
Feniks tenement house

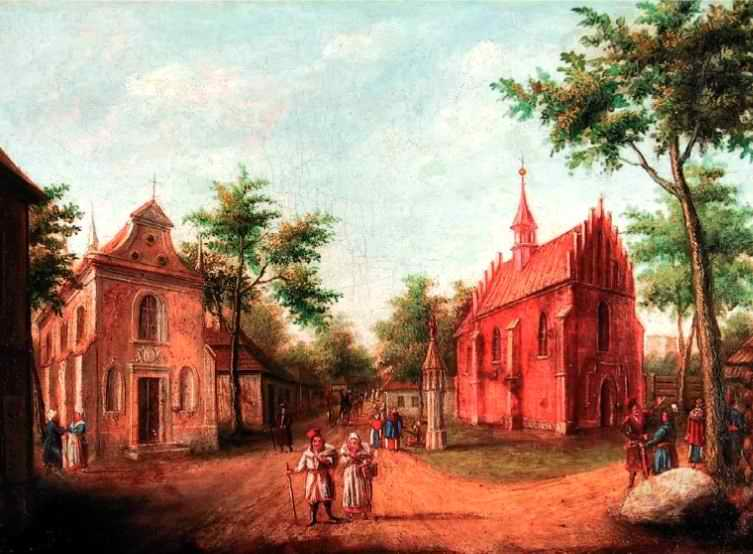
Former churches: on the left St. Cross (Benedictine) and St. Valentine, between them Długa Street. Painting by Teodor Stachowicz circa 1845

Kraków Glagolitic fragment, possibly written at the Kleparz Monastery of Benedictines

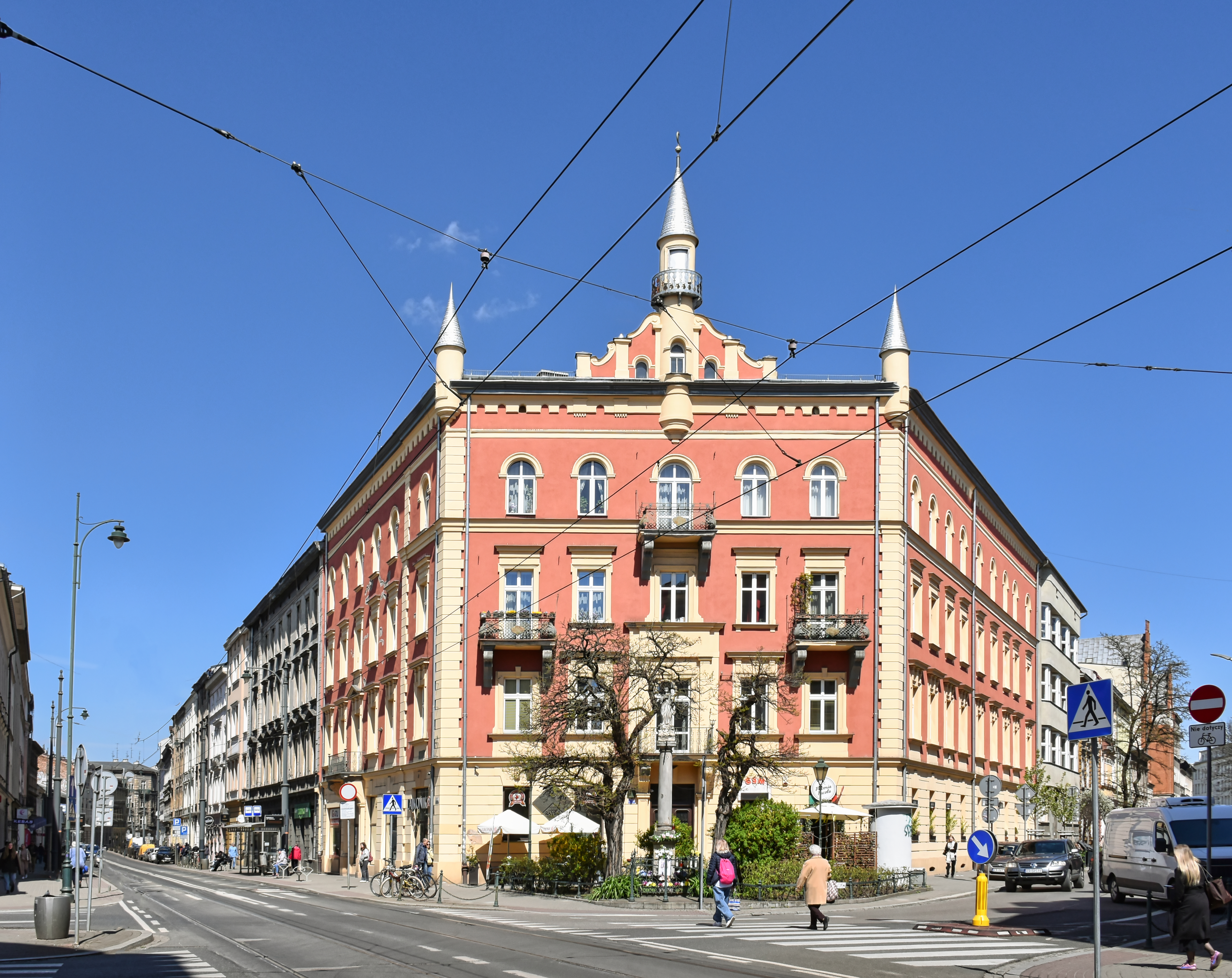
31 Długa Street
The Turkish (Under the Minaret) House in the place where St. Valentine's Church stood

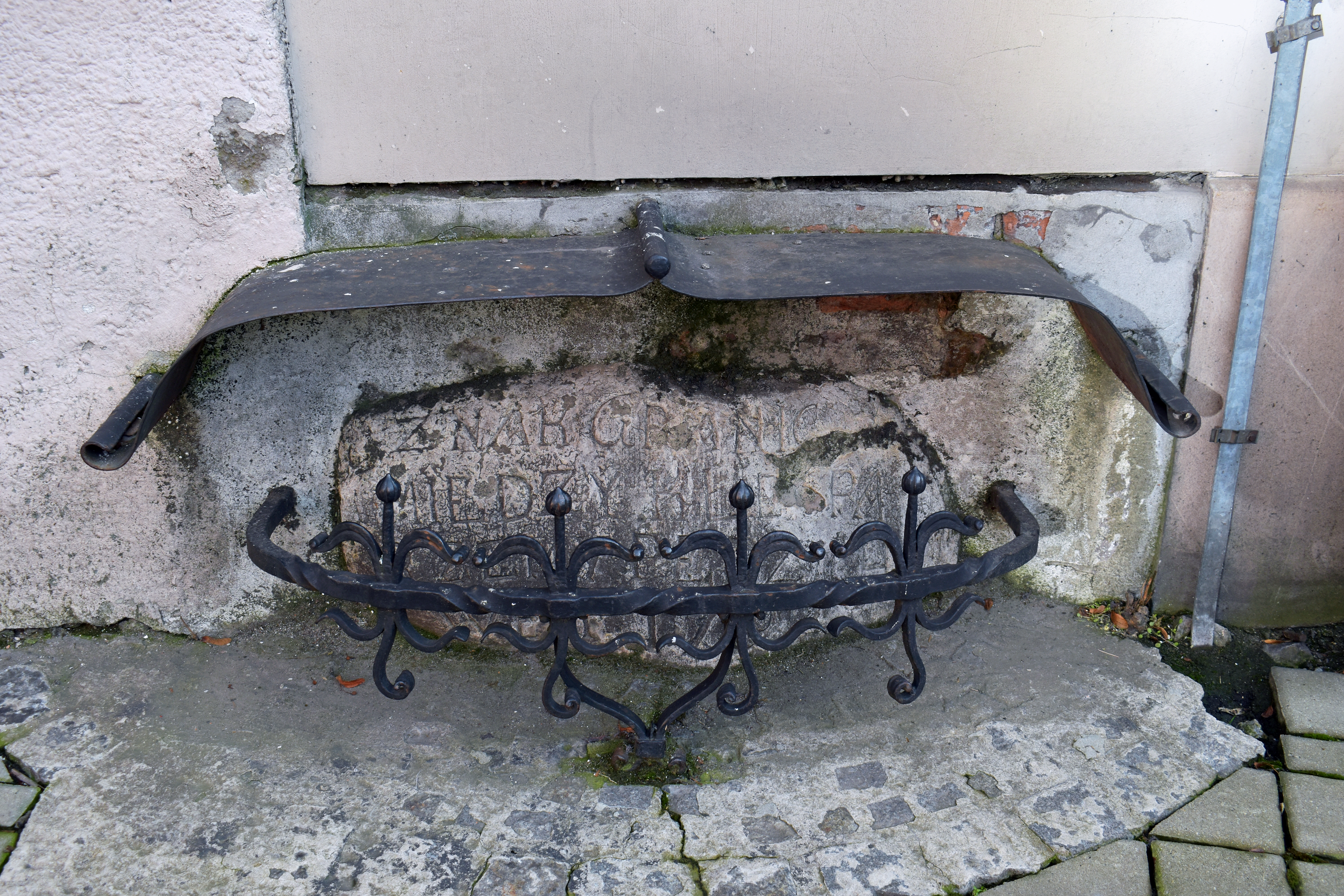
Historic boundary stone between Pędzichów and Kleparz

== Bibliography ==
- (in Polish) * Praca zbiorowa Encyklopedia Krakowa, wydawca Biblioteka Kraków i Muzeum Krakowa, Kraków 2023, ISBN 978-83-66253-46-9 volume I pp 668-670 (Encyclopedia of Krakow)
