= List of presidents of the Royal College of Surgeons in Ireland =

This is a list of presidents of the Royal College of Surgeons in Ireland.

(additional years shown in brackets)

== 1700s ==
- 1784–85 Samuel Croker-King
- 1786 John Whiteway
- 1787 Robert Bowes
- 1788 Philip Woodroffe
- 1789 William Dease
- 1790 Ralph Smith O’bré
- 1791 Francis M'Evoy (1804, 1807)
- 1792 George Stewart (1799)
- 1793 George Renny
- 1794 Solomon Richards (1803, 1808, 1818)
- 1795 Gustavus Hume
- 1795 Clement Archer
- 1796 Francis L'Estrange
- 1797 William Hartigan
- 1798 Robert Moore Peile (1816)
- 1799 George Stewart (1792)

== 1800s ==
- 1800 Sir Henry Jebb
- 1801 James Rivers
- 1802 Abraham Colles (1830)
- 1803 Solomon Richards (1794, 1808, 1818)
- 1804 Francis M'Evoy (1791, 1807)
- 1805 Robert Hamilton
- 1806 Gerard Macklin
- 1807 Francis M'Evoy (1791, 1804)
- 1808 Solomon Richards (1794, 1803, 1818)
- 1809 Richard Dease
- 1810 John Armstrong Garnett
- 1811 Philip Crampton (1820, 1844, 1855)
- 1812 John Creighton (1824)
- 1813 Richard Carmichael (1826, 1845)
- 1814 Cusack Roney (1828)
- 1815 Samuel Wilmot (1832, 1846)
- 1816 Robert Moore Peile (1792)
- 1817 Andrew Johnston
- 1818 Solomon Richards (1794, 1803, 1808)
- 1819 Thomas Hewson
- 1820 Philip Crampton (1811, 1844, 1855)
- 1821 Charles Hawkes Todd
- 1822 James Henthorn
- 1823 John Kirby (1834)
- 1824 John Creighton (1812)
- 1825 Alexander Read (1835)
- 1826 Richard Carmichael (1813, 1845)
- 1827 James William Cusack (1847, 1858)
- 1828 Cusack Roney (1814)
- 1829 William Auchinleck
- 1830 Abraham Colles (1802)
- 1831 Rawdon Macnamara primus
- 1832 Samuel Wilmot (1815, 1846)
- 1833 James Kerin
- 1834 John Kirby (1823)
- 1835 Alexander Read (1825)
- 1836 Francis White
- 1837 Arthur Jacob (1864)
- 1838 William Henry Porter
- 1839 Maurice Collis
- 1840 Robert Adams (1860, 1867)
- 1841 Thomas Rumley
- 1842 William Tagert
- 1843 James O'Beirne
- 1844 Philip Crampton (1811, 1820, 1855)
- 1845 Richard Carmichael (1813, 1826)
- 1846 Samuel Wilmot (1815, 1832)
- 1847 James William Cusack (1827, 1858)
- 1848 Robert Harrison
- 1849 Andrew Ellis
- 1850 Thomas Edward Beatty
- 1903 L. H. Ormsby
