= William Tagert =

Irish surgeon and lecturer (1793–1861)

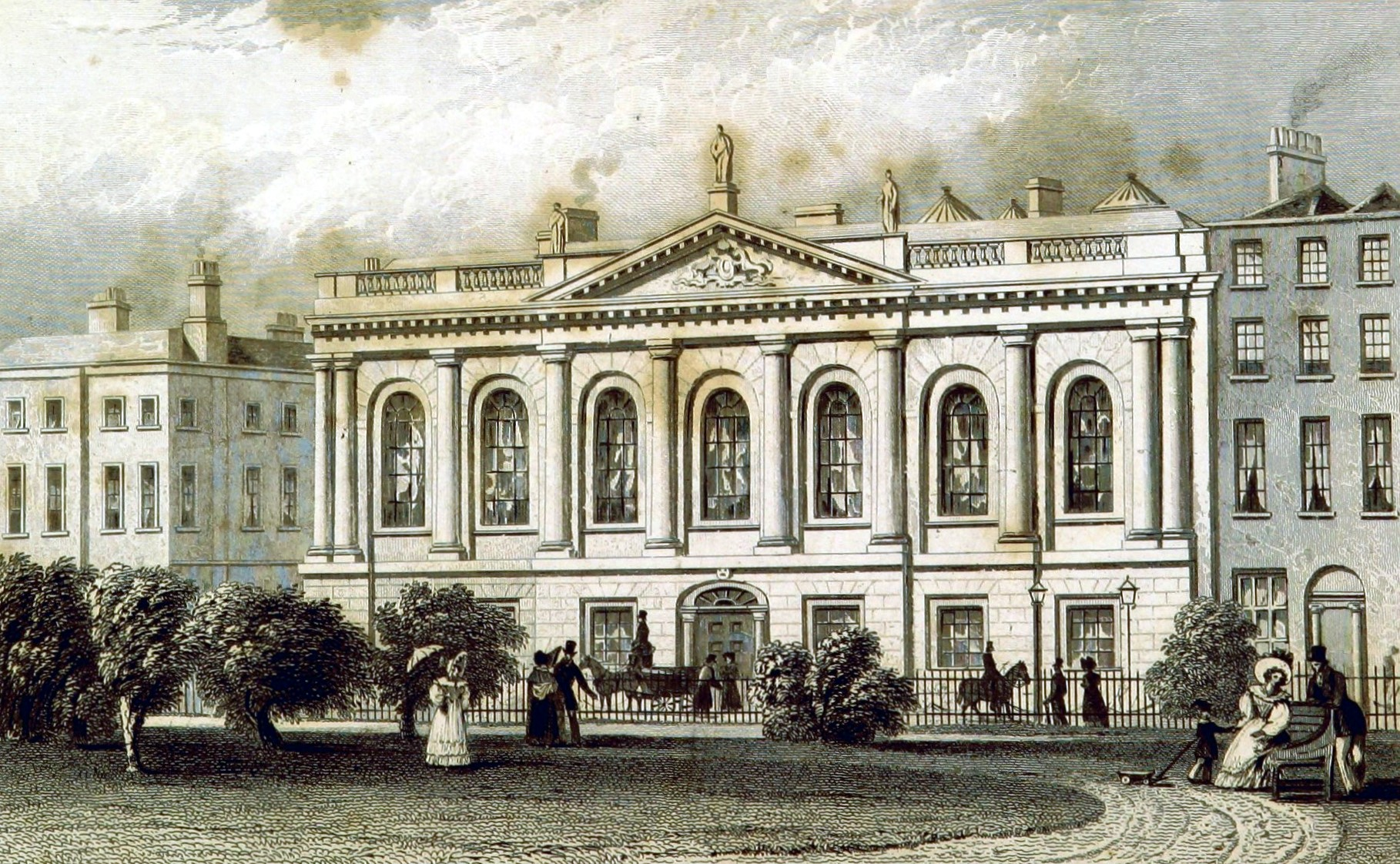
"The College of Surgeons, Dublin". 1837.

William Tagert (1793 – 14 October 1861) was the president of the Royal College of Surgeons in Ireland (RCSI) in 1842.

William Tagert was born in Dublin in 1793. He received his primary education at Nutgrove School, Rathfarnham, Co. Dublin. Tagert was indentured to Sir Henry Jebb in December, 1808, and on Jebb's death in 1811 was transferred to Alexander Read. He became a Licentiate of the RCSI in July 1816, and a Member in November 1819.

He was a surgeon at Mercer's Hospital, and a lecturer on surgery at the original Ledwich School of Medicine. He bequeathed his library to the latter institution. He died after a long illness from paralysis, on 14 October 1861 and was interred in Mount Jerome Cemetery. Tagert never married. He was of a retiring disposition and did not seem to care much for practice. According to Cameron, "he was a good surgeon, and was liked as a lecturer."

== See also ==
- List of presidents of the Royal College of Surgeons in Ireland
