= Philip Woodroffe =

Irish physician, d. 1799

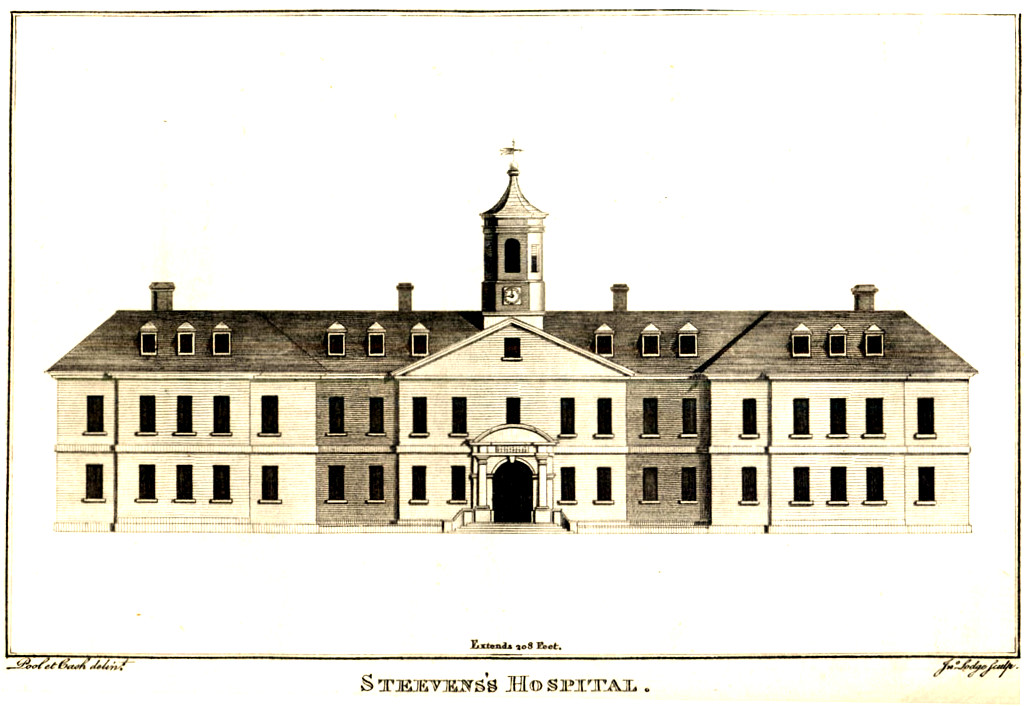
Dr Steevens' Hospital in 1780

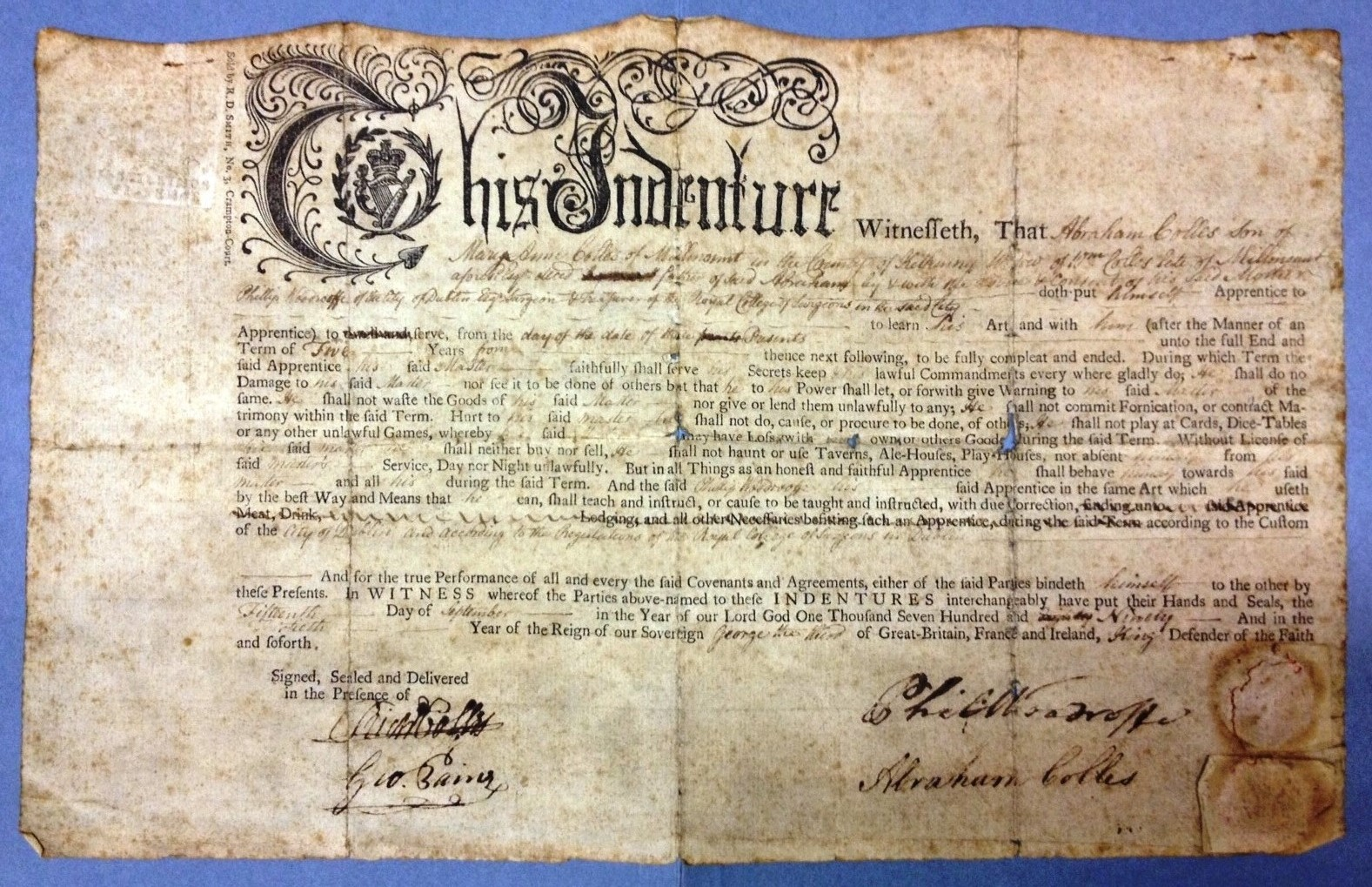
Abraham Colles indenture to Philip Woodroffe, 1790

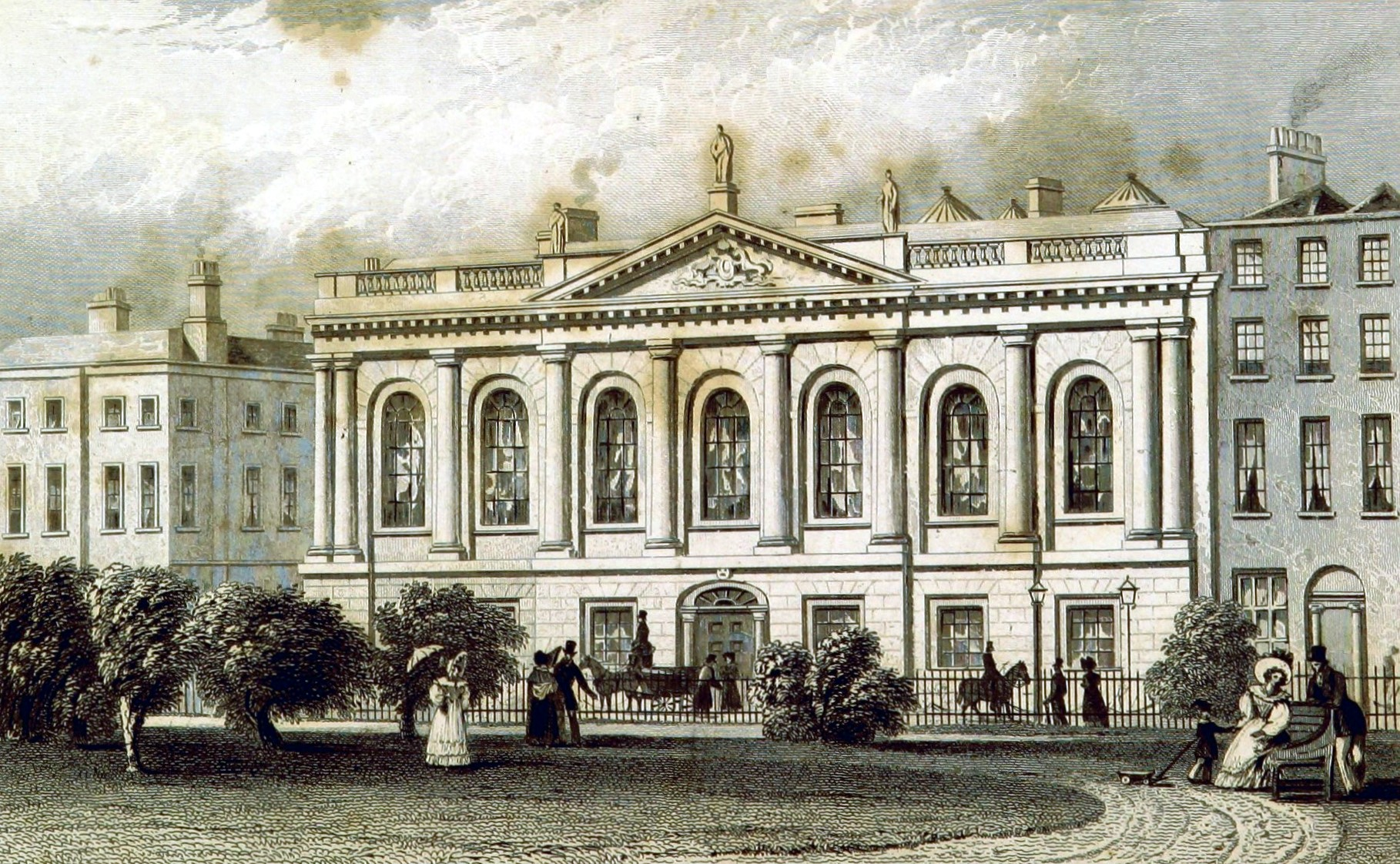
"The College of Surgeons, Dublin" (1837)

Philip Woodroffe (died 4 June 1799) was the resident surgeon at Dr Steevens' Hospital in Dublin for over 30 years. Several surgeons were apprenticed to him. He was the president of the Royal College of Surgeons in Ireland (RCSI) in 1788.

== Early life ==
In his history of the RCSI, Charles Cameron wrote that he had been unable to learn anything about Woodroffe's parents or early life.

== Career ==
Woodroffe was appointed assistant-surgeon to Dr Steevens' Hospital in 1763, and resident surgeon from 1765, an office which he held until his death.

Woodroffe was one of 49 physicians and chirurgeons who declared their public support for the construction of a Publick Bath in Dublin in May 1771 and named Achmet Borumborad as a well-qualified individual for carrying such a scheme into existence.

In 1780 he became surgeon at the House of Industry Hospitals and remained so for the rest of his life. In 1769 he was living in Crow Street; he moved to Fownes Street in 1774, and in 1784 he was living in St Andrew's Street.

He was one of the founding members of the Dublin Society of Surgeons that later became the Royal College of Surgeons in Ireland, and was one of those to whom the first charter was granted in 1784. In 1786 he followed William Dease as treasurer to the college, and held the office for eight years. He was president of the college in 1788. Woodroffe's appointments also included surgeon to the Blue Coat School, the Foundling Hospital, and the Hospital for Incurables, Lazar's Hill (now Townsend Street). Several notable surgeons such as Abraham Colles were apprenticed to him. Colles took over as resident surgeon at Steevens' Hospital after Woodroffe's death in 1799.

== Death ==
Woodroffe died on 4 June 1799, in St Andrew's Street, and was interred in St. Andrew's churchyard.

John Gilborne wrote the following verse about Woodroffe:

"Woodroffe redresses all chirurgic Woes,
Amputated stumps he covers with Lambeaux, (Note: French: "Lambeaux means flaps of skin".)
To make the maim'd live out their Time with ease:
A Practice quite unknown in ancient days."
