= Robert Harrison (surgeon) =

17th century Irish surgeon

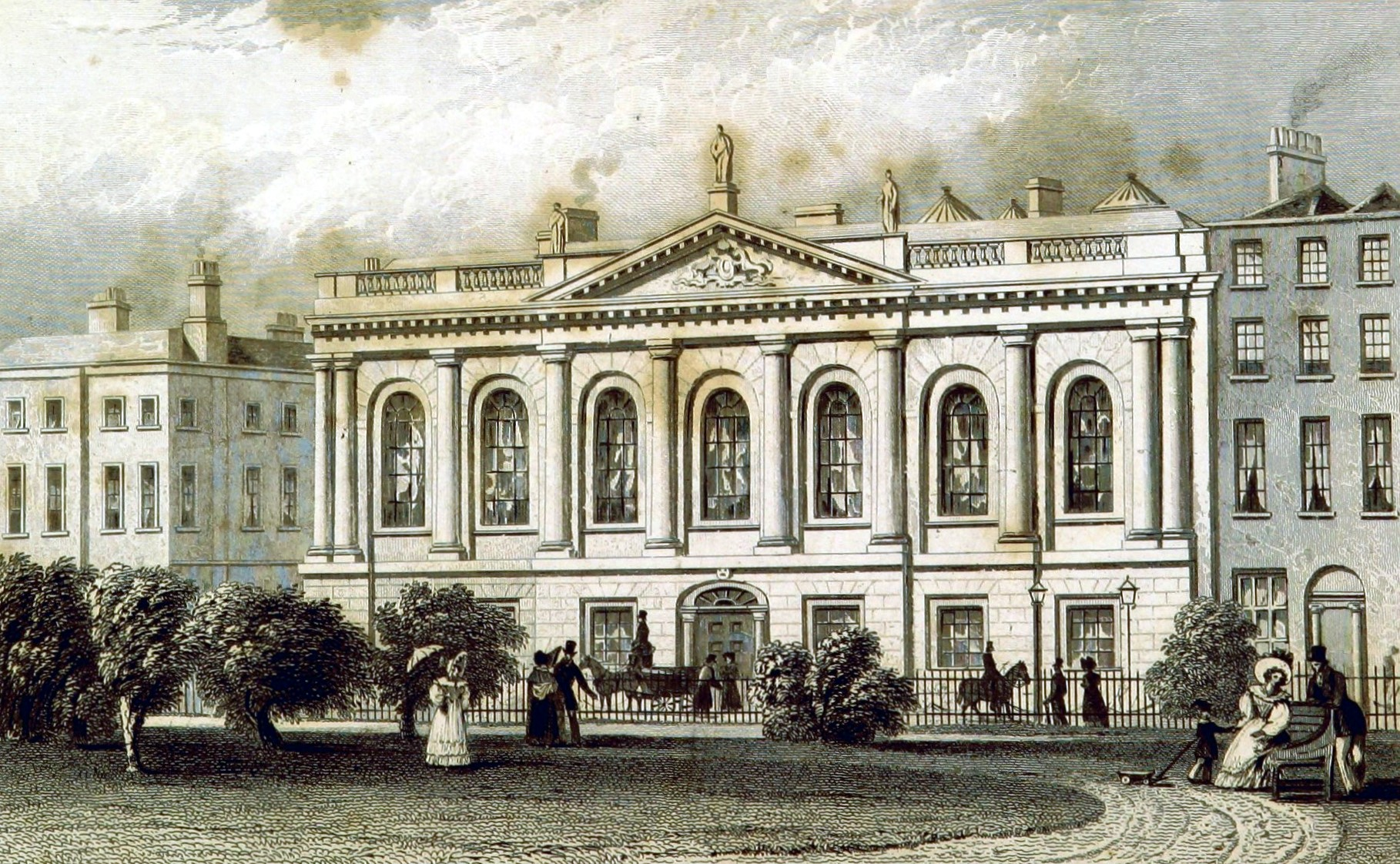
"The College of Surgeons, Dublin". 1837.

Robert Harrison (1793 – 23 April 1858) M.R.C.S. I., M.R.I.A. was an Irish surgeon and anatomist. He was the president of the Royal College of Surgeons in Ireland (RCSI) in 1848.

== Biography ==
Robert Harrison was born in Cumberland, England, in 1793 and was sent to study at Trinity College Dublin, where he graduated with a degree in the arts. He was indentured to the surgeon Abraham Colles and commenced medical studies in the RCSI medical school.

== Career ==
In 1818, Harrison was elected a member of RCSI. In 1817, he was appointed Demonstrator in RCSI and was elected Professor of Anatomy and Physiology at Trinity College Dublin in 1827. In 1824, he took the degree of M.B., and in 1837 that of M.D. He was appointed Professor of Anatomy and Surgery in the School of Physics at Trinity College Dublin in 1837.

He was a surgeon at Dr Steevens' Hospital and a consultant surgeon at Jervis Street Charitable Infirmary. Harrison was for many years one of the Honorary Secretaries to the Royal Dublin Society.

Harrison published Surgical Anatomy of the Arteries in two volumes in 1824, and it was considered a significant textbook at the time, running five editions. This was followed by another textbook, The Dublin Dissector Manual of Anatomy, later editions of which were published in London and New York.

== See also ==
- List of presidents of the Royal College of Surgeons in Ireland
