= John Garnett =

John Garnett may refer to:

- John Garnett (bishop) (died 1782), English bishop of Clogher in the Church of Ireland
- John B. Garnett (born 1940), mathematician
- John Armstrong Garnett (1767–1831), president of the Royal College of Surgeons in Ireland
- John Garnett CBE (1921–1997), head of The Industrial Society
