= John Kirby (surgeon) =

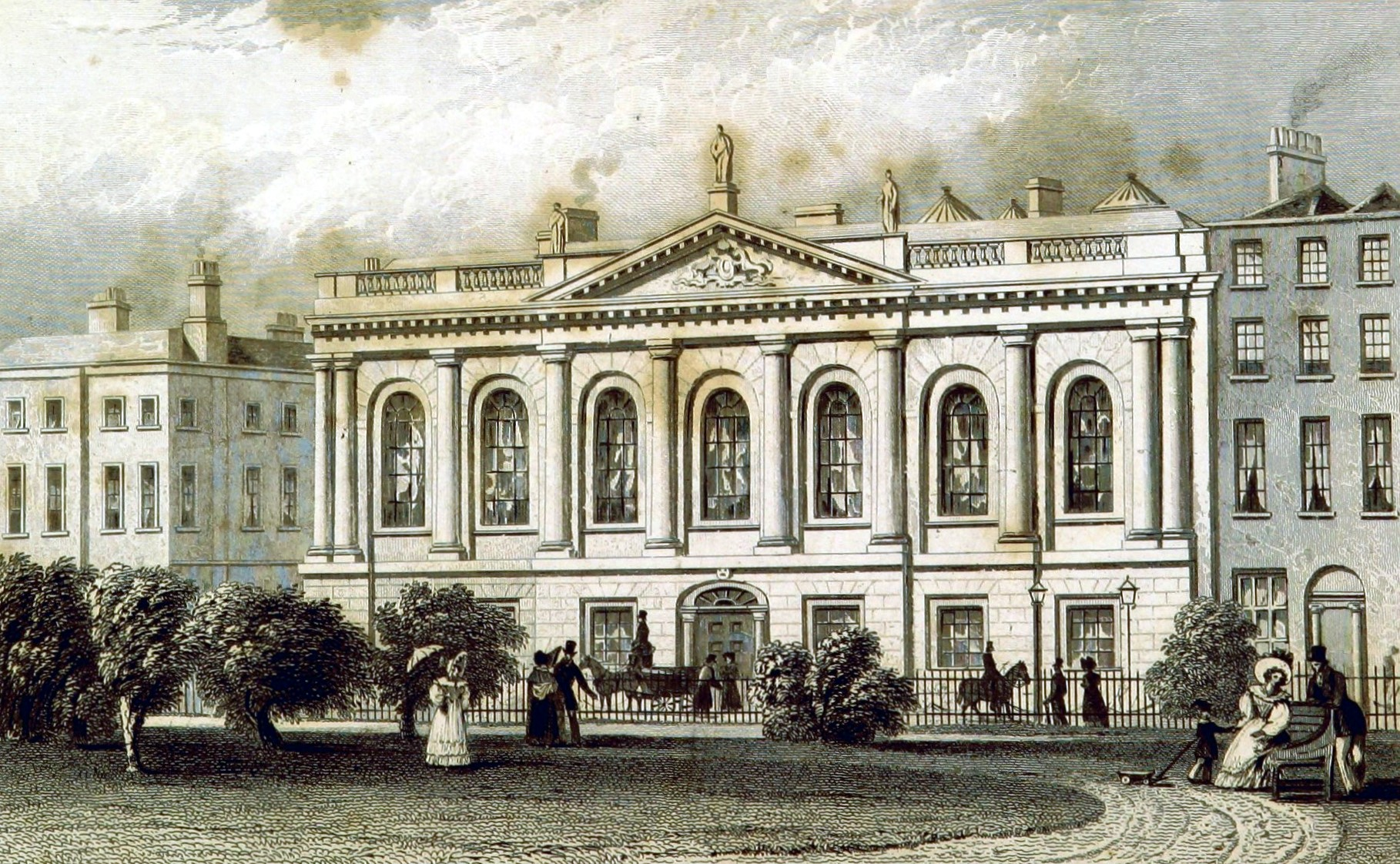
"The College of Surgeons, Dublin". 1837.

John Timothy Kirby (1781 – 26 May 1853) was the president of the Royal College of Surgeons in Ireland (RCSI) in 1823 and 1834.

Kirby obtained the Letters Testimonial of the Royal College of Surgeons in Ireland (RCSI) on 19 March 1805, and the Membership on 5 September 1808. In 1805 he graduated B.A., and, later in 1832, LL.B. and LL.D. in Dublin University. He had a large medical practice as well as a surgical one.

Kirby was appointed Demonstrator in Anatomy in the RCSI in 1809 by Professors William Dease and Abraham Colles. Kirby then established a private medical school with Alexander Read called the 'Theatre of Anatomy' and it was located on Stephens Street. After the first course of lectures ended in 1810 the school moved to Peter Street. By 1812 Kirby was the sole proprietor of the 'Theatre of Anatomy and School of Surgery'. The school flourished and Kirby's lectures on gunshot wounds became well known and well attended. This was a time of war in Europe so these battle field skills were highly sought. In order for his pupils to provide evidence of hospital attendance during their studies, Kirby set up a small hospital beside the school in 1811 called St. Peter's and St. Bridget's Hospital. Despite tense relations between Abraham Colles and himself, Kirby was a well-respected surgeon and lecturer. He regularly attended medical meetings and discussions. So in 1823 he was elected President of the RCSI. After his presidency Kirby proposed that a National Surgical Hospital be established under the management of the college. He then published a pamphlet arguing that a national hospital would be more beneficial to the people of Ireland than extending a museum. This extension was, of course, what the college was considering doing at that time. Having antagonised his colleagues, the proposal was not passed.

By 1832 Kirby had been to appointed to the Chair of Medicine in RCSI. With this new position Kirby closed his private medical school and presented his museum to RCSI. In 1834 Kirby was elected President of the college for a second time.

== See also ==
- List of presidents of the Royal College of Surgeons in Ireland
