= Thomas Rumley =

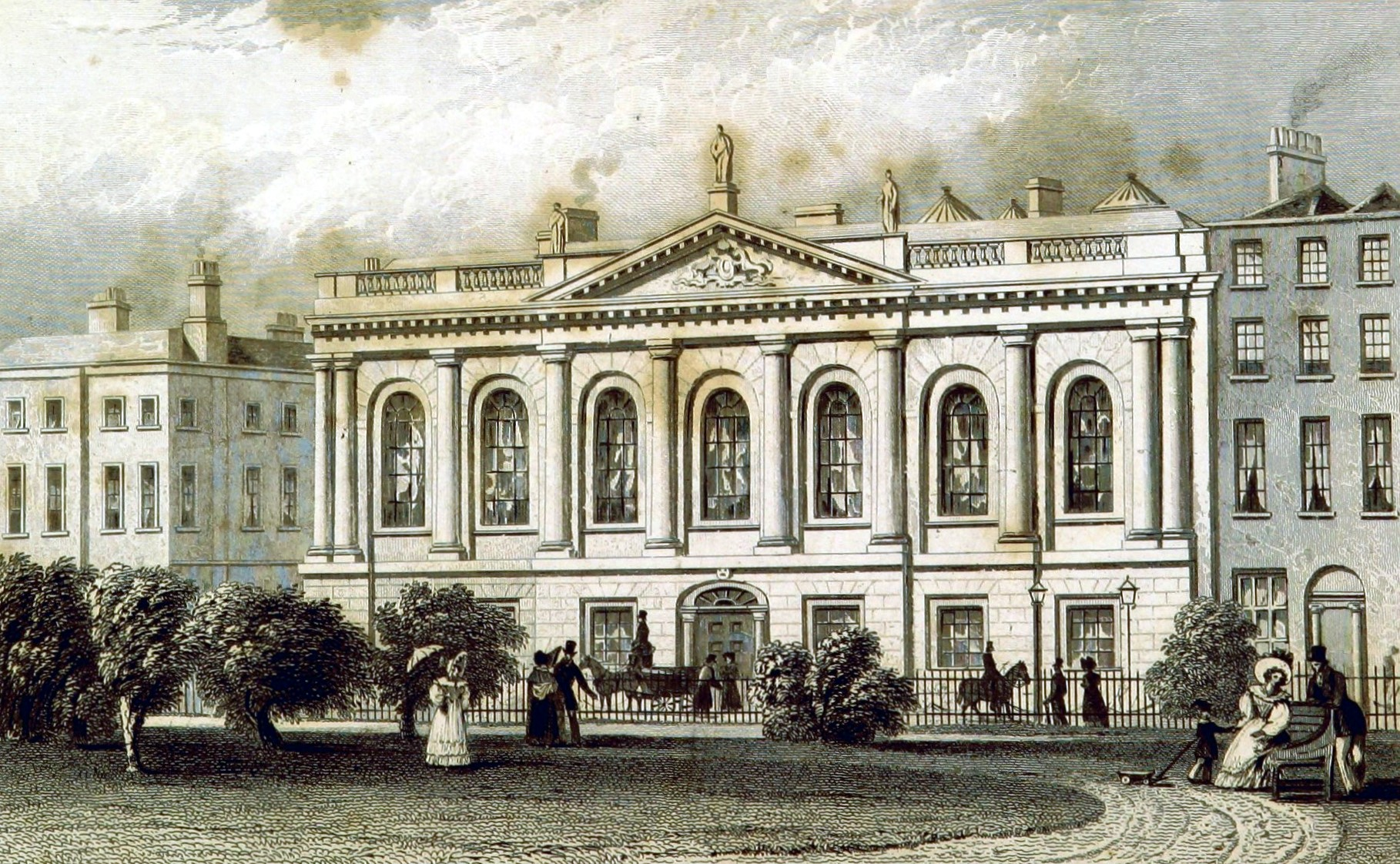
"The College of Surgeons, Dublin". 1837.

Thomas Rumley (c. 1792 – March 1856) was the president of the Royal College of Surgeons in Ireland (RCSI) in 1841.

He was born in Dublin, the son of port inspector Forward Rumley. In April 1811, he was indentured to John Kirby, and studied in the College and Kirby's schools. On 25 June 1815, he passed the Licentiate at RCSI, and on 9 November 1818, he was elected a Member. He engaged in surgical and medical practice, but did not become attached to any hospital.

In 1832 Rumley and A. Stokes were deputed to investigate a case of supposed cholera at Kingstown. Although neither of them had any previous experience of the disease, they pronounced the case to be one of Asiatic cholera. The inhabitants were annoyed that their town should be pronounced infected with cholera, and an infuriated mob attacked Stokes and Rumley, who narrowly escaped with their lives. Soon after this event cholera became epidemic in Ireland.

== Death ==
Having long suffered severely from gout, he died at his residence, 37 York-street, in March, 1856, and was interred on the 30th of that month in Glasnevin Cemetery.

== See also ==
- List of presidents of the Royal College of Surgeons in Ireland
