= Henthorn =

Henthorn is a surname. Notable people with the surname include:

- James Henthorn (1744–1832), Irish surgeon
- Karen Henthorn (born 1963), English actress

== Fictional ==
- Sean Henthorn, a character in Jericho

== See also ==
- Henthorn v Fraser
