= William Auchinleck =

Irish surgeon, President of the RCSI

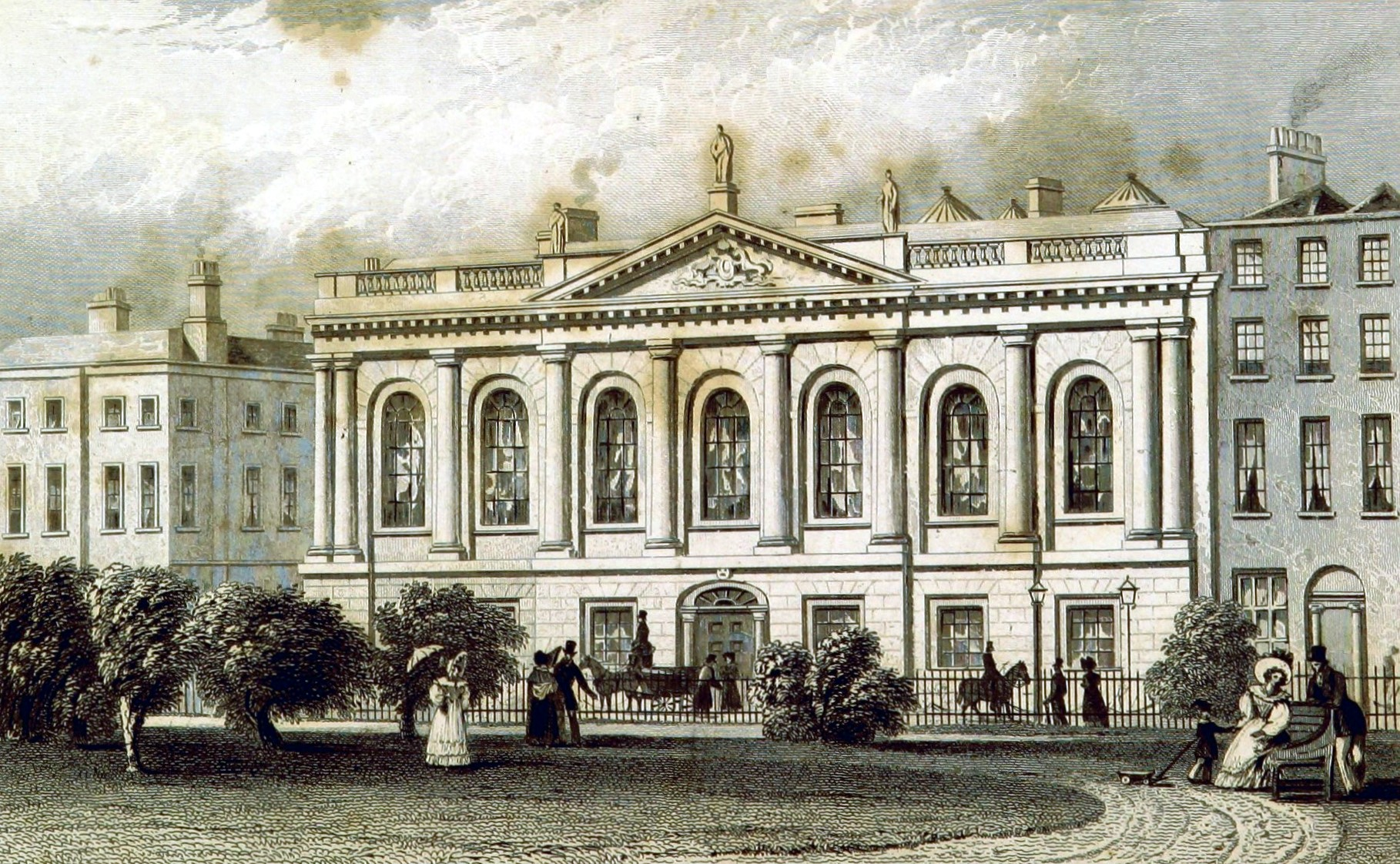
"The College of Surgeons, Dublin". 1837.

William Auchinleck (19 May 1787 – 27 December 1848) was the president of the Royal College of Surgeons in Ireland (RCSI) in 1829.

W. Auchinleck was born in Dublin on 19 May 1787. On 6 August 1802, Auchinleck was indentured to Gerard Macklin, and commenced his studies at the College of Surgeons and Mercer's Hospital. On 23 June 1810, he became a licentiate, and on 7 April a member of the College. He was appointed a Surgeon to Mercer's Hospital, in which institution, about the year 1842, he successfully removed the inferior' maxillary bone, the patient making a good recovery; this was the first occasion upon which this operation was performed in Dublin. Auchinleck was Lecturer on Surgery in the Dublin School of Medicine. He died, suddenly, on 27 December 1848, and was interred in St. Michan's churchyard.

== See also ==
- List of presidents of the Royal College of Surgeons in Ireland
