= Richard Dease =

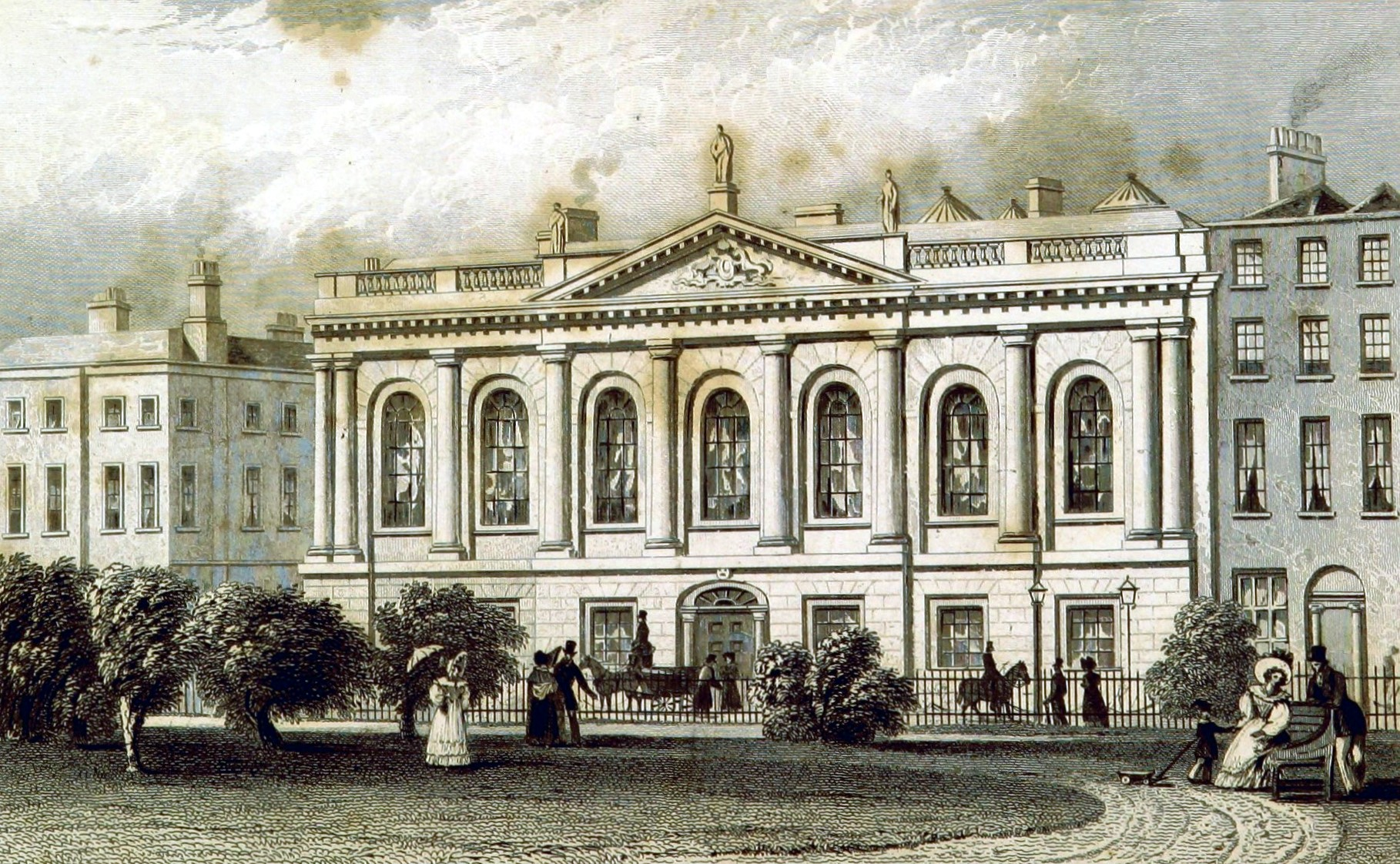
"The College of Surgeons, Dublin". 1837.

Richard Dease (c. 1774 – 21 February 1819) was the president of the Royal College of Surgeons in Ireland (RCSI) in 1809.

Richard Dease was born in Dublin about the year 1774. His father was William Dease, the eminent surgeon, one of the founders of the Royal College of Surgeons in Ireland.

Dease was educated in Trinity College Dublin, and graduated with a BA in 1794. Having been indentured to his father on 1 September 1790, he prosecuted his medical studies in the RCSI and the Meath Hospital. He also spent some time in the London hospitals and at the University of Edinburgh, in which he graduated with an MD On 3 September 1795, he obtained the Letters Testimonial of RCSI and in the same year succeeded Israel Read as Surgeon to the Meath Hospital. On 12 September, and only nine days after passing as a licentiate, he was elected a member of the College, and on the death of his father he succeeded him in the Chairs of Anatomy and Surgery in the College School. Dease was a thoroughly educated man, an accomplished anatomist, and a skilful surgeon.

On Saturday, 13 February 1819, Dease was lecturing to his class on the cervical nerves and brachial plexus. The subject was a woman who had been dead less than 48 hours, and who had died from a pulmonary affection. He appears to have had his skin slightly abraded during the demonstration. The next morning he awoke early ill, having violent shivering and a sick stomach. He soon developed the most severe symptoms of blood poisoning, and died on 21 February, in the house in Sackville Street which he had inherited from his father.

== See also ==
- List of presidents of the Royal College of Surgeons in Ireland
