= Maurice Collis (surgeon) =

Irish surgeon, President of the RSCI

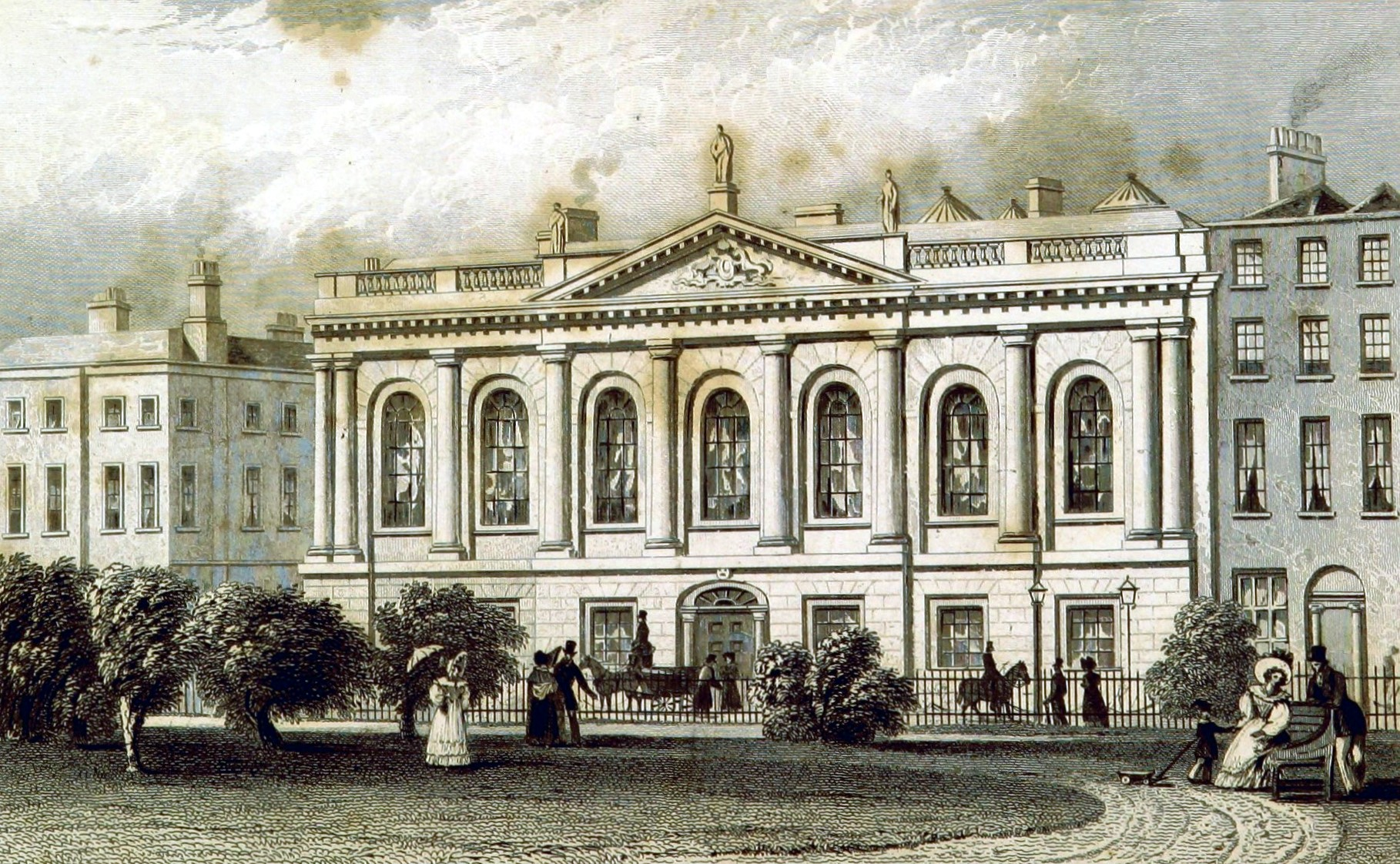
"The College of Surgeons, Dublin". 1837.

Maurice Collis (1791 – March 1852) was the president of the Royal College of Surgeons in Ireland (RCSI) in 1839.

Maurice Collis was born in 1791 at No. 20 York-street, Dublin. He entered TCD, and graduated B.A. in 1813. In November 1810 he was apprenticed to Thomas Hewson and he became a pupil in the RCSI Medical School and the Meath Hospital. He received his Licentiate in 1815, and was elected a Member of the RCSI on 4 May 1818. In 1816 he was appointed Demonstrator in the College School, and in 1825 he succeeded Thomas Roney as Surgeon to the Meath Hospital—a ward in that institution was dedicated to his memory at the time. In 1833 he took the degree of MA. He married Frances Diana, daughter of Archdeacon Herbert. His death, caused by asthma, occurred in March, 1852, at 66 Lower Baggot-street.

== See also ==
- List of presidents of the Royal College of Surgeons in Ireland
