= James Rivers =

James Rivers may refer to:

- James Rivers (politician), English politician
- James Rivers (surgeon), president of the Royal College of Surgeons in Ireland
- Jamie Rivers, Canadian ice hockey coach, executive and player
- Jamie Rivers (American football), American football linebacker

== See also ==
- James River (disambiguation)
