= Francis White (surgeon) =

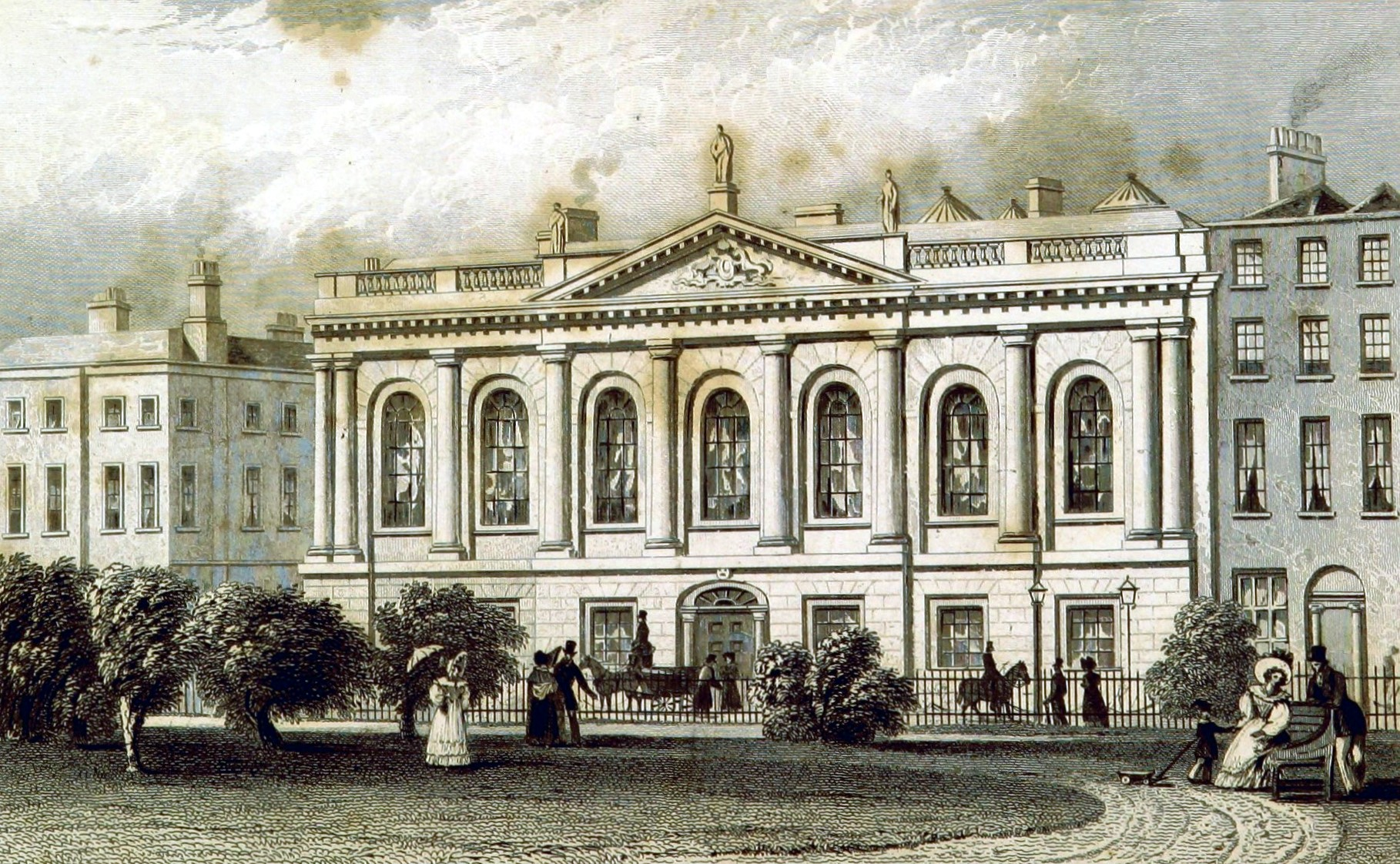
"The College of Surgeons, Dublin". 1837.

Francis White (1787 – August 1859) was the president of the Royal College of Surgeons in Ireland (RCSI) in 1836.

Francis White was indentured to Abraham Colles on 17 March 1807, and for some time was a resident pupil in Steevens' Hospital and a student in the RCSI School. He was elected a Member on 1 May 1815. He established a Hospital for Diseases of the Eye on Lower Ormond Quay and subsequently added to it a small anatomical school. During the cholera epidemic of 1832, he was very active and was for several years Secretary to the Board of Health.

In 1841 he was appointed Inspector-General of Prisons and was subsequently the first Inspector of Lunatic Asylums under the County Asylums Act 1845 (8 & 9 Vict. c. 126). White had initiated a campaign to secure medical participation in the treatment of the mentally ill years before the 1845 act. As Inspector-General of Prisons, White had seen this as a step towards a medical professional being appointed to a similar role for asylums. White believed that if mentally ill patients were treated with kindness, comfort, and understanding it would most likely give good results. Also, by looking at patients from a medical point of view the little scientific knowledge of mental illness available at that time could be built upon.

== See also ==
- List of presidents of the Royal College of Surgeons in Ireland
