= James Kerin =

Irish physician

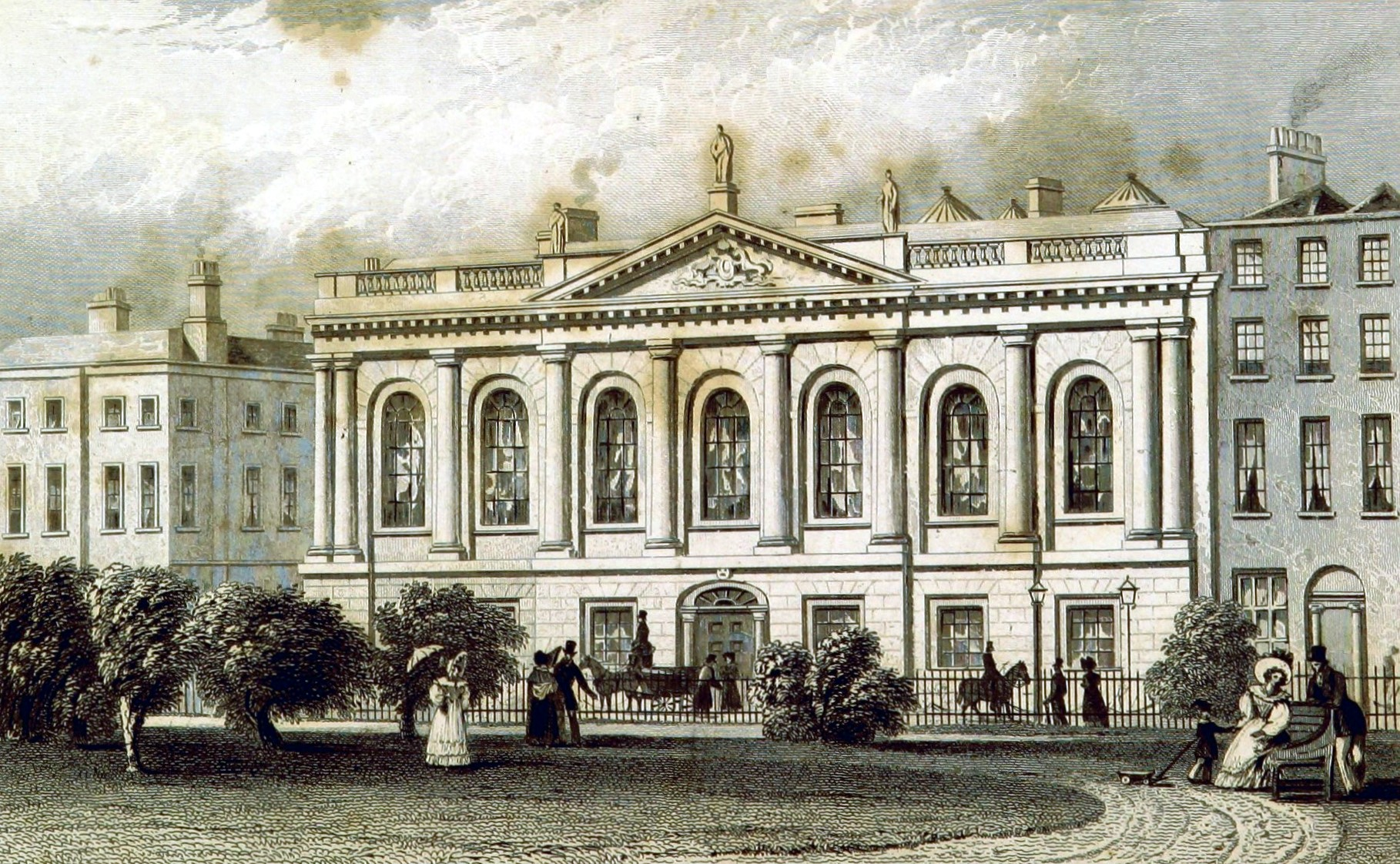
"The College of Surgeons, Dublin". 1837.

James Kerin (c. 1779 – 17 March 1848) was an Irish medical doctor who was the president of the Royal College of Surgeons in Ireland (RCSI) in 1833.

In 1806 Kerin was indentured to Peter Harkan, and later obtained the licence of the RCSI in 1813 and he was elected a member in 1815. For many years he acted as surgeon to the General Post Office, and in 1836, on the institution of the Irish Constabulary, he was appointed surgeon to that force.

Kerin worked at the Dublin General Dispensary. The dispensary had been established in 1785 under the patronage of the Duke of Leinster and Lord Donoughmore, acting as president and vice-president respectively. It was funded by voluntary subscription. Doctors, unlike the apothecaries in the Dublin dispensaries would not have received pay. Kerin remained at the dispensary for most of his working life and retired in 1841. He remained consulting surgeon there until not long before his death. He died from pneumonia, at the Constabulary Barracks, Phoenix Park, on 17 March 1848, aged 68.

== See also ==
- List of presidents of the Royal College of Surgeons in Ireland
