= Thomas Edward Beatty =

Irish surgeon, President of the RCSI

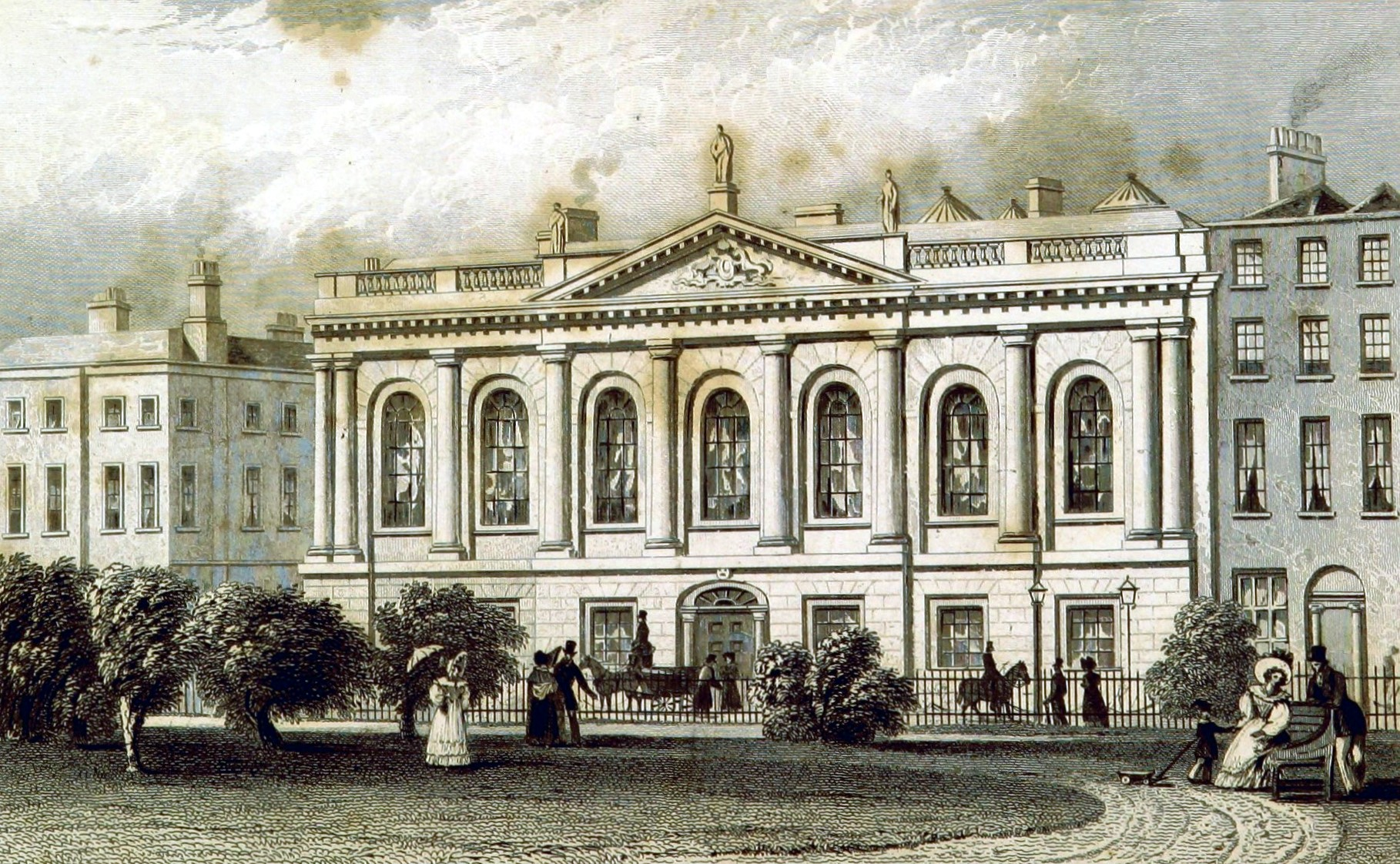
"The College of Surgeons, Dublin". 1837.

Thomas Edward Beatty (1800 – 3 May 1872) was an Irish physician, and the president of the Royal College of Surgeons in Ireland (RCSI) in 1850.

== Biography ==
T.E. Beatty was educated at Trinity College Dublin where he graduated with a BA in 1818, going on to study medicine at the University of Edinburgh graduating with an MD in 1820. In 1824 he was elected a Member of the Royal College of Surgeons of Ireland.

Beatty practiced as an obstetrician and he was appointed Professor of Medical Jurisprudence RCSI and later Professor of Midwifery in 1842. He was for some time a lecturer in midwifery at the Park-street School, and Lecturer on Medical Jurisprudence in the Richmond Hospital School. He was one of the founders of the City of Dublin Hospital.

In the 1860s Beatty became more involved with the Royal College of Physicians of Ireland (RCPI) and in 1862 he was elected an Honorary Fellow of RCPI. He consequently resigned his Fellowship of the RCSI and he was elected President of the Royal College of Physicians of Ireland in 1864, the only person to hold the Presidency of both Royal Colleges. Beatty enjoyed professional recognition and a full social life. He received an Honorary MD degree from Trinity College Dublin, was President of the Dublin Pathological Society and the Dublin Obstetrical Society. He was vice-president of the Zoology Society and Secretary of the Medico-Philosophical Society.

== See also ==
- List of presidents of the Royal College of Surgeons in Ireland
