= Andrew Ellis (surgeon) =

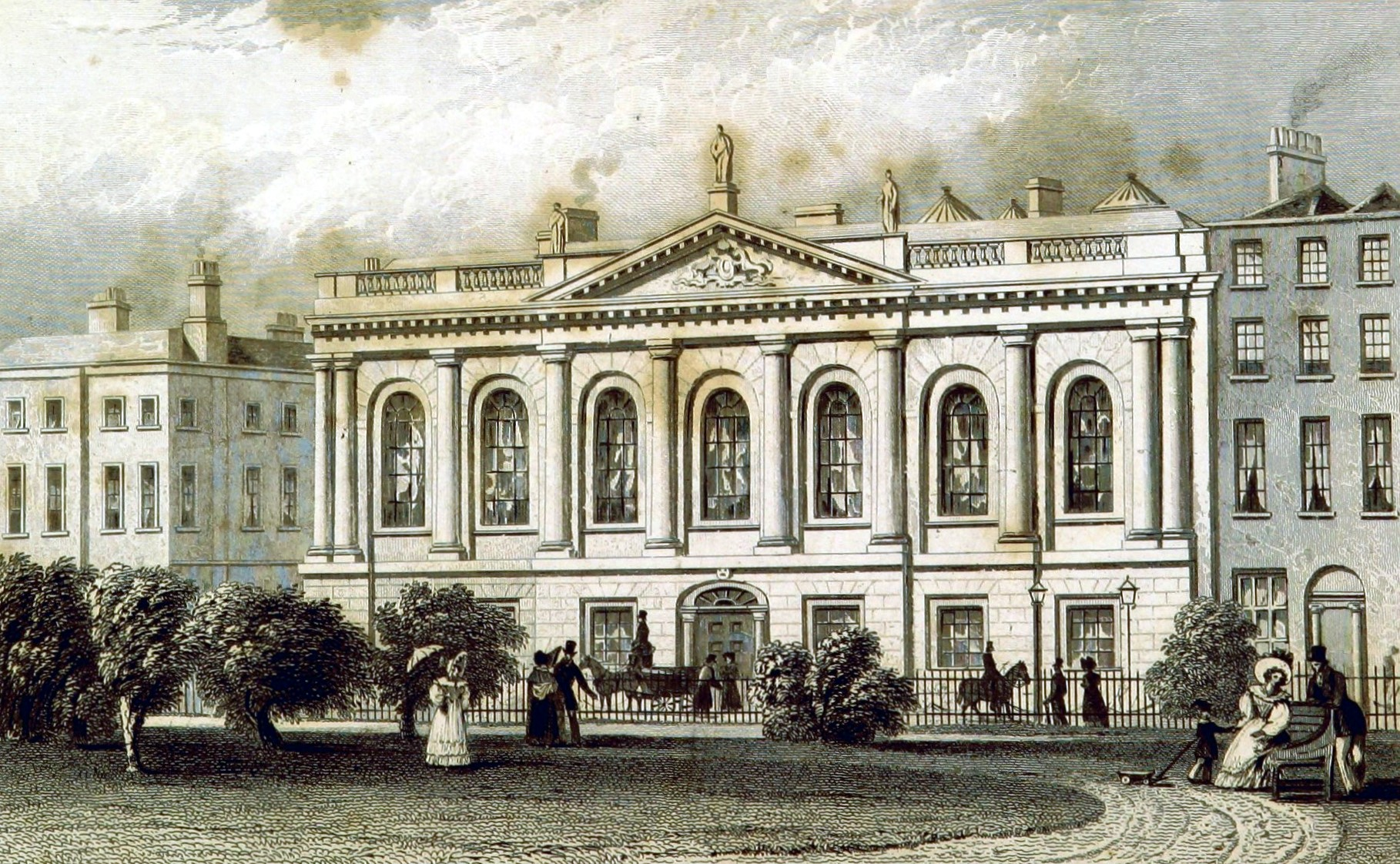
"The College of Surgeons, Dublin". 1837.

Andrew Ellis (1792 – 6 May 1867) was the president of the Royal College of Surgeons in Ireland (RCSI) in 1849.

Andrew Ellis was born in Kilpool in County Wicklow. He studied medicine at the RCSI school, at the Meath Hospital and at Sir Patrick Dun's Hospital. He received the LRCSI in 1820 and in 1827 Ellis was elected a Member of the RCSI. In conjunction with his appointment as Surgeon to St. Mary's Hospital Dublin, he also taught anatomy in the Peter Street Medical School. In 1837 Ellis was appointed Professor of Surgery to the Apothecaries' Hall and he was subsequently Professor of Surgery in the Catholic University Medical School. Ellis contributed to the Dublin medical press and in 1846 he published a monograph on clinical surgery. Ellis also served as Surgeon to Jervis Street Hospital and to Maynooth College.

== See also ==
- List of presidents of the Royal College of Surgeons in Ireland
