= Samuel Wilmot =

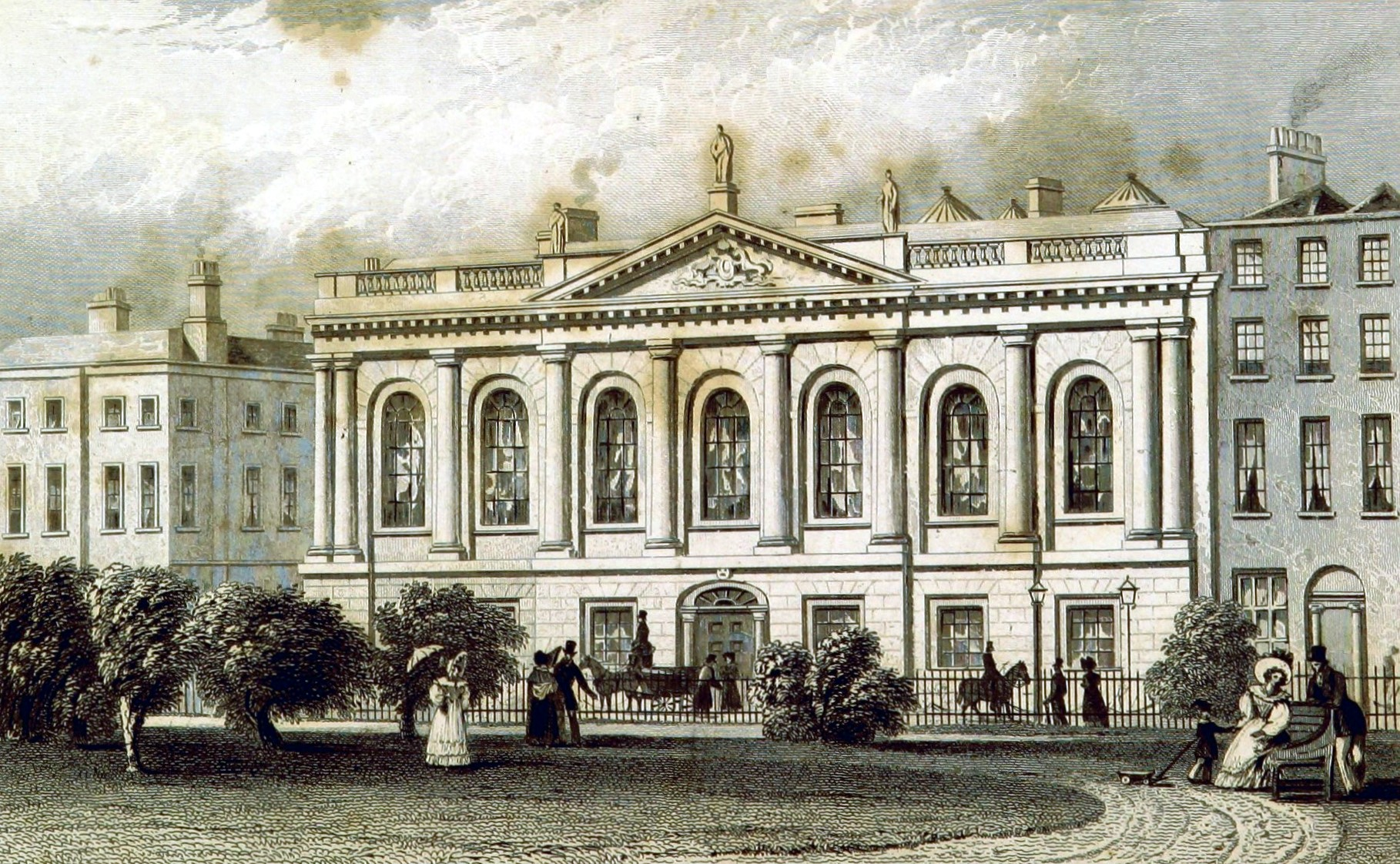
"The College of Surgeons, Dublin". 1837.

Samuel Wilmot (June 1772 – November 9, 1848) MD MRCSI was the president of the Royal College of Surgeons in Ireland (RCSI) in 1815, 1832 and 1846.

== Biography ==
Wilmot entered Trinity College Dublin (TCD) in 1790 to study medicine. He graduated MD and was indentured to William Hartigan, Professor of Anatomy and Surgery in TCD. Wilmot's first appointment was to the Meath Dispensary and in 1807 he was elected Surgeon to Mercer's Hospital. He was later appointed Surgeon to Dr. Steevens' Hospital. Subsequently, he held positions in the Lock, Sir Patrick Dun's, and Cork street Hospitals. He was also consulting surgeon to the City of Dublin Hospital, and surgeon to the Hospital for Incurables. In 1824, he founded the Park Street School of Medicine, and in 1826 was appointed Professor of Anatomy and Surgery to the Royal College of Surgeons in Ireland.

He resigned his professorship in 1848 and died on 9 November of that year.

His obituary stated that Wilmot's expertise "was diseases of the urinary and genital organs, in the treatment of which few, if any, excelled him. The delicacy of manipulation with which he managed such cases was only equaled by the sound practical knowledge and great experience which guided him. The greater portion of his department of the surgical course, at the College of Surgeons, consisted of the description and management of those affections."

== See also ==
- List of presidents of the Royal College of Surgeons in Ireland
