= John Gilborne =

18th-century Irish physician and poet

John Gilborne (fl. 1770/80s) was an Irish physician and poet. He lived in Vicar Street, off Thomas Street, in Dublin.

Gilborne's best known poetry is The Medical Review which was a source for Charles Cameron's biographical sketches in his history of the Royal College of Surgeons in Ireland.

== Selected works ==
- The Medical Review, a poem; Being a panecyric on the faculty of Dublin; physicians, surgeons, and apothecaries, marching in procession to the temple of fame (1775)
- The Triumphant Return, a Poem; In Latin and English: Humbly Dedicated to His Excellency George Grenville Nugent Temple (1788)
- De regis convalescentia: On the king's recovery, an allegorical poem: in Latin and English. Alluding to the arms, crests, supporters, and mottos of the nobility of Great Britain and Ireland. (1789)
