= Gerard Macklin =

Irish surgeon (c. 1767–1848)

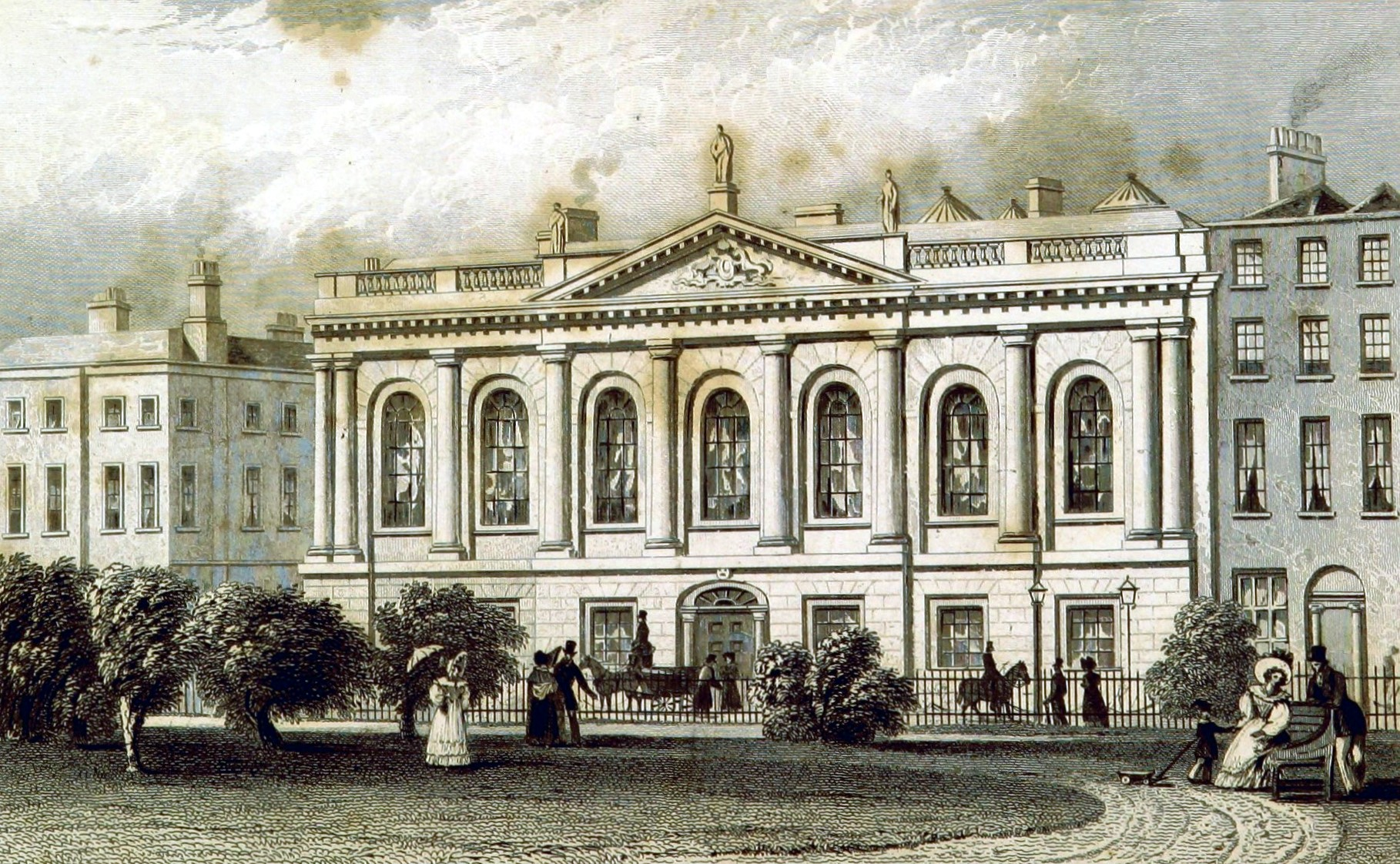
"The College of Surgeons, Dublin". 1837.

Gerard Macklin (c.1767 – 9 August 1848) was the president of the Royal College of Surgeons in Ireland (RCSI) in 1806.

According to Sir Charles Cameron, Macklin "was born about the year 1767. He was indentured for seven years on the 1st of August, 1784, to Surgeon R. Daniel, of 43 South King-street. On the 4th November, 1791, he was admitted a licentiate of The Royal College of Surgeons in Ireland, and was elected a member on the 22nd of the following month. In 1795 he was appointed Surgeon to Simpson's Hospital, and the following year became connected with Mercer's Hospital as Assistant-Surgeon, and subsequently was promoted to be Surgeon. He was also Surgeon to the Dublin General Dispensary. On the 22nd October, 1806, he was appointed State Surgeon (page 106). He died on the 9th August, 1848, at Lake Park, County of Wicklow, at the age of eighty-one. Macklin had a large practice, and was considered to be an expert lithotomist."

== See also ==
- List of presidents of the Royal College of Surgeons in Ireland
