= Robert Bowes (surgeon) =

Irish surgeon; founder member of the RCSI, later its President

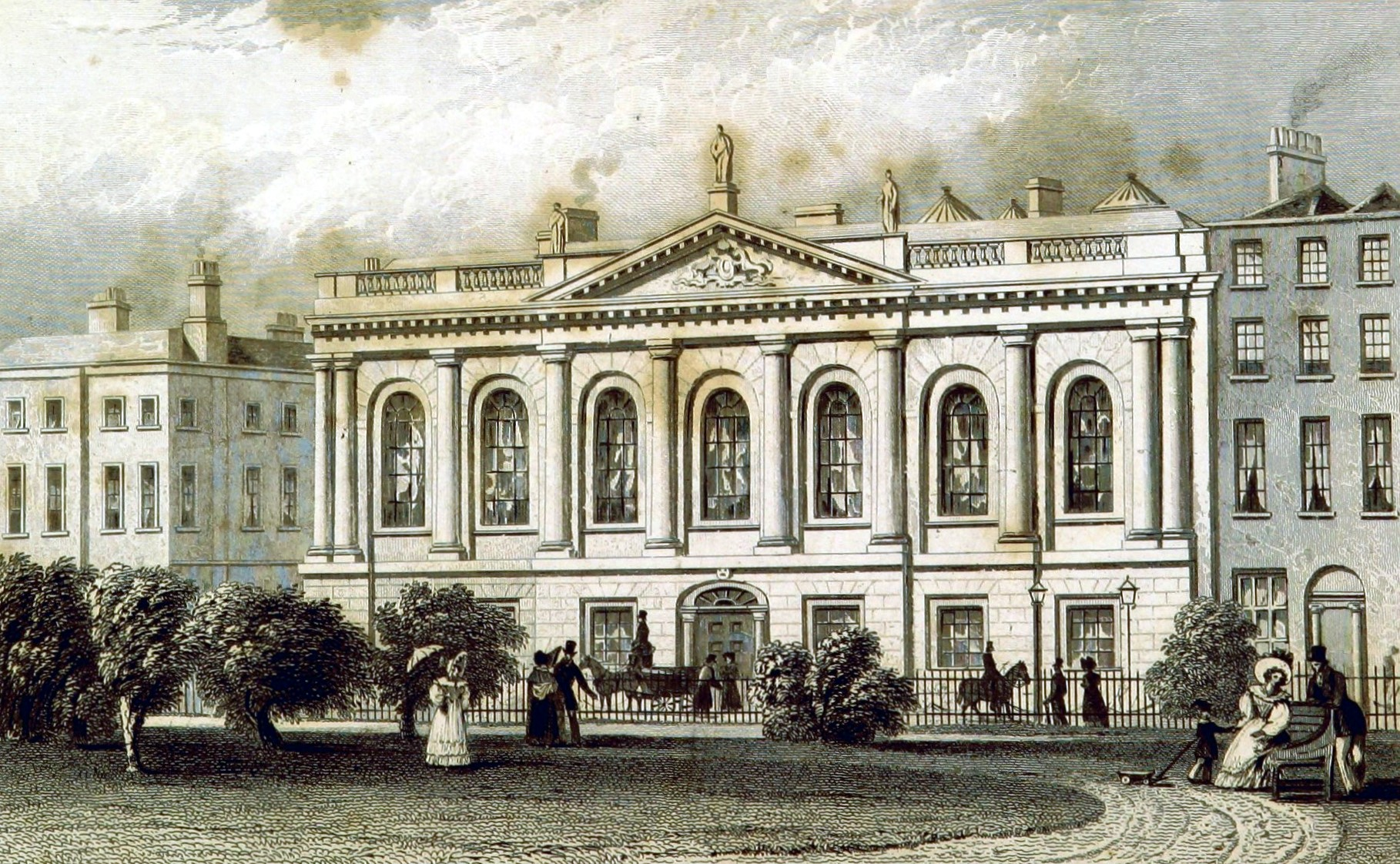
"The College of Surgeons, Dublin". 1837.

Robert Bowes (died 2 April 1803) was the President of the Royal College of Surgeons in Ireland (RCSI) in 1787. He was Surgeon to the Charitable Infirmary, Inns Quay, Dublin, and also Surgeon to Simpson's Hospital. He was a member of the Dublin Society of Surgeons, who petitioned the King in 1781 for the foundation of the Royal College of Surgeons.

== Life ==
Sir Charles A Cameron described Bowes as a member of an aristocratic family, well known in Ireland in the last century, but who later disappeared from it. He commenced practice in Capel Street, Dublin, in 1761. About 1770, he migrated to No. 49 Jervis Street, which at the time was a fashionable medical quarter.

Bowes was one of 49 physicians and chirurgeons who declared their public support for the construction of a Publick Bath in Dublin in May 1771 and named Achmet Borumborad as a well qualified individual for carrying such a scheme into existence.

Bowes was a member of the Dublin Society of Surgeons whose goal was to create a separate organisation focused on providing standardised surgical education. The Society lobbied for a Royal Charter, in 1781 presenting the Lord-Lieutenant a petition to be incorporated separately from barbers. The awaited charter, incorporating the Royal College of Surgeons in Ireland, was granted by King George III on 11 February 1784.

Bowes died a widower and childless. He bequeathed a considerable fortune to his relatives and friends and made a bequest of £360 to the rector and churchwardens of St. Mary's parish for apprentice fees for the children of the parochial school.
