= James Henthorn =

Irish physician (1744–1832)

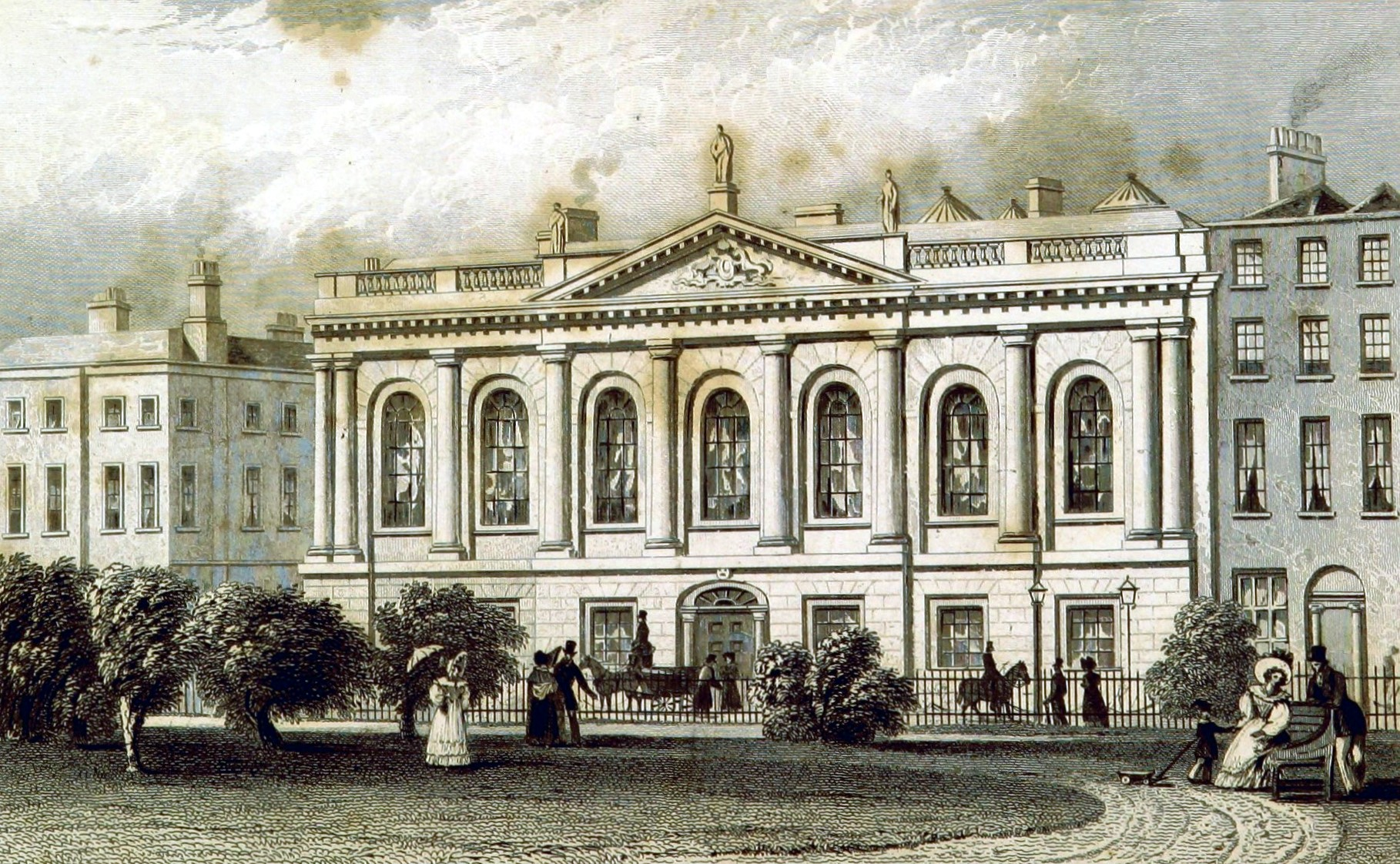
"The College of Surgeons, Dublin". 1837.

James Henthorn (1744 – 28 December 1832) was the president of the Royal College of Surgeons in Ireland (RCSI) in 1822.

James Henthorn was appointed surgeon to the House of Industry Hospitals, on 7 December. He was a member of the Dublin Society of Surgeons and his name is in the first charter granted to the RCSI in 1784. Sir Charles Cameron states: "there is every reason to believe that the real founders of the college were the elder Dease and Henthorn". Henthorn was Surgeon at the Lock Hospital. When he became a Governor of the House of Industry Hospitals, he played the key role in inducing the Government to erect the Richmond, Hardwicke and Fever hospitals.

Henthorn published papers on the treatment of syphilis in the Dublin Hospital Reports for 1808–9. A full-sized portrait of Henthorn, painted by Martin Cregan, is placed in the college meeting-room.

== See also ==
- List of presidents of the Royal College of Surgeons in Ireland
