= Robert Moore Peile =

Irish physician, d. 1858

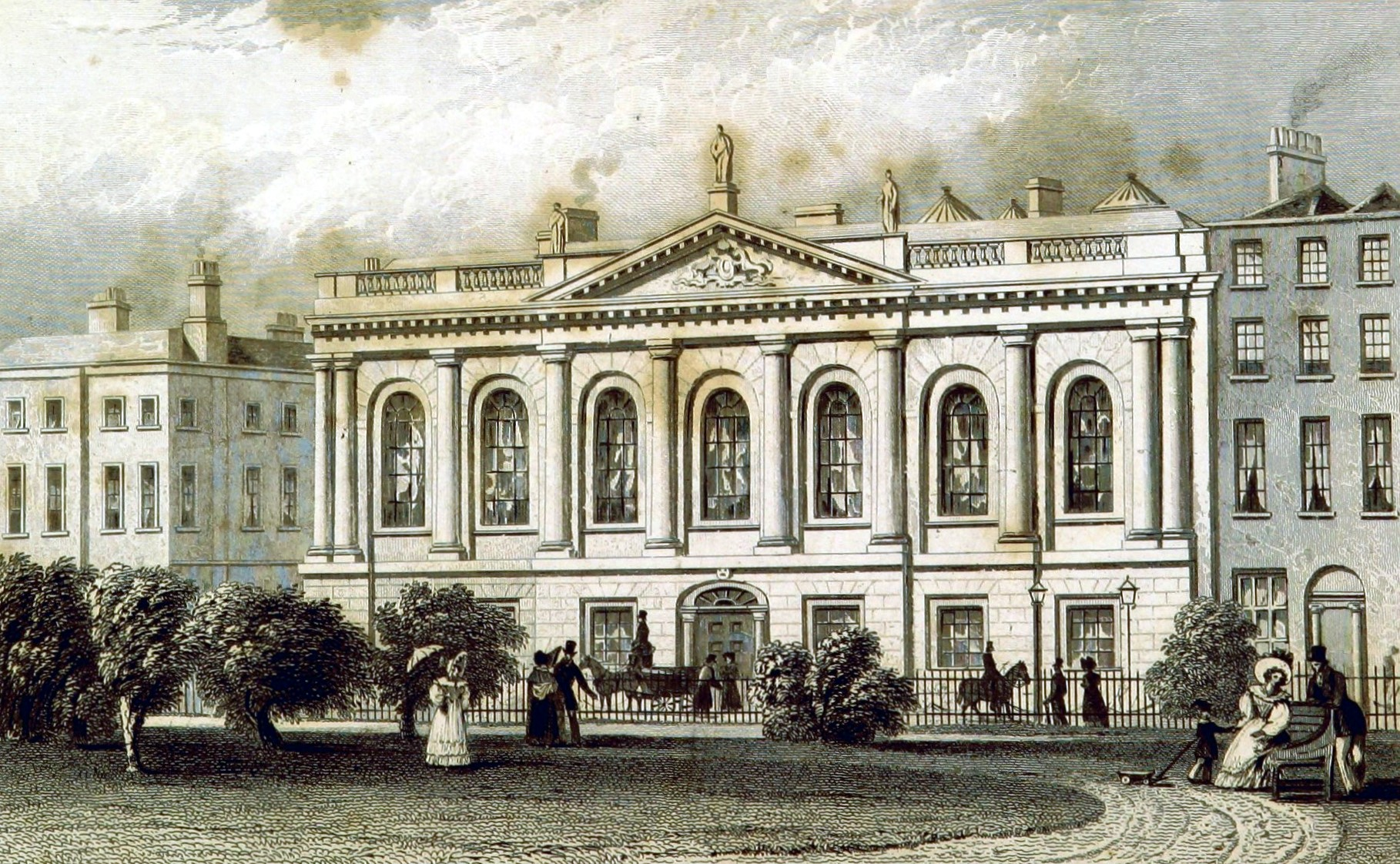
"The College of Surgeons, Dublin". 1837.

Robert Moore Peile (c.1760s - 4 February 1858) was the president of the Royal College of Surgeons in Ireland (RCSI) in 1798 and 1816.

In 1809, Peile graduated M.D. from St. Andrew's University. In 1790, he was appointed as a surgeon to the House of Industry Hospitals and continued in office for more than half a century. He was a consulting surgeon at Steevens' Hospital. In 1795, he was appointed as 'Surgeon to the Hospitals' for the forces serving in Ireland.

In 1803, he was promoted to be a Deputy-Inspector and in 1847 he retired with the rank of Inspector-General. In Ireland, Peile was noted as the inventor of a lithotome, which limited and rendered incisions more facile in lithotomy procedures.

== Contributions and legacy ==
According to Charles Cameron, at one point in time in Ireland, "Peile's lithotome and staff" were to be found in every surgery; and although they are no longer employed, their principles are preserved in the newer forms of the instrument.

Robert Smith stated that out of forty operations for stone, which he knew to have been performed by Peile, only one case had a fatal result. Peile's contributions to surgery and his usage of the lithotome were recognized in medical practice and contributed positively to the future of medical and surgical procedures.
