= Alexander Read (surgeon) =

Irish physician (1786–1850)

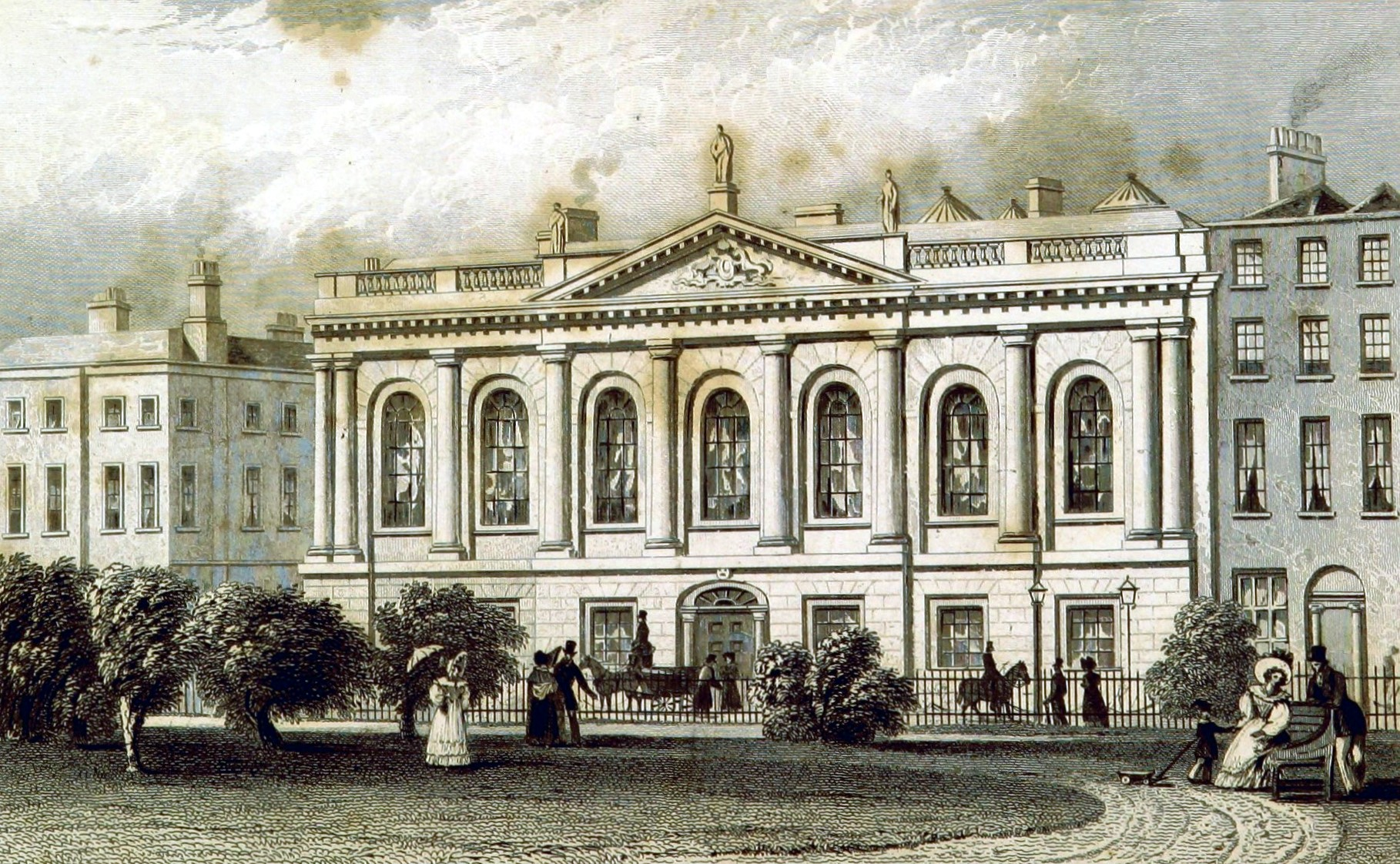
"The College of Surgeons, Dublin". 1837.

Alexander Read (1786 – 18 July 1870) was the president of the Royal College of Surgeons in Ireland (RCSI) in 1825 and 1835.

Alexander Read was born in Downpatrick and received an MA from Trinity College Dublin in 1827. Read was indentured as a surgeon to Sir Henry Jebb and he was subsequently elected a Member of RCSI in 1810. Read was Surgeon to Mercer's, the Blue Coat, and Simpson's Hospitals, and to Dublin's prisons. According to Cameron in his History of RCSI, Alexander Read was esteemed a skilful surgeon, and he had a large purely medical practice. He had a taste for scientific studies, and for a while lectured on medical jurisprudence at the Park-street School of Medicine, and he was subsequently connected with the Richmond Hospital School.

== See also ==
- List of presidents of the Royal College of Surgeons in Ireland
