= Robert Hamilton (surgeon) =

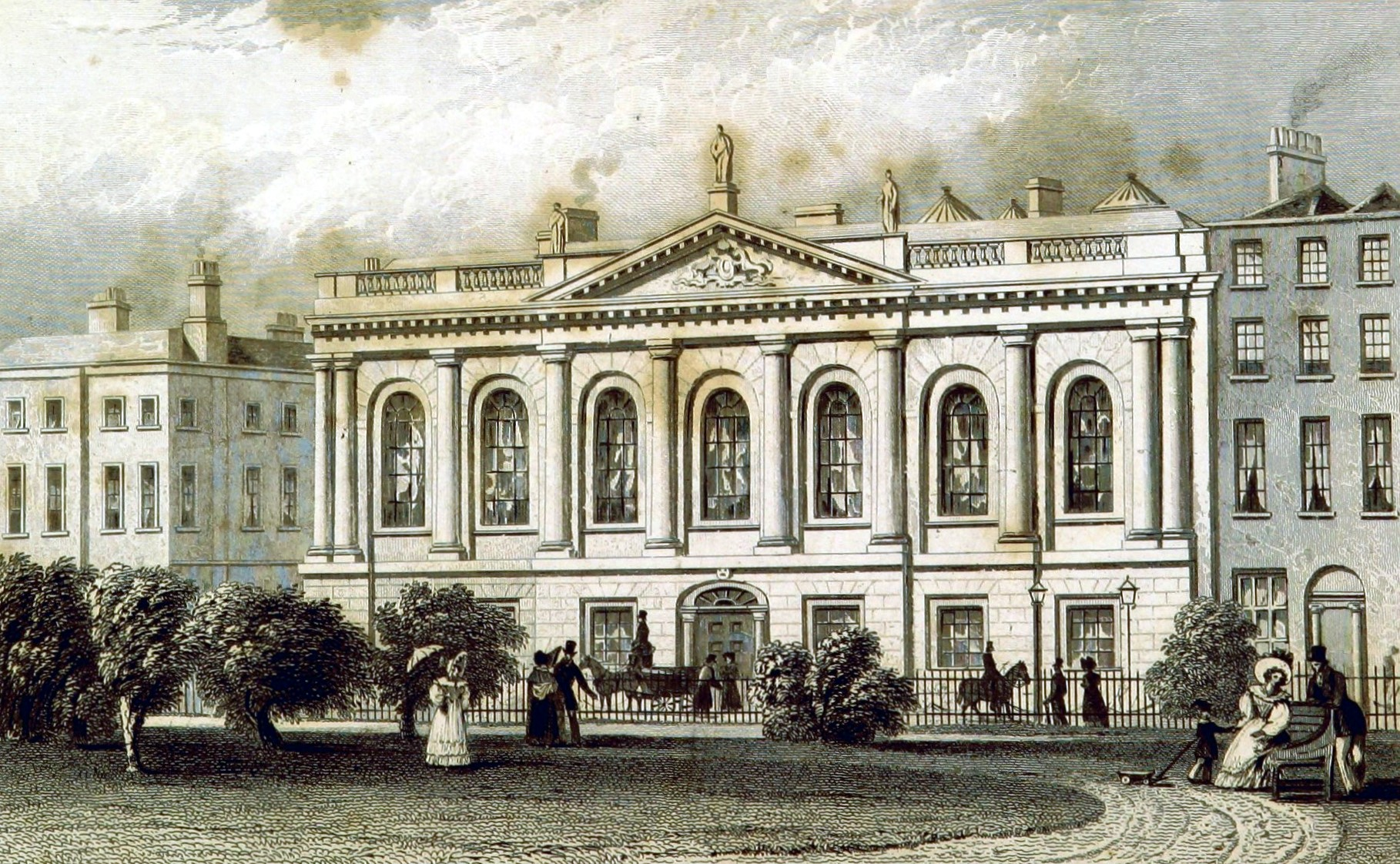
"The College of Surgeons, Dublin". 1837.

Robert Hamilton (died c. 1832) was the president of the Royal College of Surgeons in Ireland (RCSI) in 1805.

Little is known of Robert Hamilton, and Cameron's entry in his History of RCSI is brief. Robert Hamilton was admitted as a licentiate of the Royal College of Surgeons in Ireland on 9 February 1791; and on 22 November of the same year was elected a member. In 1796 he was a staff surgeon on the Dublin Irish Army Establishment, but he did not remain long in the service. He was for many years one of the surgeons of St. Mark's Hospital. He appears to have had a mania for changing his residence. His name disappears from the college list in 1832; he, therefore, probably died in that year.

== See also ==
- List of presidents of the Royal College of Surgeons in Ireland
