= Francis M'Evoy =

Irish physician (1751 – after 1807)

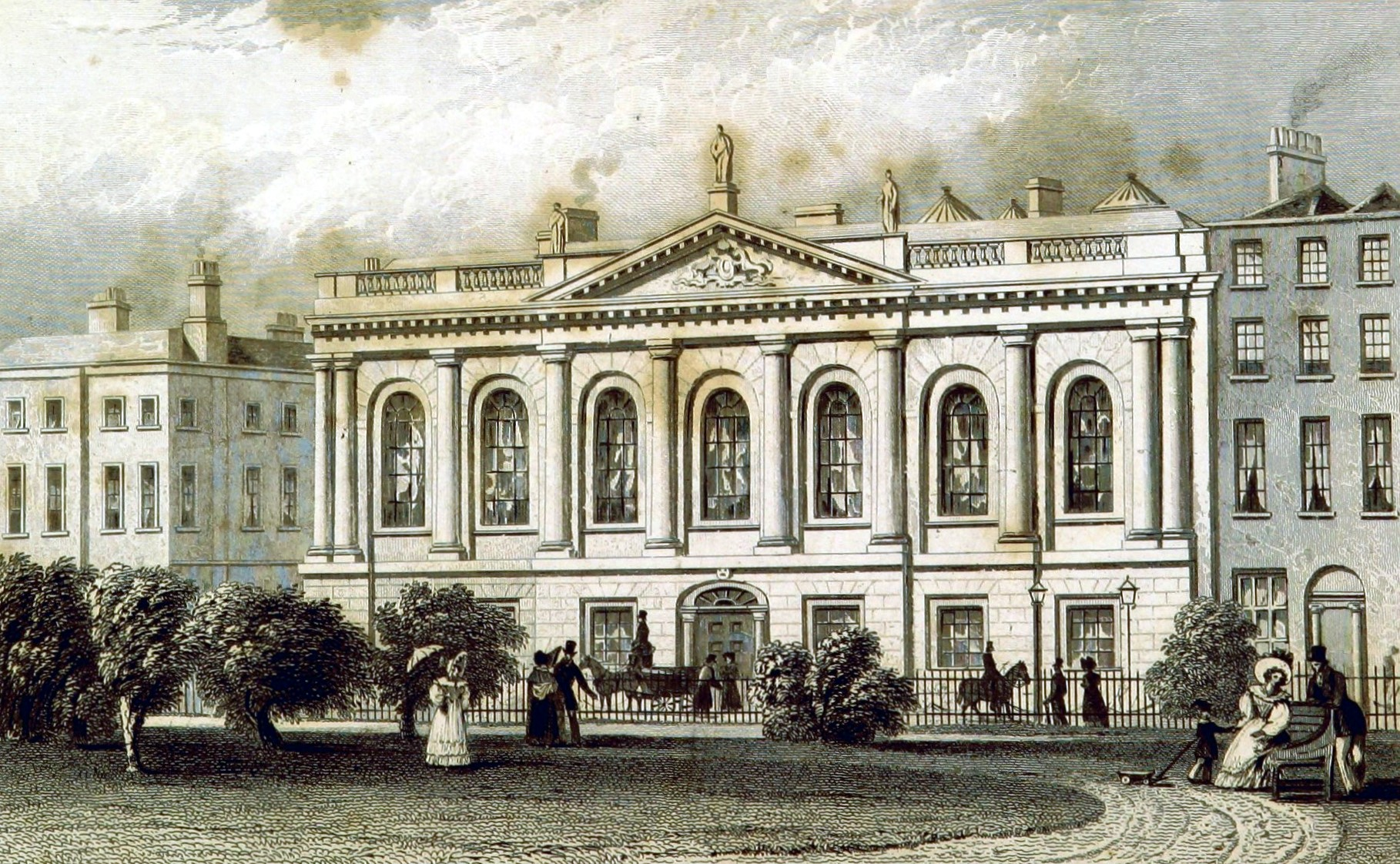
"The College of Surgeons, Dublin". 1837.

Francis M'Evoy (17 July 1751 – after 1807) was the president of the Royal College of Surgeons in Ireland (RCSI) in 1791, 1804, and 1807.

== Early life ==
Francis M'Evoy was born in Dring, north-west of Granard in the County of Longford, on 17 July 1751. His father, Edward M'Evoy, was a gentleman farmer, whose ancestors had lost their property in the times when Roman Catholics found it difficult to maintain their position as landed proprietors. It is believed that their property was given in trust to Lord Sunderland, but it never again came into the possession of the M'Evoys. Edward M'Evoy married Anne Darcy, of Corbetstown. M'Evoy received his primary education at a small school near Corbetstown, and his professional training partly in Dublin, but chiefly at the University of Edinburgh.

== Career ==
M'Evoy settled in Dublin, and in the year 1775 was appointed surgeon to the Charitable Infirmary, Inns Quay. Owing solely to his abilities, he soon acquired a very large practice, and realised a large fortune, with which he purchased landed property in the counties of Longford and Westmeath. He married Anne Fetherston-Haugh, of Bracklyn Castle, Co. Westmeath.

The principal appointments held by M'Evoy were the surgeoncies of the Charitable Infirmary and the Lock Hospital. He was mainly instrumental in having the former removed from Inns Quay to Jervis Street. A marble bust of M'Evoy was placed in that institution as a memorial of his services to it.

M'Evoy was very liberal to his patients when they came from Longford, and he made it a point never to accept a fee from a clergyman of any denomination. According to the author of the Metropolis he was a choleric man. As to his great professional skill, even his rivals never questioned it.

His florid face and strict discipline led a pupil of the Lock Hospital to play a practical joke upon him. Being an artist he executed a highly-coloured picture of M'Evoy in his own prescription-book, of which he managed to gain possession. When M'Evoy opened this book in the presence of the class, he saw in it his portrait, with the words Fieri Facias in large letters written beneath it.

== Death ==
M'Evoy lived for many years at 9 North Earl Street, and subsequently in Abbey Street, where he died. His grief at the untimely death of his only son Edward – a student in Trinity College – is believed to have hastened his end. He, his wife, and his son, are interred in the old churchyard at Killough, County Westmeath.
