= John Armstrong Garnett =

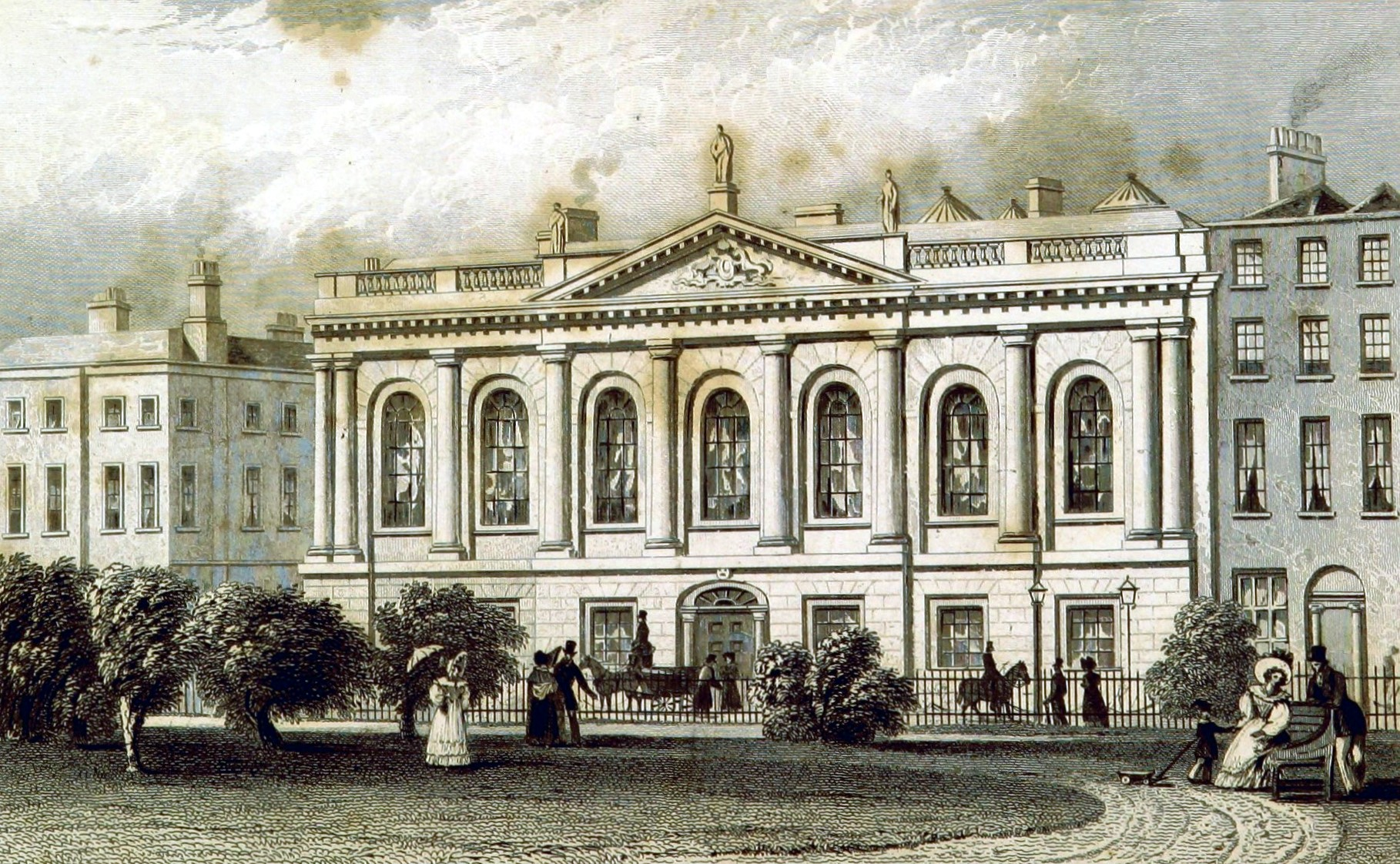
"The College of Surgeons, Dublin". 1837.

John Armstrong Garnett (24 June 1767 – 16 January 1831) was the president of the Royal College of Surgeons in Ireland (RCSI) in 1810.

J. A. Garnett was born at Thurles on 24 June 1767. He was educated at the Tipperary Grammar School, of which his father had been master from 1735. He studied in the College School, and attended Dr. Percival's chemical lectures in Trinity College. He obtained the Letters Testimonial of RCSI on 23 February 1798. On 4 August 1800, he was elected a member, and shortly after was appointed surgeon to Swift's Hospital, and to the General Dispensary, 28 Temple-bar. At this time he resided in Kildare-street, had a good surgical practice, and was an expert chemist, as I gather from the contents of his note-book of experiments. On 6 September 1803, he was elected Professor of Surgical Pharmacy. In 1811 he was obliged to leave Ireland on account of delicate health. He was, when the annual election of professors arrived, re-elected—not at his own request, but on that of C. H. Todd, who proposed to act as his locum tenens in the event of his illness continuing. Next year he was assisted by Andrew Johnston, but he was obliged to resign his professorship in 1813. For eighteen years he continued to be an invalid. His death took place at Sandymount, in the County of Dublin, on 16 January 1831, from paralysis. He was interred in St. Anne's church.

In his History of the RCSI, Cameron gives a direct extract from Garnett's diary detailed his final days with Lord Edward Fitzgerald in Newgate Prison Dublin. Fitzgerald, a leading Irish aristocrat, MP for County Kildare, was military director of the United Irishmen in the nationalist Rebellion of 1798. Fitzgerald had been captured and was due for execution; he died in prison from his wounds, attended by Garnett.

== See also ==
- List of presidents of the Royal College of Surgeons in Ireland
- Lord Edward FitzGerald whom Garnett attended.
