= Thomas Hewson =

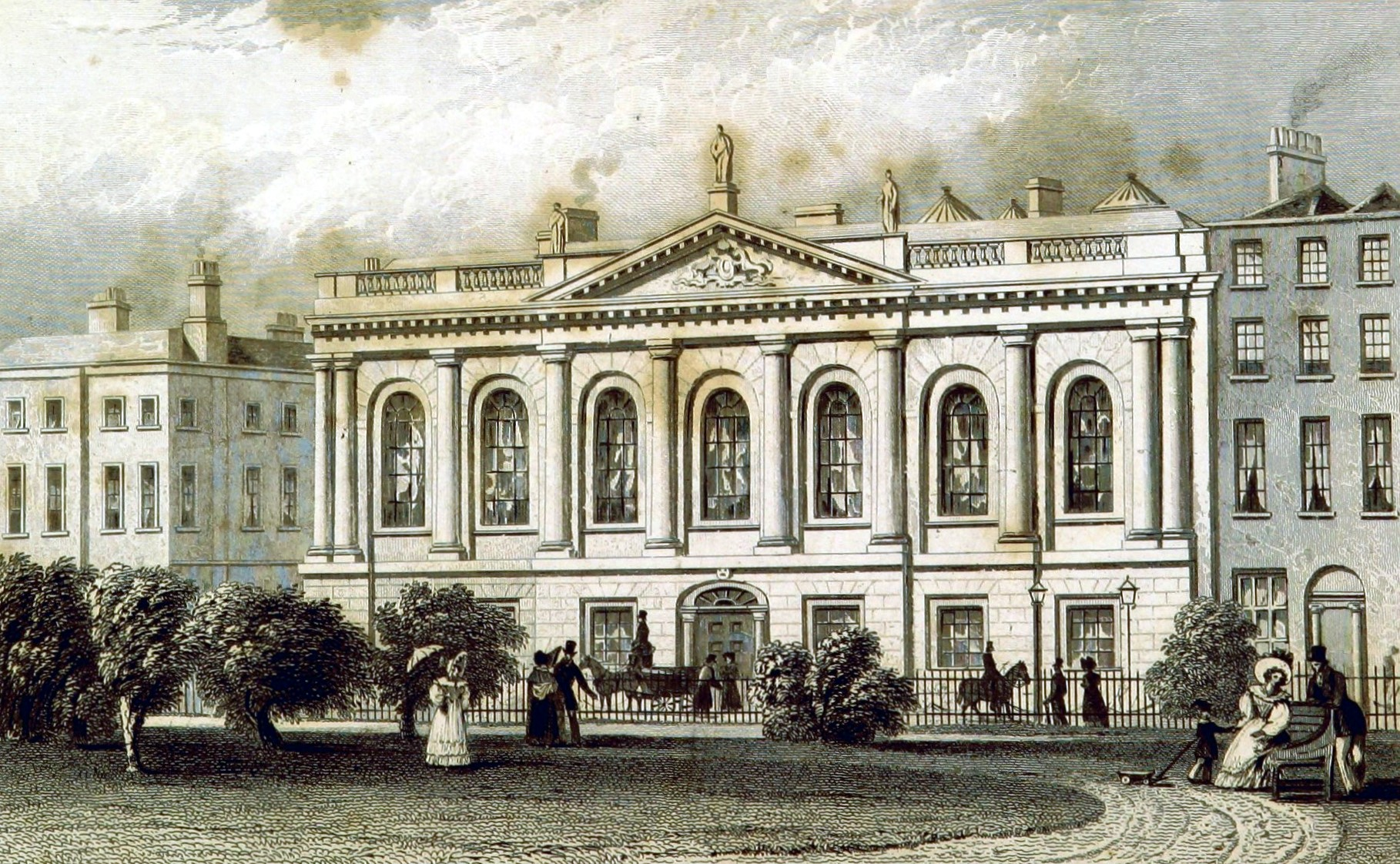
"The College of Surgeons, Dublin". 1837.

Thomas Hewson (27 September 1783 – 1831) was the president of the Royal College of Surgeons in Ireland (RCSI) in 1819.

Hewson was educated in Trinity College, and graduated B.A. in 1803. On 1 May 1800, he was indentured for five years to S. Richards, and received his professional education in the Royal College of Surgeons in Ireland school and the Meath Hospital. On 1 November 1805, he passed his examination at the college, but he was not elected a member until 27 November 1810. On 7 January 1811, he was elected a member of the Court of Assistants, and in 1819 succeeded A.Johnston as Professor of Surgical Pharmacy. In 1809 Hewson succeeded Bingham Wilson as surgeon to the Meath Hospital, and about this time he began to acquire a good practice. According to Cameron, Hewson was much esteemed as a skilful surgeon and an agreeable companion.

== See also ==
- List of presidents of the Royal College of Surgeons in Ireland
