= James Rivers (surgeon) =

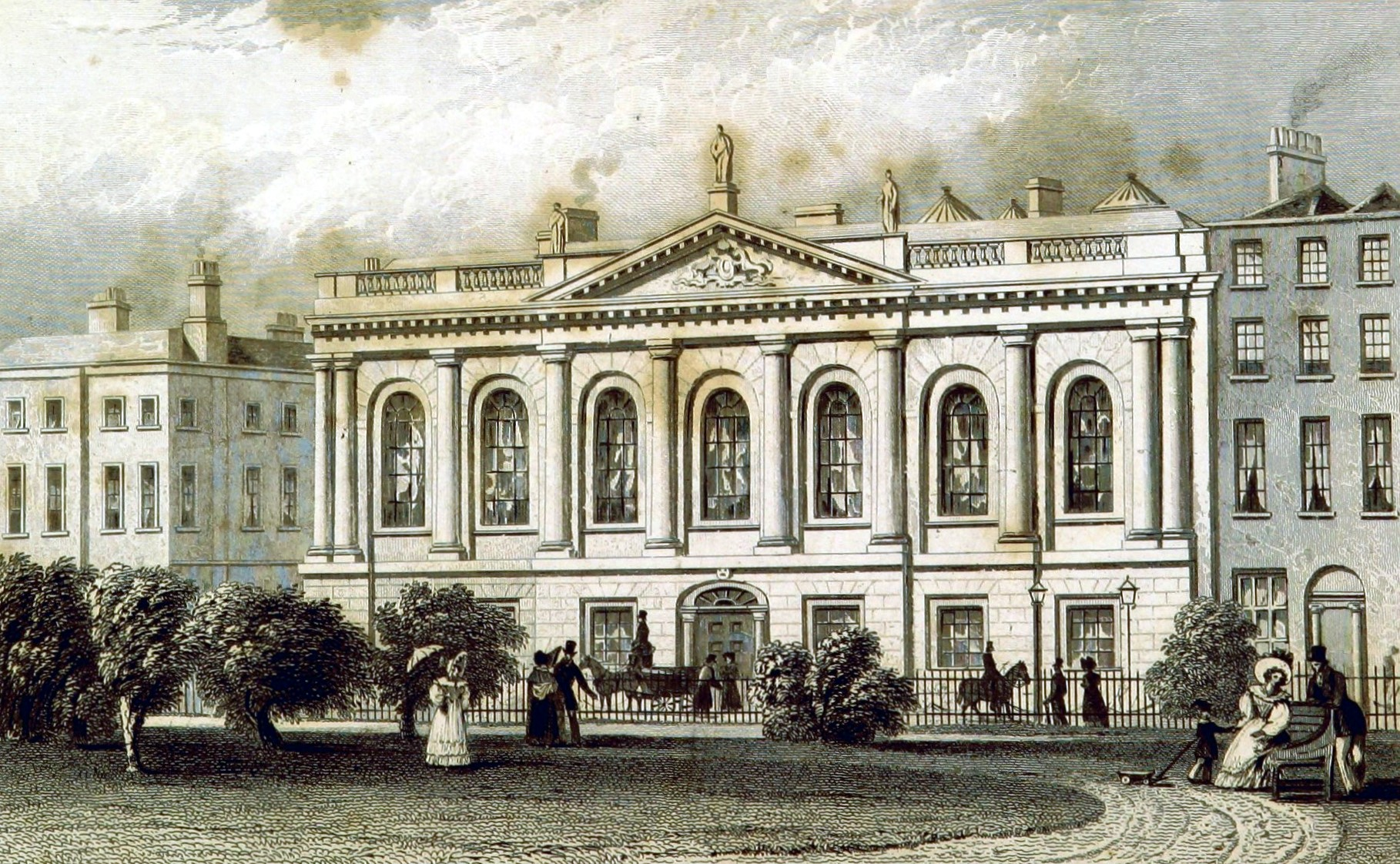
"The College of Surgeons, Dublin". 1837.

James Rivers (died September 1816) was the president of the Royal College of Surgeons in Ireland (RCSI) in 1801.

Charles Cameron in his history of RCSI records that information about James Rivers is scant, other than that he was surgeon to Maynooth College and to St. Mark's Hospital and to the United Hospital of St. Nicholas and St. Catherine. In 1800 he was appointed surgeon to the House of Industry Hospitals.
