= Henry Jebb =

Irish surgeon and midwife (died 1811)

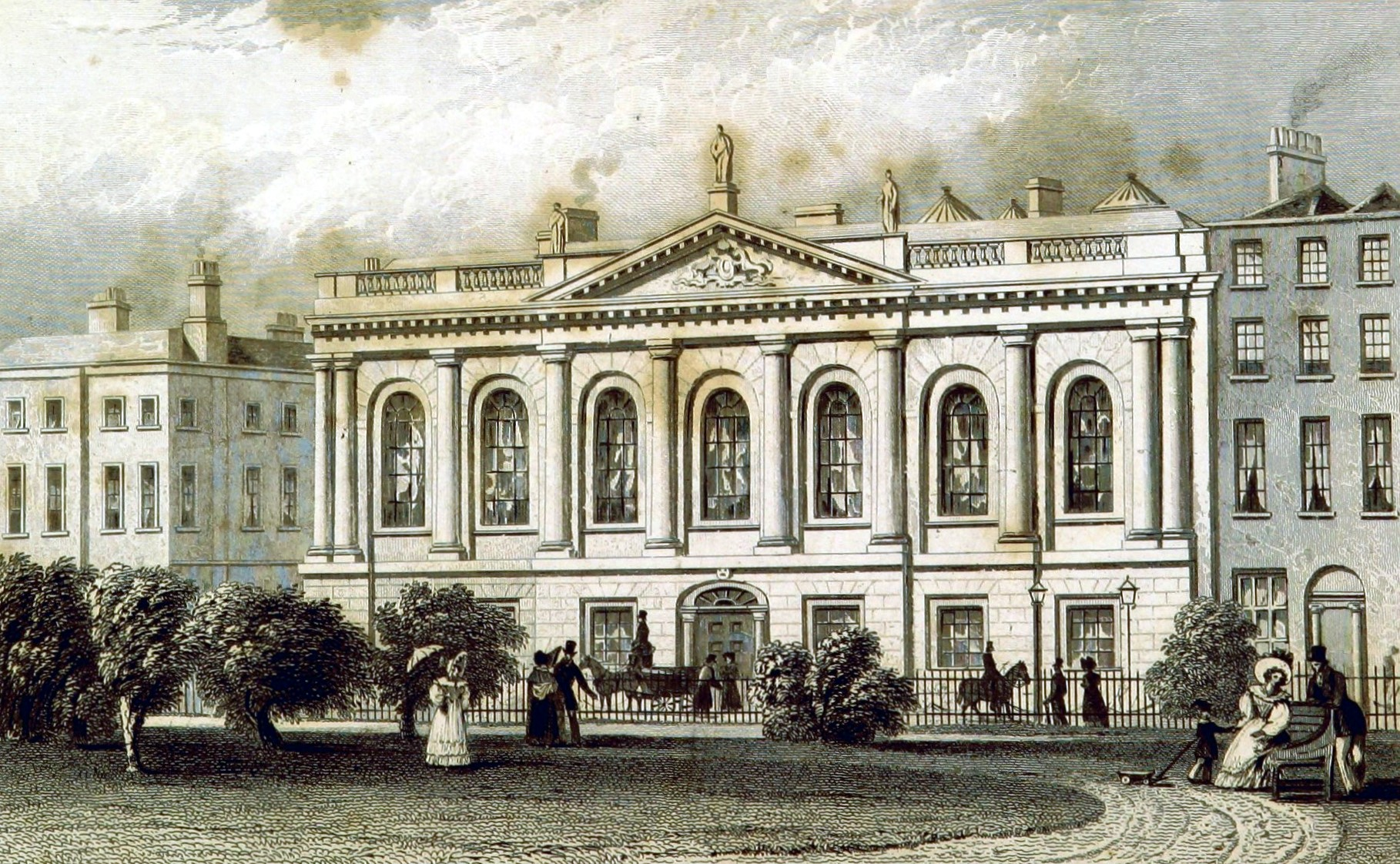
The College of Surgeons, Dublin, 1837

Sir Henry Jebb (died 1811) was an Irish surgeon and midwife, who served as the president of the Royal College of Surgeons in Ireland in 1800.

== Career ==
Henry Jebb set up practice as a surgeon and man-midwife in 1777 in Dublin. For services of an obstetric nature, rendered in Dublin Castle, he received in 1782 the honour of knighthood from the Lord Lieutenant. Jebb was one of the original members of the Dublin Surgeons' Society, and was elected a member of the Royal College of Surgeons in Ireland at their first meeting. For many years he was a surgeon to Mercer's Hospital. He died in 1811, at Dromartin House, which he had built, near Dundrum, County of Dublin, and was buried in the little churchyard at Glasnevin Village, County of Dublin.
