= Abraham Colles =

Irish doctor, academic, President of the RSCI

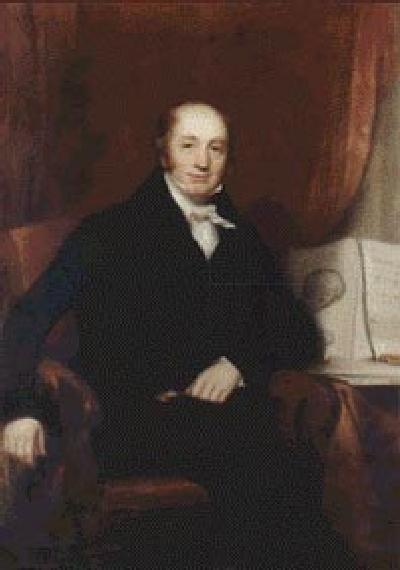
- Born: 23 July 1773; Kilkenny, Kingdom of Ireland
- Died: 16 November 1843 (aged 70); Dublin, Ireland, UK
- Burial place: Dublin, Mount Jerome Cemetery
- Education: Kilkenny College; Trinity College Dublin; Royal College of Surgeons in Ireland (LRCPI); University of Edinburgh (MB ChB)
- Known for: Treatise on surgical anatomy Paper On the Fracture of the Carpal Extremity of the Radius (Colles' fracture).
- Spouse: Sophia Cope (m. 1807)
- Children: 11
- Relatives: H. C. Colles (paternal grandson)
- Medical career
- Profession: Surgeon, Physician
- Institutions: Dr Steevens' Hospital
- Sub-specialties: Anatomy, Physiology, Surgery

Abraham Colles (23 July 1773 – 16 November 1843) was an Irish surgeon and physician who served as Professor of Anatomy, Surgery and Physiology at the Royal College of Surgeons in Ireland (RCSI) and the President of the RCSI in 1802 and 1830. A prestigious Colles Medal & Travelling Fellowship in Surgery is awarded competitively annually to an Irish surgical trainee embarking on higher specialist training abroad before returning to establish practice in Ireland.

== Life ==
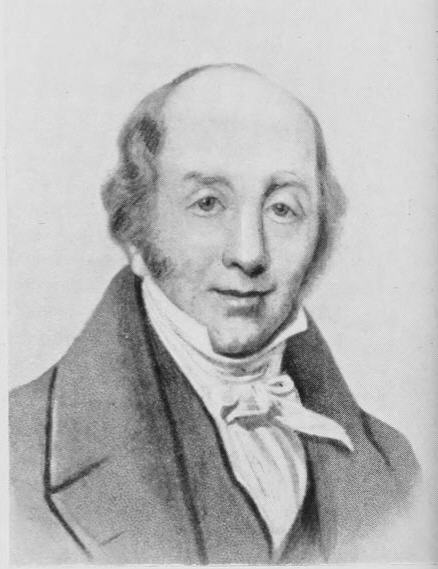

Descended from a Worcestershire family, some of whom had sat in Parliament, he was born to William Colles and Mary Anne Bates of Woodbroak, County Wexford. The family lived near Millmount, a townland near Kilkenny, Ireland, where his father owned and managed his inheritance which was the extensive Black Quarry that produced the famous Black Kilkenny Marble. His father died when Colles was 6, but his mother took over the management of the quarry and managed to give her children a good education. While at Kilkenny College, a flood destroyed a local physician's house. Abraham found an anatomy book belonging to the doctor in a field and returned it to him. Sensing the young man's interest in medicine, the physician let Abraham keep the book.

He went on to enroll in Trinity College Dublin, in 1790 and was indentured to Philip Woodroffe, studying at Dr Steevens' Hospital, The Foundlings' Hospital and the House of Industry Hospitals. He received the Licentiate Diploma of the Royal College of Surgeons in 1795. Colles went on to study medicine at Edinburgh Medical School, receiving his MD degree in 1797. Afterwards, he lived in London for a short period, working with the famous surgeon Sir Astley Cooper in his dissections of the inguinal region.

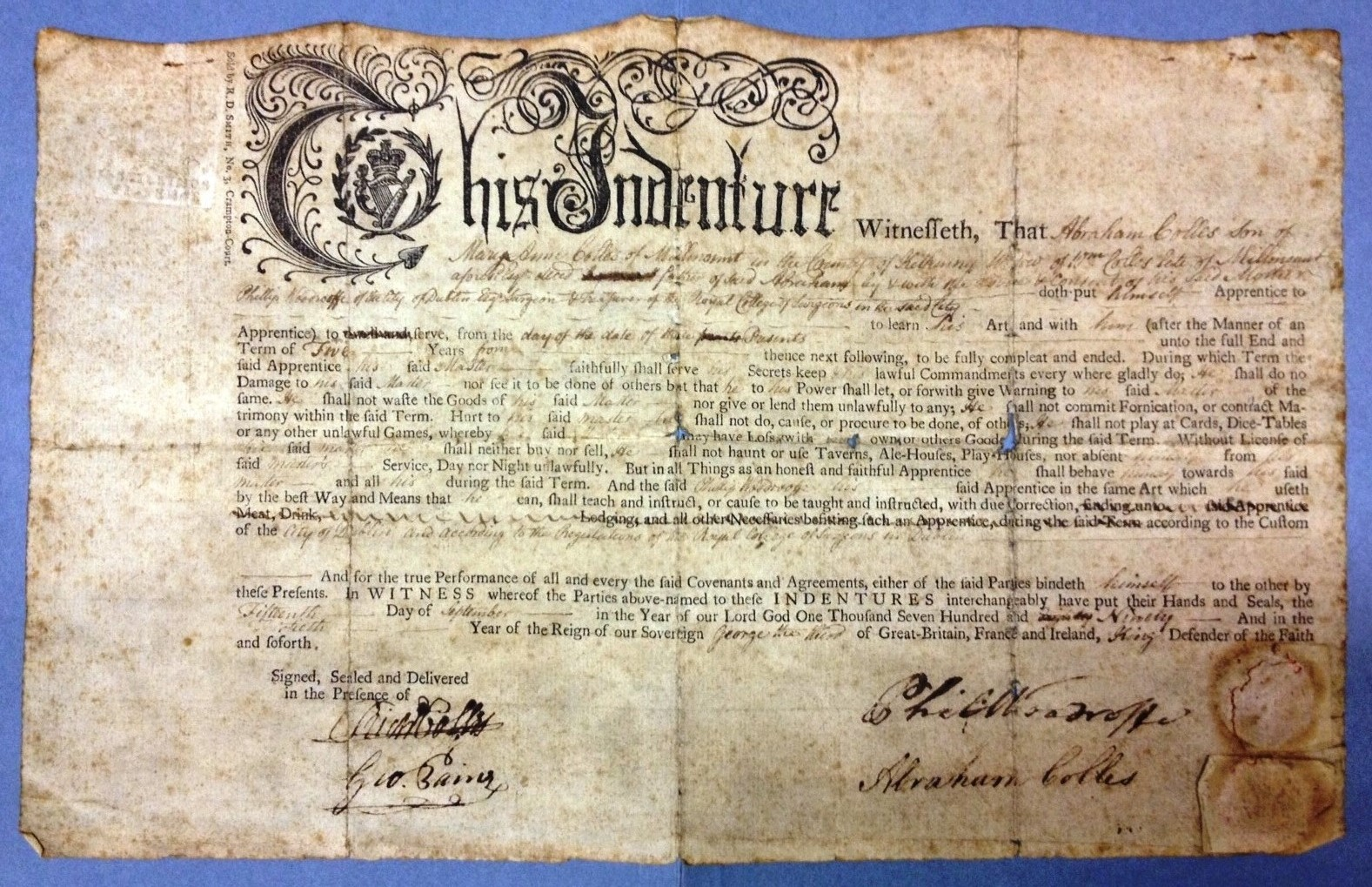
Abraham Colles' indenture to Phillip Woodroffe, 1790

Following his return to Dublin, in 1799, he was elected to the staff at Dr Steevens' Hospital where he served for the next 42 years. In October 1803, Colles was appointed Surgeon to Cork-street Fever Hospital, and subsequently became Consulting Surgeon to the Rotunda, City of Dublin, and Victoria Lying-in Hospitals. He was a well-regarded surgeon and was elected as president of the Royal College of Surgeons in Ireland (RCSI) in 1802 at the age of 28 years, subsequently also serving as president in 1830. In 1804, he was appointed Professor of Anatomy, Physiology, and Surgery at RCSI.

In 1811, he wrote an important treatise on surgical anatomy and some terms he introduced have survived in surgical nomenclature until today. He is remembered as a skilful surgeon and for his 1814 paper On the Fracture of the Carpal Extremity of the Radius; this injury continues to be known as Colles' fracture. This paper, describing distal radial fractures, was far ahead of its time, being published decades before X-rays came into use. He also described the membranous layer of subcutaneous tissue of the perineum, which came to be known as Colles' fascia. He also extensively studied the inguinal ligament, which is sometimes called Colles' ligament. He is regarded as the first surgeon to successfully ligate the subclavian artery.

In 1837, he wrote "Practical observations on the venereal disease, and on the use of mercury" in which he introduced the hypothesis of maternal immunity of a syphilitic infant when the mother had not shown signs of the disease. Colles' principal textbook was the two-volume Lectures on the theory and practice of surgery. Colles's writings are important, though not voluminous. Some of his papers were collected and edited by his son, Mr. William Colles, and published in the Dublin Journal of Medical Science. Selections from the works of Abraham Colles, chiefly relative to the venereal disease and the use of mercury, comprise Volume XCII of the Library of the New Sydenham Society, published in 1881. They are edited and annotated by one of the most distinguished Fellows of the RCSI, Mr. Robert M'Donnell. Colles's Lectures on Surgery were edited by Simon M'Coy, and published in 1850. In tribute to his distinguished career, Professor Colles was offered a baronetcy in 1839, which he refused.

Upon his retirement as Professor of Surgery, the Members of RCSI passed a resolution which included "We have also to assure you that it is the unanimous feeling of the College, that the exemplary and efficient manner in which you have filled this chair for thirty-two years, has been a principal cause of the success and consequent high character of the School of Surgery in this country."

Abraham Colles died on 16 November 1843, from gout. He was buried in Mount Jerome Cemetery, Dublin.

== Family ==
In 1807, he married Miss Sophia Cope, with whom he had six sons and five daughters. His son William followed in his footsteps, being elected to the Chair of Anatomy in the Royal College of Surgeons in Ireland in 1863. Another of his sons Henry married Elizabeth Mayne, a niece of Robert James Graves. His grandson was the eminent music critic and lexicographer H. C. Colles. His granddaughter Frances married the judge Lord Ashbourne; her sister Anna married his colleague Sir Edmund Thomas Bewley.
