= William Dease =

Irish surgeon and anatomist (c. 1752–1798)

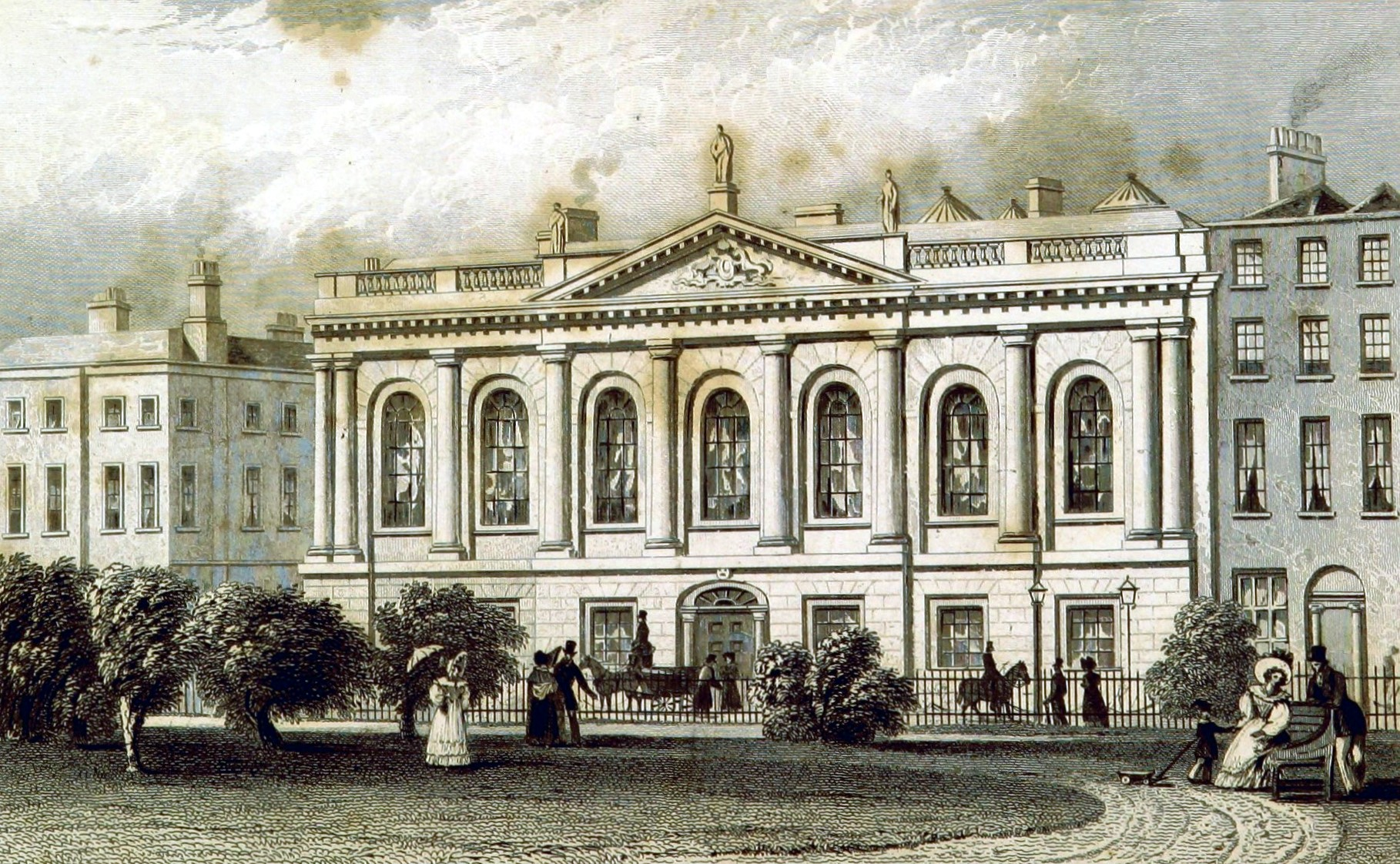
"The College of Surgeons, Dublin". 1837.

William Dease (c. 1752–1798) was an Irish surgeon and anatomist. He was one of the founders of the Royal College of Surgeons in Ireland and its first Professor of Surgery. He studied surgery in Dublin and Paris and was appointed surgeon to the United Hospitals of St Nicholas and St Catherine.

Dease was an original member of the Dublin Society of Surgeons who sought to dissolve the connection that linked surgeons with barbers. The granting of a charter to the Royal College of Surgeons in Ireland in 1784 replaced the original charter of barbers and surgeons, enabling the college to promote and advance surgery in Ireland. According to Cameron in his History of RCSI, Dease contributed liberally towards the expenses incurred in procuring the College Charter. He was the most energetic of the Founders of the college, and was one of the first to lecture in it. His success as a teacher was so great that young men were attracted to him, and enrolled themselves as his apprentices or pupils in great numbers.

Dease published treatises on head injuries, midwifery and the radical cure of hydrocele.

== Life ==
He was born about 1752 in Lisney, County Cavan. He was sent to Dr. Clancy's school in Dublin, and then studied medicine in the city and in Paris. He set up in practice in Dublin, and gained repute as a surgeon, holding hospital appointments. He took an active part in procuring a charter of incorporation for the Dublin surgeons, and became the first professor of surgery in the Royal College of Surgeons in Ireland (RCSI) in 1785, and President of RCSI in 1789.

Dease had a good practice, and married Eliza, daughter of Sir Richard Dowdall. His death was in June 1798, under circumstances are unclear. According to one account he had made the mistake of opening an aneurysm in a patient with a fatal result, taking it for an abscess, went to his study and opened his own femoral artery; according to another account, he died from an accidental wound of the femoral artery; and by a third account, from the rupture of an aneurysm.

In 1812 the Royal College of Surgeons in Ireland procured his bust and placed it in the inner hall; in 1886 a statue of him, presented by his grandson, was placed in the principal hall of the college.

== Selected publications ==
Selected works:

- An introduction to the theory and practice of surgery London: Murray, 1780.
- Observations on wounds of the head. Dublin: J. Williams, 1776.
- Observations on the different methods of treating the venereal disease. Dublin: J. Williams, 1779.
- Observations on the different methods made use of for the radical cure of the hydrocele or watryrupture, and on other diseases of the testicle. Dublin: Williams, 1782.
- Observations in midwifery, particularly on the different methods of assisting women in tedious and difficult labours. Dublin: J. Williams, 1783.

== Notes ==
Attribution

This article incorporates text from a publication now in the public domain: "Dease, William". Dictionary of National Biography. London: Smith, Elder & Co. 1885–1900.

- See also William Dease in the Dictionary of Irish Biography.
