= Charles Cameron (physician) =

Irish physician, chemist and writer

Sir Charles Cameron
- Born: Charles Alexander Cameron; 16 July 1830; Dublin, Ireland
- Died: 27 February 1921 (aged 90); Dublin
- Citizenship: British
- Known for: Head of the Public Health Department of Dublin Corporation for over 50 years.
- Scientific career
- Fields: Public health, medical hygiene, chemical analysis
- Workplaces: Dr Steevens' Hospital, Royal College of Surgeons in Ireland, Dublin Corporation

Sir Charles Alexander Cameron, CB (16 July 1830 – 27 February 1921) was an Irish physician, chemist and writer prominent in the adoption of medical hygiene. For over fifty years he had charge of the Public Health Department of Dublin Corporation. He was elected President of the Royal College of Surgeons in Ireland (RCSI) in 1885.

== Early life and education ==
Cameron was born 1830 in Dublin, Ireland, the son of Captain Ewen Cameron of Scotland and Belinda Smith of County Cavan. He was descended from Clan Cameron of Lochiel.

He received his early education in chemistry and pharmaceutical chemistry in Dublin. In 1852 he was elected professor to the newly founded Dublin Chemical Society while continuing to study medicine at several schools and hospitals in Dublin. In 1854 he went to Germany where he graduated in philosophy and medicine. While there he published his translations of German poems and songs.

In 1862, he married Lucie Macnamara of Dublin.

== Medical career ==
Upon his return to Ireland he became scientific advisor to the British government in Ireland in criminal cases and over the years took part in many notable trials, including those relating to the Phoenix Park Murders. In 1862, he became public analyst for the City of Dublin, which position was later extended to 23 counties in Ireland. In 1867, he was elected Professor of Hygiene in the Royal College of Surgeons in Ireland (RCSI). He was also lecturer in chemistry in Dr Steevens' Hospital and the Ledwich School of Medicine, succeeding Dr. Maxwell Simpson, and retained these positions until 1874. In 1875 he was appointed Professor of Chemistry at the Royal College of Surgeons in Ireland.

From 1858 to 1863, he was editor and part proprietor of the Agricultural Review, in which he wrote hundreds of articles on various subjects. In 1860–62, he was also editor of the Dublin Hospital Gazette and afterwards published many reports on public health to the Dublin Journal of Medical Science. At this time he was in contact with many agricultural associations both in Ireland and abroad and received a number of awards and tributes.

In 1874, he became Co-Medical Officer of Health for Dublin Corporation and two years later became Chief Medical Officer. Being in charge of the Public Health Department of Dublin City meant that he was always in the public eye, and due to the level of poverty and disease in the city at the time his work was cut out for him. He made many recommendations for improving the sanitation of dwellings and saw to it that unsanitary housing was either improved or closed down. He published numerous sanitary reports, papers on hygiene, the social life of the very poor and proper eating habits, those of the very poor in particular. On the other hand, he was in a position to meet the major figures of the day, from the monarchy and the government downwards. He was a member of several clubs in the city and dined with local and visiting celebrities alike, which he described in his reminiscences.

In 1884 he became vice-president of the Royal College of Surgeons of Ireland, and the following year became president. He was knighted in 1885 in consideration of "his scientific researches, and his services in the cause of public health". In 1886, he published his History of the Royal College of Surgeons in Ireland, and of the Irish Schools of Medicine. This work contains nearly 300 biographies of the most eminent medical men in Ireland.

== Personal life ==
Cameron married Lucie Macnamara of Dublin in 1862, who died in the early 1880s. They had eight children.

His eldest son, Captain Charles J. Cameron, died in a boating accident in Athlone in 1913, while another son, Lieutenant Ewen Henry Cameron, shot himself in a train in Newcastle in 1915 while on the way to the Western Front. Two sons, Edwin and Mervyn, died of pulmonary tuberculosis in their 20s.

Cameron was a leading Freemason in Dublin, serving as Deputy Grand Master of the Grand Lodge of Ireland (1911–20), Deputy Grand Master of the Great Priory of Ireland, Sovereign Grand Commander of the Supreme Council of the 33rd degree (Ancient and Accepted Rite for Ireland). He was first initiated as a member of Fidelity Lodge No. 125 in 1858, and he was also a member of the Duke of York Lodge No. 25, serving as its secretary for over 50 years.

== Later life ==
In 1911 Cameron was made a Freeman of the city and honoured by many from the Sinn Féin Lord Mayor, Alderman Kelly, to the Lord Lieutenant, Lord Aberdeen.

He died at his home on Raglan Road in Dublin on 27 February 1921 and was interred in Mount Jerome Cemetery. At his death he left a son, Ernest Stuart Cameron, and two daughters, Lucie Gerrard and Helena Stanley.

== Arms ==
Coat of arms of Charles Cameron
Notes Granted 2 March 1911 by Nevile Rodwell Wilkinson, Ulster King of Arms. Crest An arm in armour embowed the hand holding a *irk all Proper charged on the elbow with a trefoil slipped Vert. Torse Of the colours. Escutcheon Gules three bars Or surmounted of a bend Argent charged with the rod of AEsculapius Proper between two trefoils slipped Vert. Motto Pro Rege Et Patria

== Works ==
- Reminiscences of Sir Charles A. Cameron, CB, 1913
- History of the Royal College of Surgeons in Ireland, and of the Irish Schools of Medicine 1886

== See also ==
- Hygiene
