= Carroll & Batchelor =

Architectural firm

Carroll & Batchelor was an architectural partnership in Dublin, Ireland, formed by James Rawson Carroll and Frederick Batchelor around 1892. The firm is best known for its work on many of Dublin's Victorian era hospitals. The partnership lasted until Carroll retired from practice in 1905.

== Background ==
Carroll was born in Dublin in 1830. He was admitted to the Royal Dublin Society's School of Drawing in Architecture in 1846. He subsequently worked as an apprentice under George Fowler Jones and was his assistant from around 1849 to around 1856. Carroll went on to work for John Raphael Rodrigues Brandon before going into independent practice around 1857. Carroll trained George Gilbert Alexander Andrew Irvine.

== Partnership ==
Carroll and Batchelor formed an architectural partnership around 1892.

Other architects trained by Carroll and Batchelor include:

- Frederick George Hicks
- Albert Walter Moore
- John Knox Vinycomb
- William Henry Ward

== Works ==
- Hardwicke Fever Hospital – new isolation hospital (1893)
- Richmond Surgical Hospital – new red brick and terracotta hospital in the English Renaissance style (1899–1901)
- Royal Hospital for Incurables (Royal Hospital Donnybook) – new nurses' home (ca. 1900)
- Royal Victoria Eye and Ear Hospital – new hospital (1902–1906)
- St. Mark's Ophthalmic Hospital – new buildings for outpatients and 120 inpatients with "sanitary annexes"
- St. Edmundsbury Hospital, Lucan – additions, alterations, repairs to roof (1902)
- Whitworth Fever Hospital (Drumcondra Hospital) – addition of outermost blocks (ca. 1900)
