= Westmoreland Lock Hospital =

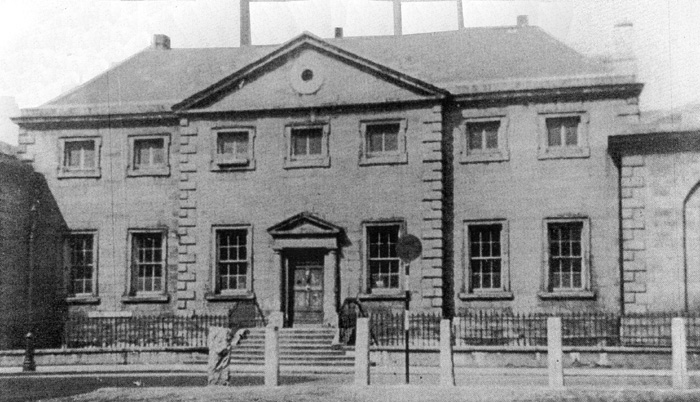
- Westmoreland Lock Hospital in 1890

Geography
- Location: Townsend Street, Dublin, Ireland
- Coordinates: 53.34614°N 6.25439°W Building details
- Alternative names: St Margaret of Cortona (1946 onwards)

General information
- Architectural style: Georgian
- Classification: Demolished
- Estimated completion: 1792 (refurbishment and new wings)
- Demolished: 1956

Technical details
- Material: granite

Design and construction
- Architects: Richard Johnston; Francis Johnston; Edward Parke

Organisation
- Type: Specialist

Services
- Speciality: Venereal disease

History
- Founded: 1755
- Closed: 1949

Links
- Lists: Hospitals in the Republic of Ireland

The Westmoreland Lock Hospital (Irish: Ospidéal Loc Westmoreland) was a hospital for venereal disease originally located at Donnybrook and later moved to Lazar's Hill (now Townsend Street), Dublin, Ireland.

== History ==
Surgeon George Doyle first established a hospital to treat venereal diseases in women and children on Rainsford Street (named for Mark Rainsford) in 1755.

The hospital then relocated on a number of occasions including to South Great George's Street, Clarendon Street and the Buckingham Hospital on Buckingham Street (later to become Temple Street Children's Hospital) as well as finally a fourteen-year spell at Donnybrook, but its distance from the city centre made it unattractive for physicians.

=== Townsend street ===
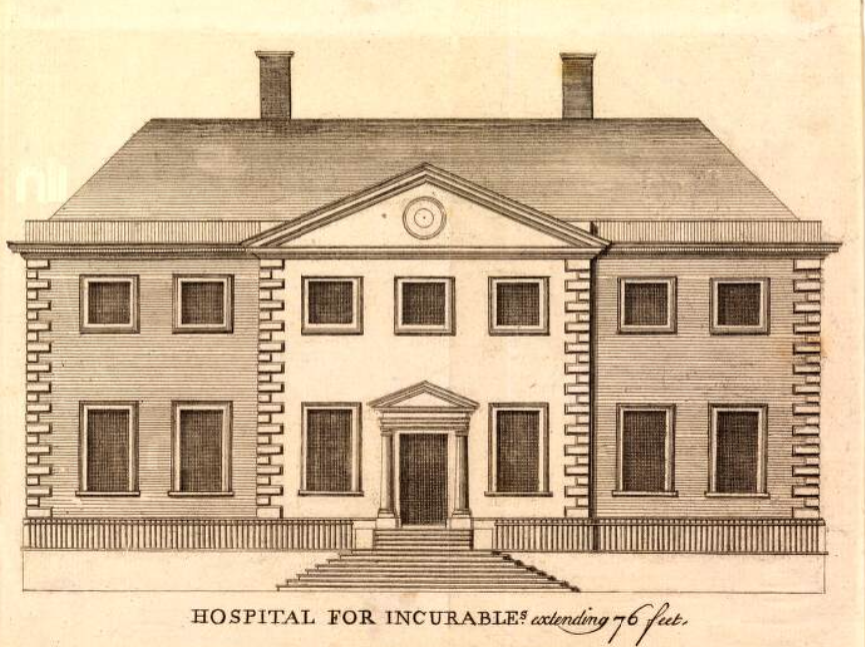
Hospital for incurables (1762)

At the same time the Hospital for Incurables in Townsend Street was running out of space. It was decided to swap locations, which benefited both hospitals. The new hospital, which was located at the corner of present-day Townsend Street and Luke Street, was opened in the old building on 20 November 1792 after a refurbishment and the addition of wings. The part of the name "Westmoreland" refers to the John Fane, 10th Earl of Westmorland who was Lord Lieutenant of Ireland at the time. The 'Lock Hospitals' were developed for the treatment of syphilis following the end of the use of lazar hospitals, as leprosy declined. The part of the name "Lock Hospital" refers back to the earlier leprosy hospitals, which came to be known as lock hospitals after the "locks", or rags, which covered the lepers' lesions. Other hospitals treating lepers in 18th century Dublin included the Lock Hospital in Clarendon Street, and Mercer's Hospital.

Initially, the hospital treated 300 people of both sexes. This was later reduced to 150 beds and from 1820 only women were admitted (males were sent to Dr Steevens' Hospital and the Richmond Surgical Hospital). It was supported by the state from the outset. Catholics and Protestants were segregated. In the 19th century most of the patients were prostitutes, a consequence of the large military presence in the city - Dublin having the "largest garrison of the British army at home or in the colonies" (Under-Secretary Thomas Larcom). It became part of the objectives of the hospital governors to prevent the transmission of venereal disease to troops stationed in the city, and the hospital was provided with a grant from the government to effect this.

In 1794 the Lock penitentiary opened at the Bethesda Chapel on Dorset Street, which catered for women who had been discharged from the hospital. Other destinations for those discharged were the Lying-in hospital (now the Rotunda Hospital), the work-house, or the Cork Street Fever Hospital. The hospital never had the power to hold women against their will.

In 1945 the hospital was given special responsibilities for co-ordinating the treatment of women and infants in Dublin but was given no additional funding to do so. The hospital soon exhausted its savings. Unlike the other Dublin hospitals, it had no voluntary subscribers. It was renamed The Hospital of Saint Margaret of Cortona in 1946 and transferred to Dublin Corporation in 1951. After the building fell into a state of disrepair it closed in 1956 and was subsequently demolished with the doorcase salvaged by antiquarian John Hunt for his home in Howth.

Its foundations were excavated in 1998 and the site was subsequently redeveloped as the Countess Markievicz Leisure Centre.

The Royal College of Physicians of Ireland holds a comprehensive collection of minutes, patient registers, reports and accounts of the Hospital from its foundation up to the end of the 19th century.

== Notable physicians ==
Notable physicians included:

- Winslow Seymour Sterling Berry, former Dept. of Local Government and Public Health, deputy medical officer served as registrar.
- Sir Philip Crampton, appointed assistant-surgeon c.1804
- Richard Carmichael, appointed a surgeon in 1810
- James Wilson Hughes, elected registrar of the hospital (out of a total of 100 applicants) in 1871. He was well known in Dublin for having saved the lives of seven women at a fire in the Kildare Street Club in November 1860.
- George Pugin Meldon, appointed a surgeon in 1904
- Percy Kirkpatrick, appointed a surgeon in c.1910

== Ballads ==
A number of broadside ballads were printed in Britain and Ireland in the 19th century referring to a Lock Hospital or a similar institution, and the downfall of a young man or soldier (and later, woman). According to Bishop and Roud (2014), the earliest-known variant, a late eighteenth-century/early nineteenth-century broadside in the Madden Collection, is called "The Buck's Elegy". The song is set in Covent Garden, England.

Another early mention of a hospital is on early 19th broadsides. A song was called My Jewel, My Joy in Ireland and was collected in Cork in the 1790s. A single-verse fragment of this song was noted, along with the tune. In 1911, Phillips Barry, who had studied folklore at Harvard, published an article claiming that the origins of "The Unfortunate Lad" were to be found in the fragment called "My Jewel, My Joy". (There is a Folkways record - "The Unfortunate Rake", FS 3805 - dedicated exclusively to The Unfortunate Rake family of songs). In America, the song has been adapted to the cattle range (The Cowboy's Lament or The Streets of Laredo) and the gambling hall (St. James' Infirmary). Christy Moore recorded a song named Locke Hospital on the album "Prosperous" (1972).
