= Royal Victoria Eye and Ear Hospital =

- Health Service Executive
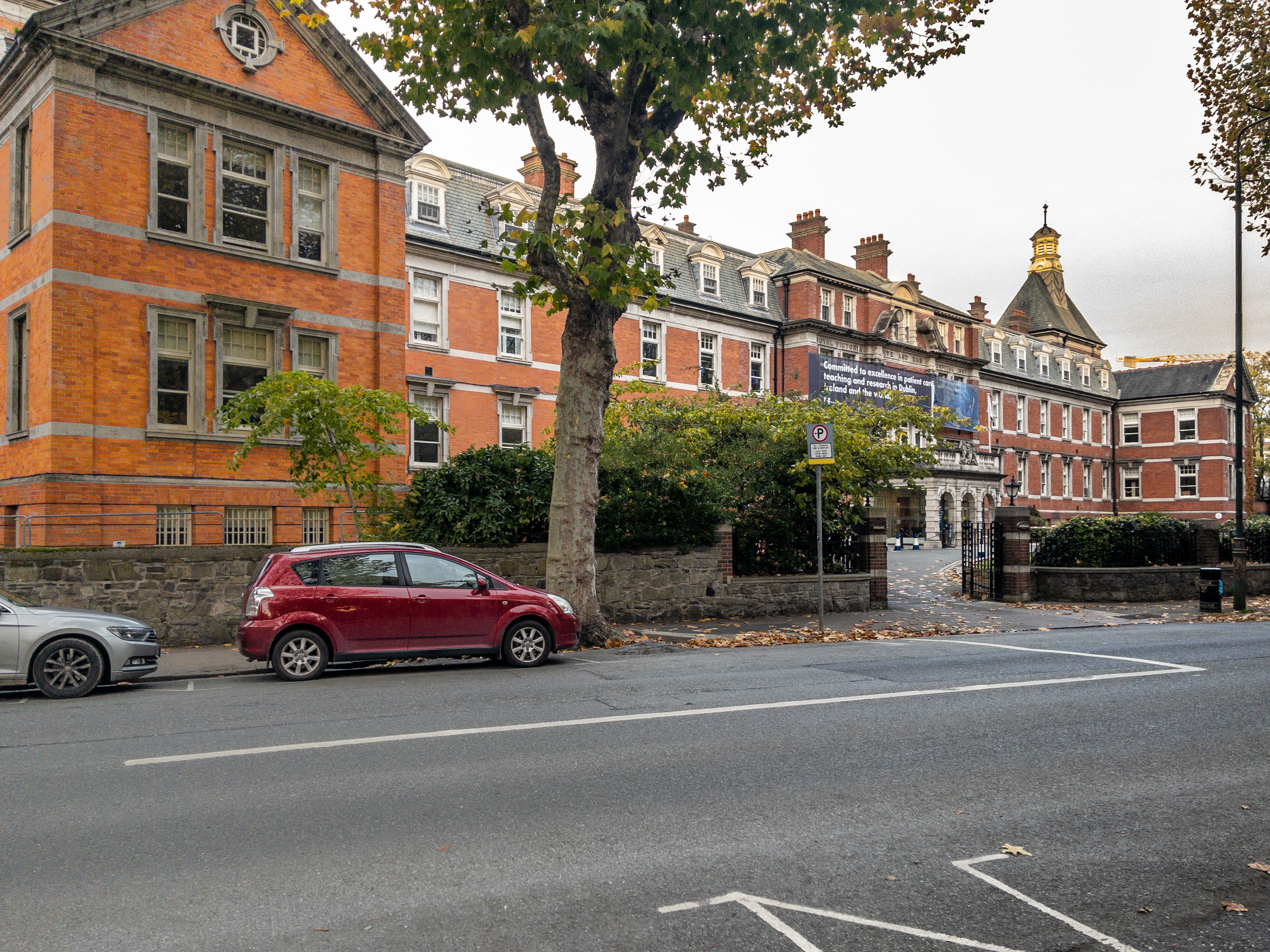
- Royal Victoria Eye and Ear Hospital, Adelaide Road, Dublin D02

- Shown in Dublin

Geography
- Location: Adelaide Road, Dublin, Ireland
- Coordinates: 53.332762°N 6.256049°W

Organisation
- Care system: HSE
- Type: Specialist
- Affiliated university: Royal College of Surgeons in Ireland; Trinity College Dublin

Services
- Emergency department: Yes Accident & Emergency
- Beds: 80
- Speciality: Ophthalmology, Otorhinolaryngology

History
- Founded: 1895

Links
- Website: www.rveeh.ie
- Lists: Hospitals in the Republic of Ireland

The Royal Victoria Eye and Ear Hospital (also known as The Eye and Ear) (Irish: Ospidéal Ríoga Victoria Súl agus Cluas) is a public teaching hospital in Dublin, Ireland. The Royal Victoria Eye and Ear Hospital in Dublin was founded in 1895 and is the National Referral Centre for both Eye and Ear, Nose & Throat disorders.

== History ==
The hospital was established by amalgamating the National Eye Hospital (founded in 1814 by Isaac Ryall) and St. Mark's Ophthalmic Hospital for Diseases of the Eye and Ear on Lincoln Place (founded by Sir William Wilde in 1844) in 1895. The campaign to do this was spearheaded by ophthalmologist Sir Henry Rosborough Swanzy.

Along with the authorisation to merge the hospitals, the Dublin Eye and Ear Hospital Act 1895 provided for expansion of the facilities. A site was purchased on Adelaide Road in 1899 and, once new facilities had been constructed, all patients were transferred from the National Eye Hospital and St. Mark's Hospital on 18 February 1904.

Dr. Kathleen Lynn was the first female doctor to work at the hospital when she was appointed in 1910. Lynn went on to establish Saint Ultan's Children's Hospital and became an activist and politician noted for her involvement in the 1916 Easter Rising.

== Design and construction ==
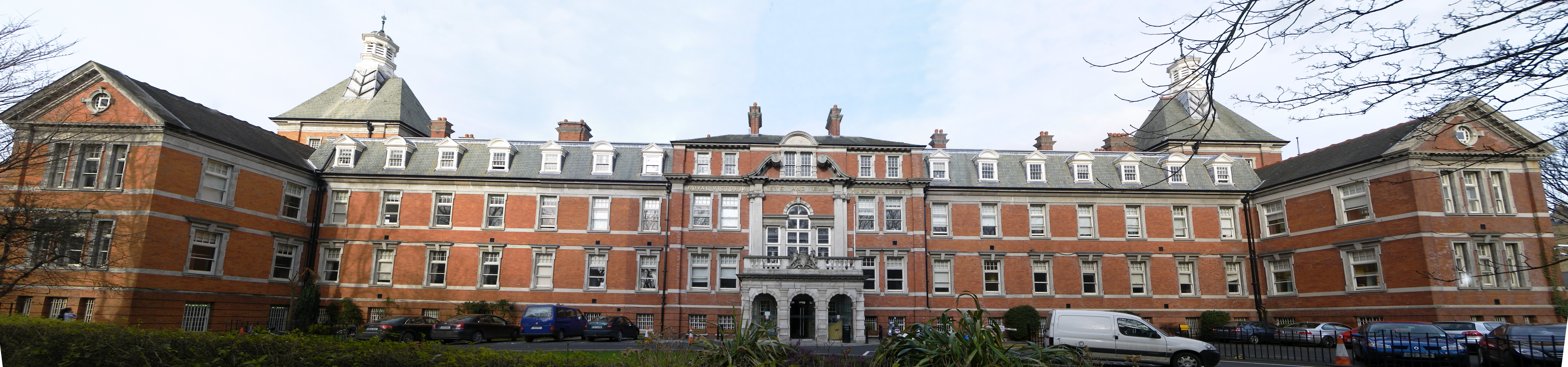
View from Adelaide Road

The hospital was designed by architects Carroll & Batchelor who had previously worked on the Hardwicke Fever Hospital, the Richmond Surgical Hospital, St. Mark's Ophthalmic Hospital, St. Edmundsbury Hospital, Lucan, Whitworth Fever Hospital (Drumcondra Hospital), and the Royal Hospital for Incurables (Royal Hospital, Donnybrook). The symmetrical building features Queen Anne style architecture. The cost of the original building was £41,862.

The hospital was expanded between 1907 and 1908 and again in 1912, including the addition of an outpatients department, sanitary block, new wing, and expansion of the west wing. A private ward with 9 single rooms was built in 1925. The construction was funded by a donation from Jane Isabella Lewis. The ward was named the Harvey Lewis Wing in memory of her late husband, the politician and lawyer John Harvey Lewis.

In 1915, a bronze relief by Albert Power of ophthalmologist Sir Henry Rosborough Swanzy, father of artist Mary Swanzy, was added to the stair hall. In 1932, improvements were carried out at a cost of £57,000. In 1937 and 1939, further works were undertaken on the drainage system, entrance drive, gates, railings, and other additions and alterations. The Graham Audiology Clinic opened in 1961.

== Administration ==
The hospital is a registered charity governed by a President, Council and Hospital Management Group. It forms part of the Ireland East Hospital Group.

=== Presidents of RVEEH ===
Name	From	To
Henry Power Charles Stanley Monck, 5th Viscount Monck	1897	1919
Sir George Roche	1919	1932
Charles Campbell, 2nd Baron Glenavy	1932	1963
P.J. Kiely	1963	1976
J. McAuliffe-Curtin	1977	1979
H.J. Boylan	1979	1981
J. Donnelly	1981	1987
Dr. T.K. Whitaker	1987	1991
Mr. Justice Frank Griffin	1991	1996
H.J. Byrne	1996	2000
Dr. Jim Ruane	2000	2015
Patrick Dowling	2015	2021
Aisling Dodgson	2021	Present

== Services ==
The hospital provides 80 beds, of which 60 are in-patient and the remaining 20 located in the day care unit. 10 beds are reserved for paediatric patients. Two-thirds of beds are designated for ophthalmology patients, with the remaining third for ear, nose and throat patients. Service is provided to over 90,000 patients annually, including more than 7,000 in-patients, 40,000 out-patients, and 40,000 emergency department attendees.

== Education ==
RVEEH is the main teaching hospital for trainee ophthalmologists on the Irish College of Ophthalmologists and Royal College of Surgeons in Ireland training scheme. It is the only centre which provides postgraduate examinations for the qualification Membership of the Royal College of Surgeons in Ireland (MRCSI (Ophth)). Undergraduate medical students from the Royal College of Surgeons in Ireland and Trinity College Dublin also attend for rotations in ophthalmology and ear, nose, and throat surgery. In June 2011, Taoiseach Enda Kenny opened a €1.3 million Education and Conference Centre.

== Research ==
Several MD and PhD students are attached to the hospital. Trainees can receive funding from the Royal Victoria Eye and Ear Hospital Research Foundation. The Eithne Walls Research Fund was established in memory of ophthalmology trainee Dr. Eithne Walls who was lost in the Air France Flight 447 crash.
