= James Rawson Carroll =

Irish architect (1830–1911)

James Rawson Carroll FRIA (Note: Fellow of the Royal Irish Academy)
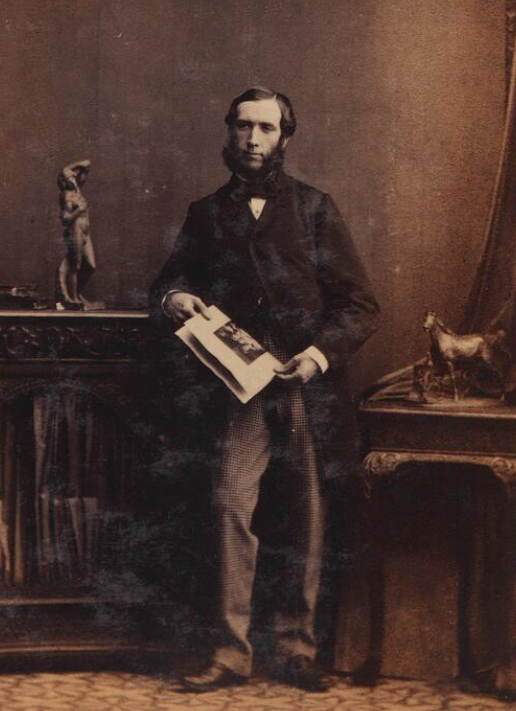
- Carroll in 1862
- Born: 1830; Dublin, Ireland
- Died: 30 November 1911 (aged 80–81); Dublin, Ireland
- Education: Royal Dublin Society School of Drawing in Architecture
- Occupation: Architect
- Buildings: Classiebawn Castle; Sligo Courthouse; Royal Victoria Eye and Ear Hospital; St. Philip and St. James Church

James Rawson Carroll, FRIA (1830 – November 30, 1911) was an Irish architect who was involved in many projects throughout Ireland during the Victorian era. He was a founding partner of the Carroll & Batchelor architectural firm in 1892, alongside Frederick Batchelor.

== Life ==
Born in Dublin in 1830, James was the youngest son of Thomas Carroll, of Leinster Street and Waterloo Road. He had four known siblings, three brothers – Thomas, Howard and Charles – and a sister whose name is unknown but was the mother of architect John Howard Pentland. He was educated in Delgany, County Wicklow and was admitted to the Royal Dublin Society's School of Drawing in Architecture in 1846. He was subsequently articled to George Fowler Jones of York, England and worked as his assistant until 1856. His brother Thomas built the stonework for Castle Oliver, County Limerick in 1850, which was designed by Jones. During his time in England, Carroll also worked at the office of John Raphael Brandon. Carroll returned to Ireland in 1857 and set up his own practice at 180 Great Brunswick Street, Dublin.

As Ireland recovered from the Famine in the late 19th century, Carroll was able to gain considerable experience designing country houses, ornate churches and public buildings. He presented designs at the Royal Dublin Society's Exhibition of Fine Arts in 1861 and was later chosen as the lead architect for British Prime Minister Lord Palmerston's estate home at Mullaghmore, County Sligo. However, Classiebawn Castle was not completed until 1874, nine years after Palmerston's death. In 1870 he was appointed the architect for the Diocese of Kilmore, Elphin and Ardagh. Carroll twice represented Ireland at the General Conference of Architects at the RIBA in London, in 1876 and 1878.

Carroll's nephew John Howard Pentland was articled to him from 1872 to 1877, after which they worked together for several years, eventually partnering as J Rawson Carroll & Pentland from 1882 to 1884. In 1892 Carroll formed a new architectural partnership with his chief assistant Frederick Batchelor, called Carroll & Batchelor. As a result of changing social conditions in rural Ireland, most of the projects undertaken by Carroll & Batchelor were large public works concentrated in County Dublin. In particular, the firm designed numerous hospitals throughout the 1890s and early 1900s. Carroll was less interested in these projects as he preferred work that had a more personal character. He retired in 1905.

His last registered address was at 56 Lower Mount Street, Dublin. He died on 30 November 1911. At the time of his death, he left his widow Louisa M. Carroll a sum of £4,075 (equivalent to around £365,000 in 2022). His obituary in the Irish Builder described him as:

a kindly, upright, courteous gentleman', whose 'clients were in a real sense his friends, no trouble was too great for him to take; indeed, his attention to detail was extraordinary, and therein lay the secret of much of his success.

== Work ==
The nature of Carroll's work was very heavily influenced by the social conditions of his day. Many of his earlier works were either "Big Houses" for the Anglo-Irish landed gentry or Anglican churches for the Church of Ireland, which built dozens of churches in rural Ireland during the latter half of the 1800s in an attempt to expand its influence in traditionally Catholic areas.

Carroll's later career coincided with a period of upheaval and instability in Ireland. External factors such as the Great Agricultural Depression (1873–1896), widespread rural agitation and violence ("the Land War"), the rise of the Irish National Land League, and the land reform acts of 1885 and 1891 heralded the end of the estates period in Ireland. The Anglo-Irish aristocracy grew increasingly indebted and could no longer fund the construction of grand estate homes or churches in their locale.

Work on such projects all but dried up by 1890 and Carroll spent the last decade of his career overseeing the design or remodelling of public buildings, especially hospitals.

=== Attributed buildings ===
- St. Philip and St. James Church, Booterstown – extension and remodelling
- Christ Church, Leeson Park – won a competition to design the church in 1859
- St Mary's Church, Athlone – added chancel in 1869
- Saint John's Church, Abington – designed and built in 1869
- The Mageough – retirement complex in Rathmines, designed in 1871, built in 1878
- Classiebawn Castle – designed in Baronial style for then-British Prime Minister Lord Palmerston
- Sligo Courthouse – ornate French gothic courthouse. Housed Sligo County Council from 1898 to 1979.
- Hardwicke Fever Hospital – new isolation hospital (1893)
- Richmond Surgical Hospital – new red brick and terracotta hospital in the English Renaissance style (1899–1901)
- Royal Hospital for Incurables (Royal Hospital Donnybook) – new nurses' home (ca. 1900)
- Royal Victoria Eye and Ear Hospital – new hospital (1902–1906)
- St. Mark's Ophthalmic Hospital – new buildings for outpatients and 120 inpatients with "sanitary annexes"
- St. Edmundsbury Hospital, Lucan – additions, alterations, repairs to roof (1902)
- Whitworth Fever Hospital (Drumcondra Hospital) – addition of outermost blocks (ca. 1900)

=== Gallery ===
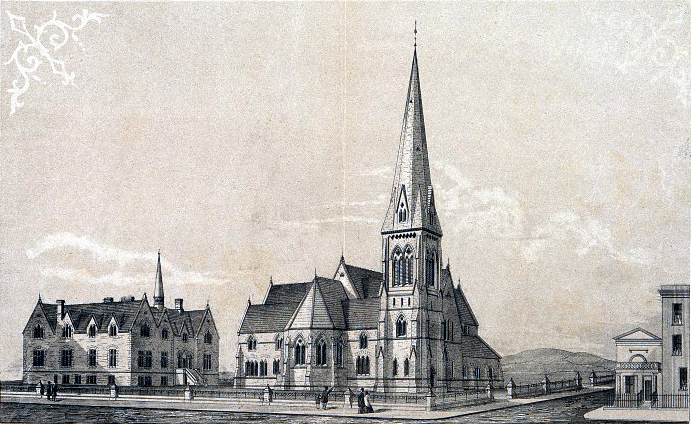
Christ Church Chapel
(1860)

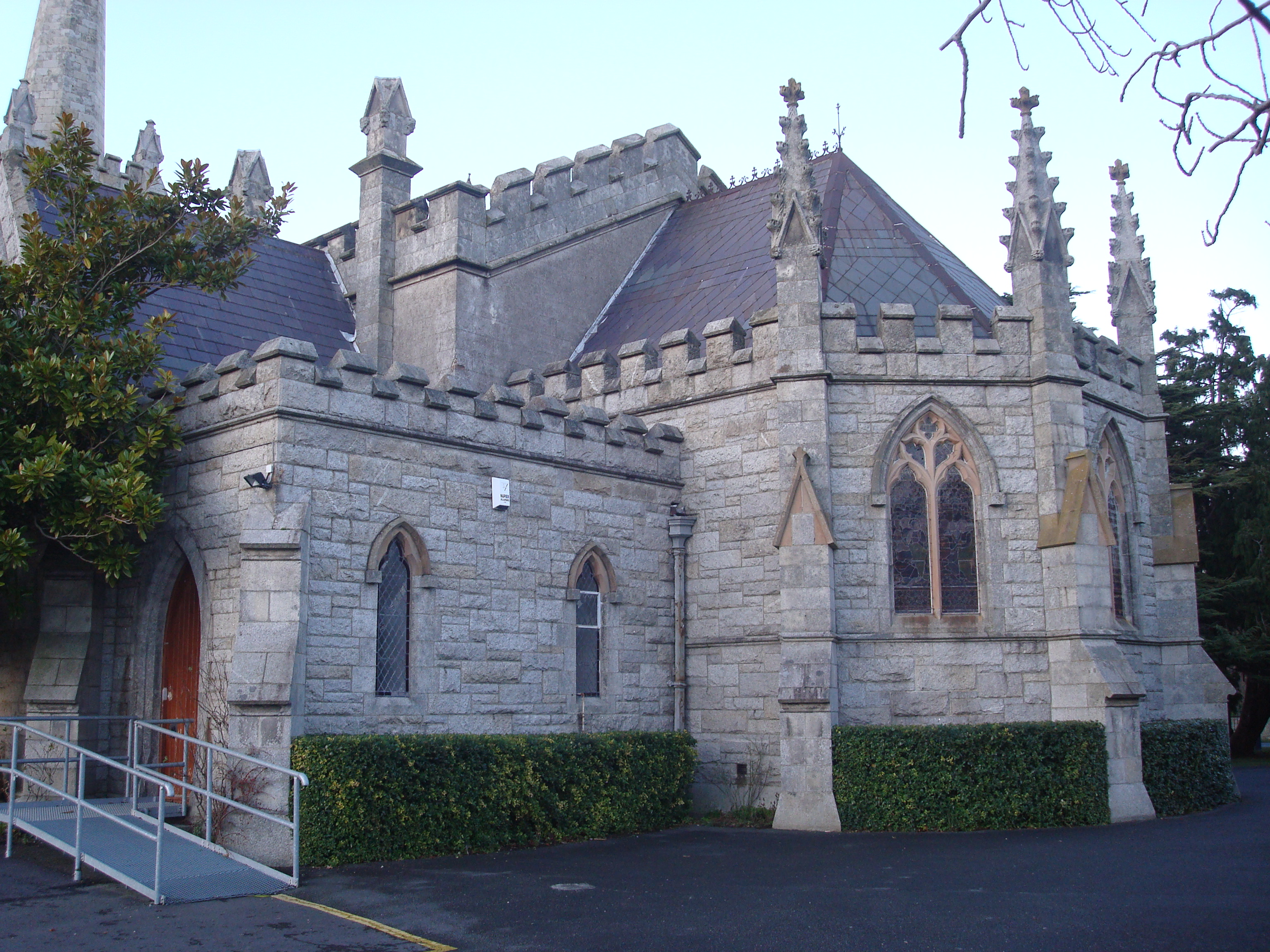
St. Philip and St. James Church, Booterstown
(1868)

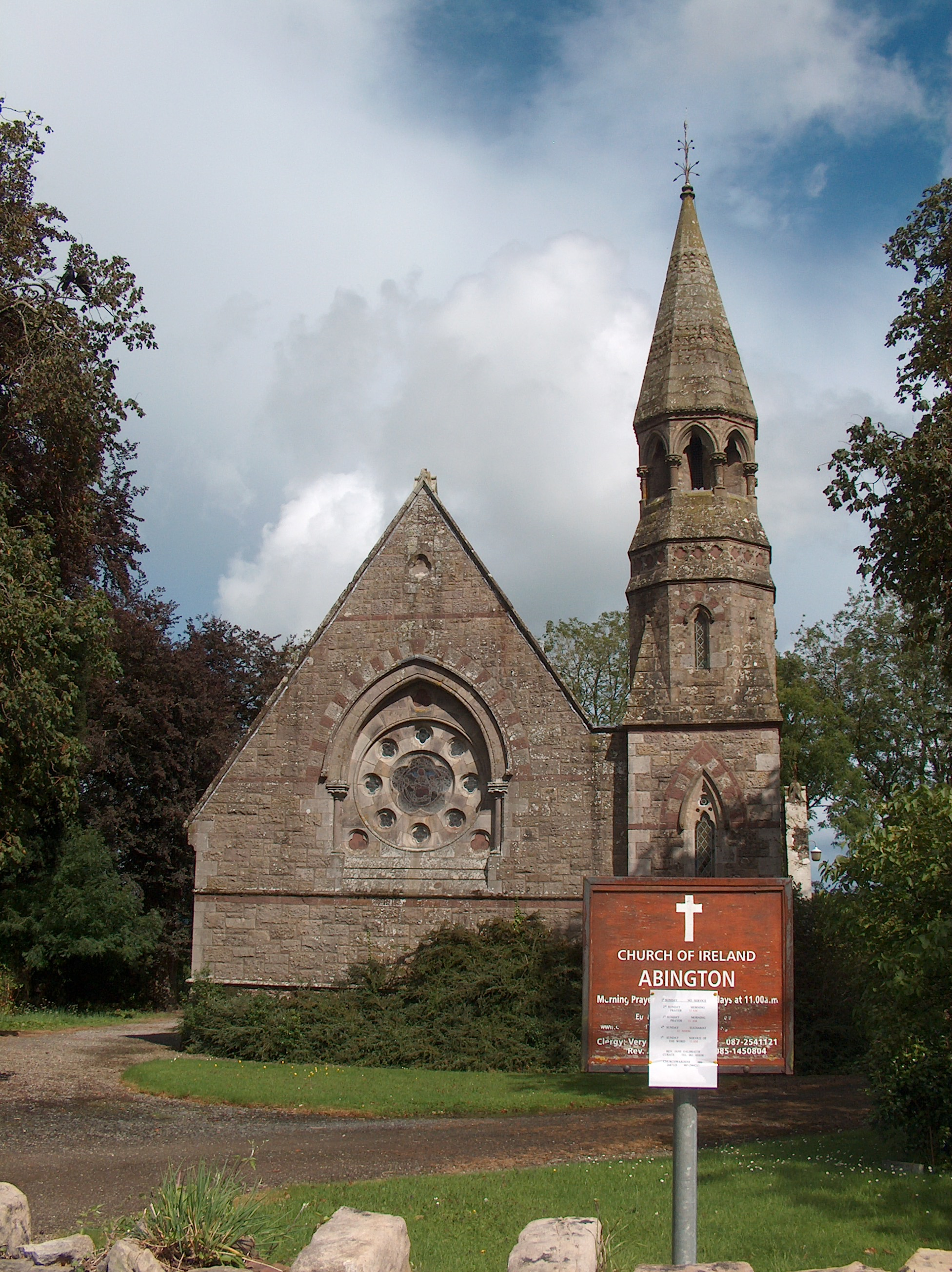
Saint John's Church, Abington
(1869)

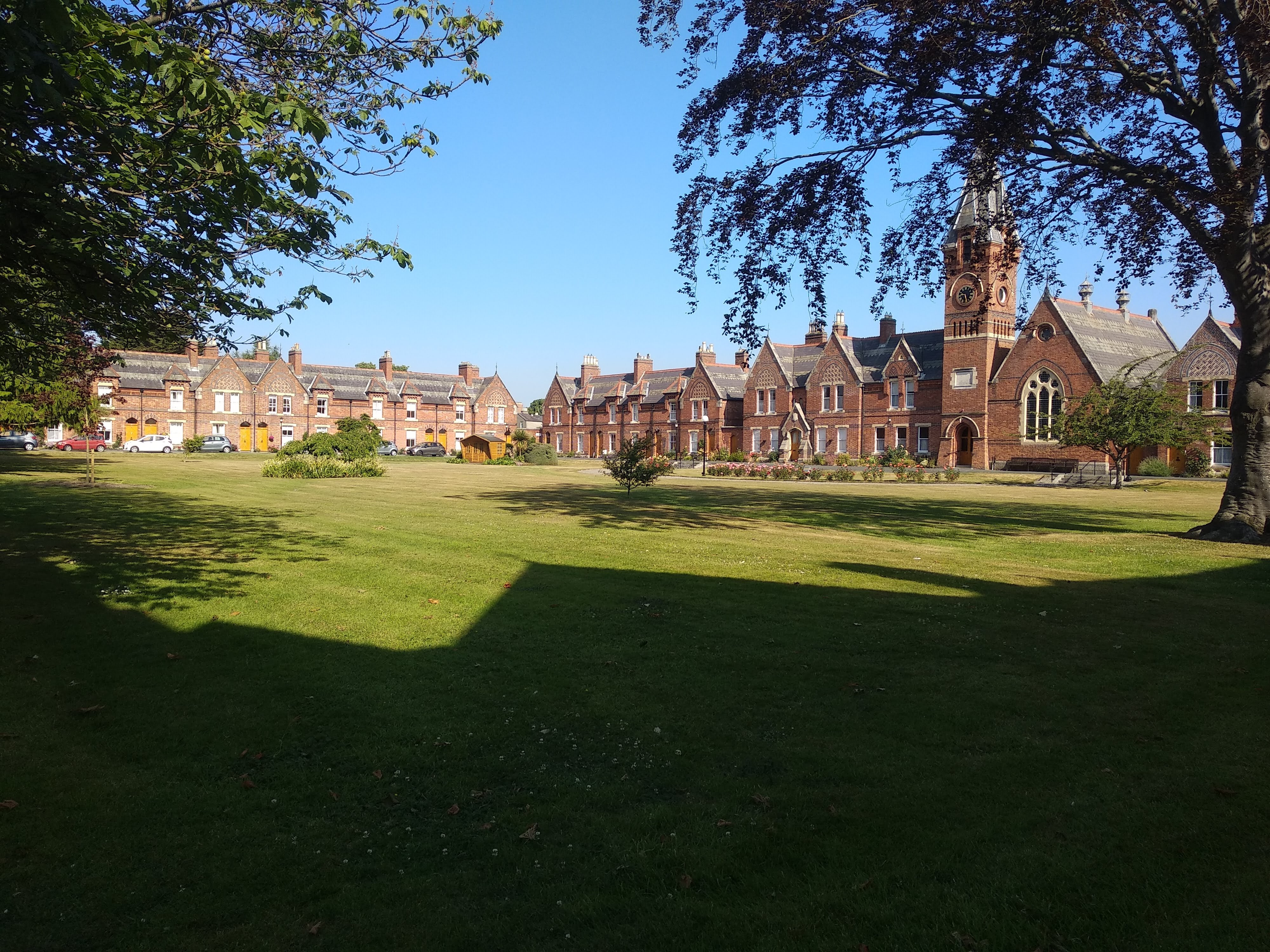
The Mageough
(1871)

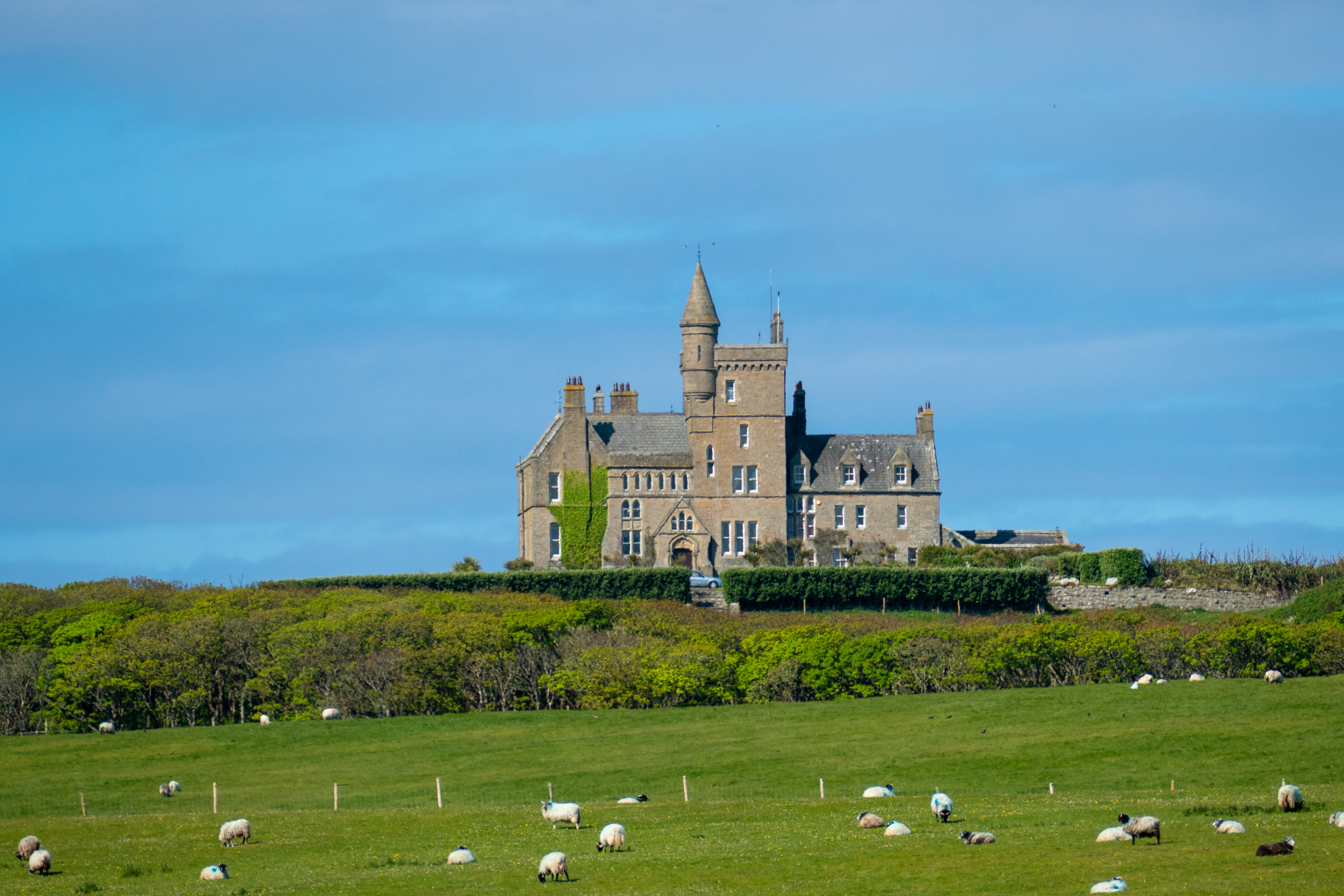
Classiebawn Castle
(1874)

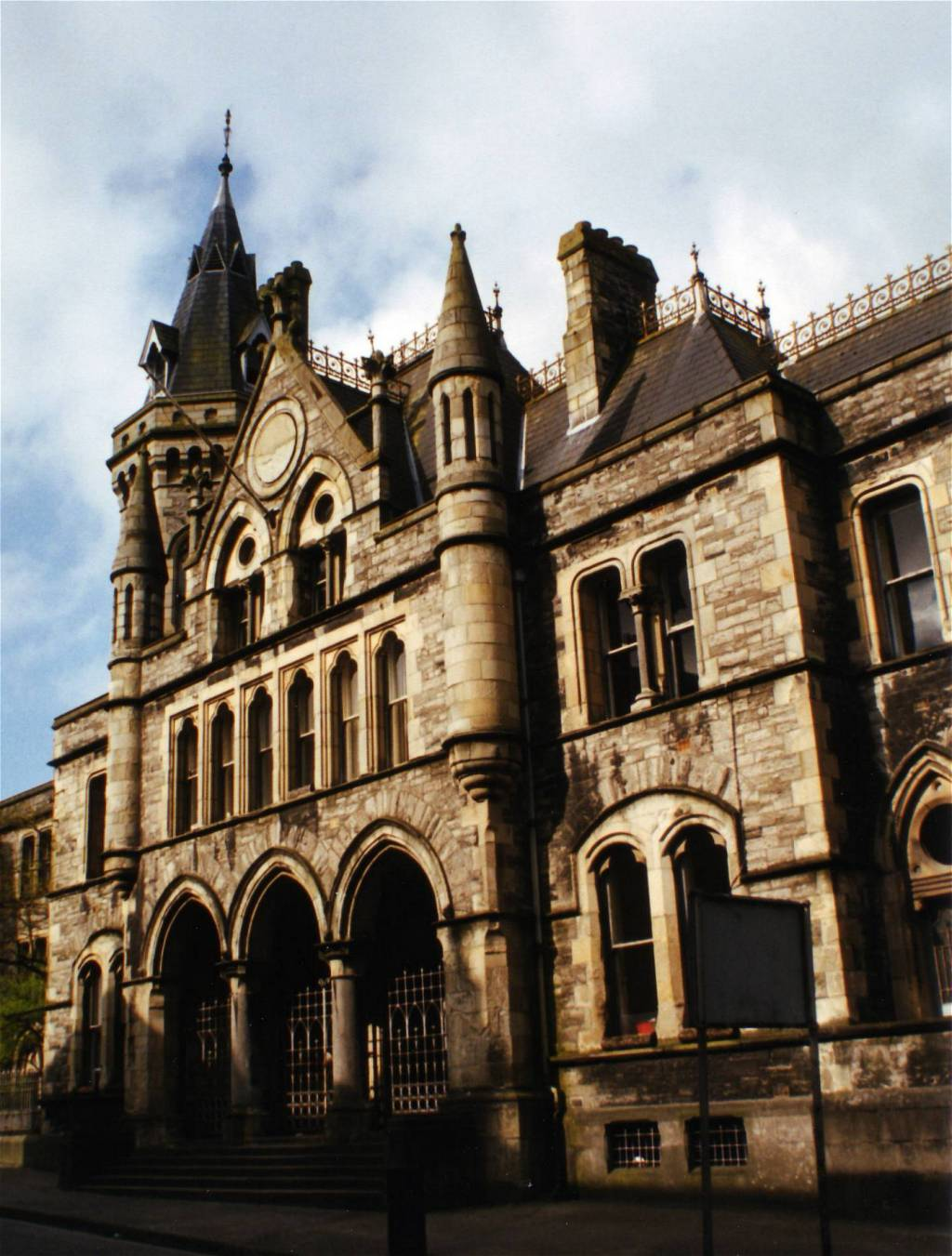
Sligo Courthouse
(1878)

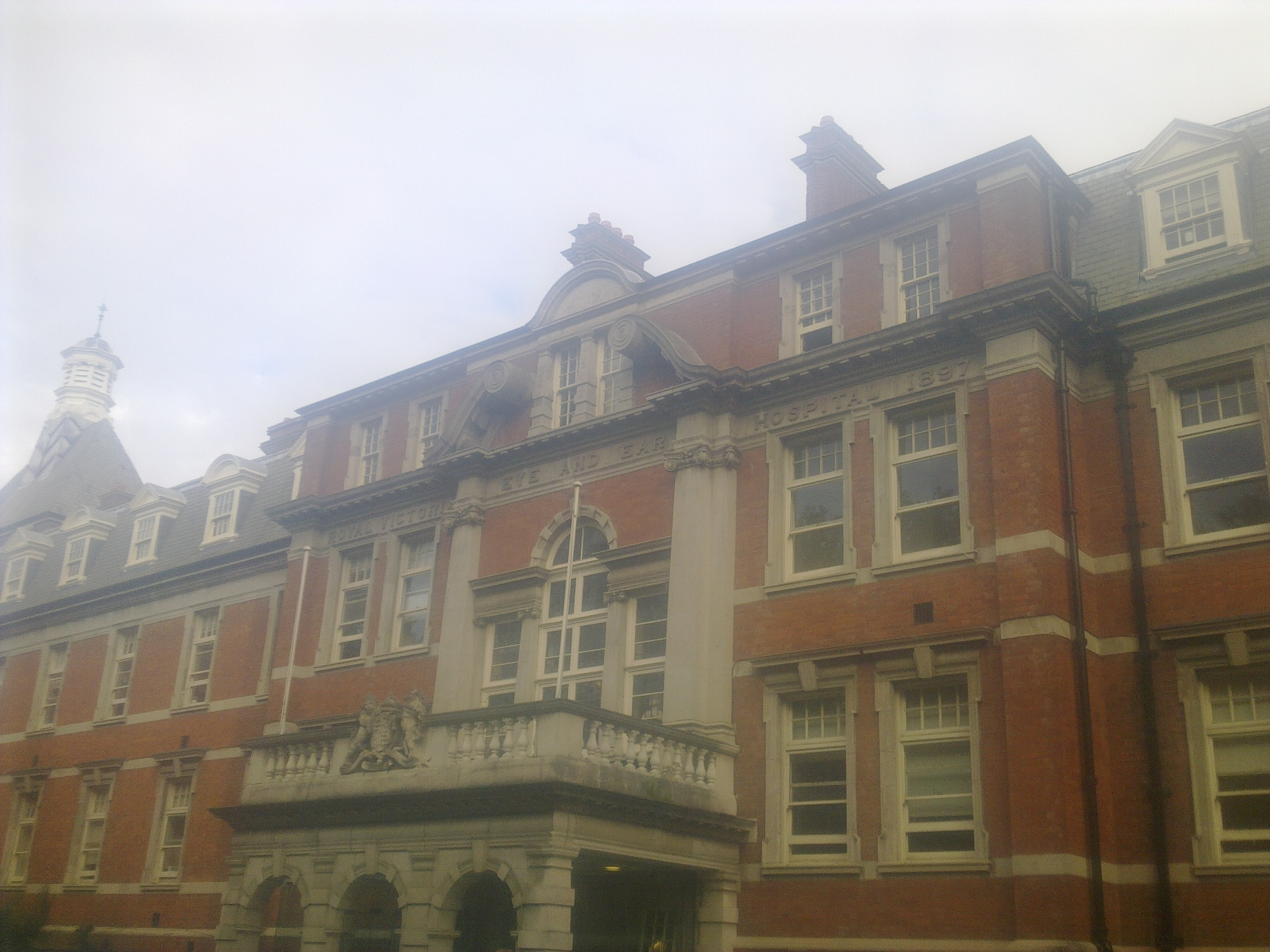
Royal Victoria Eye and Ear Hospital
(1895)

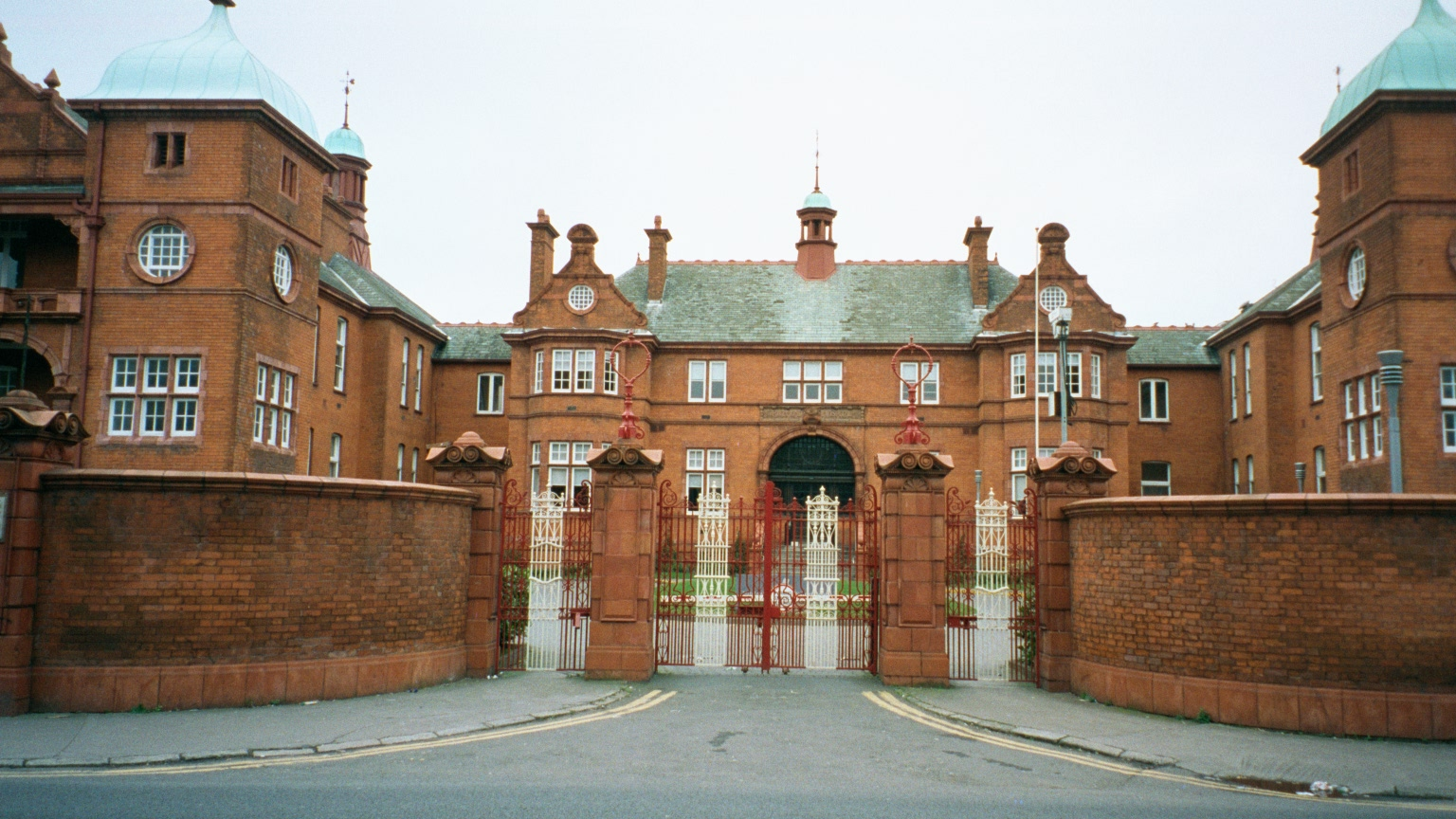
Richmond Surgical Hospital
(1901)

== See also ==
- Architecture of Ireland
- Dictionary of Irish Architects
