= Mageough Home =

Retirement complex in Rathmines, Dublin, Ireland

Mageough
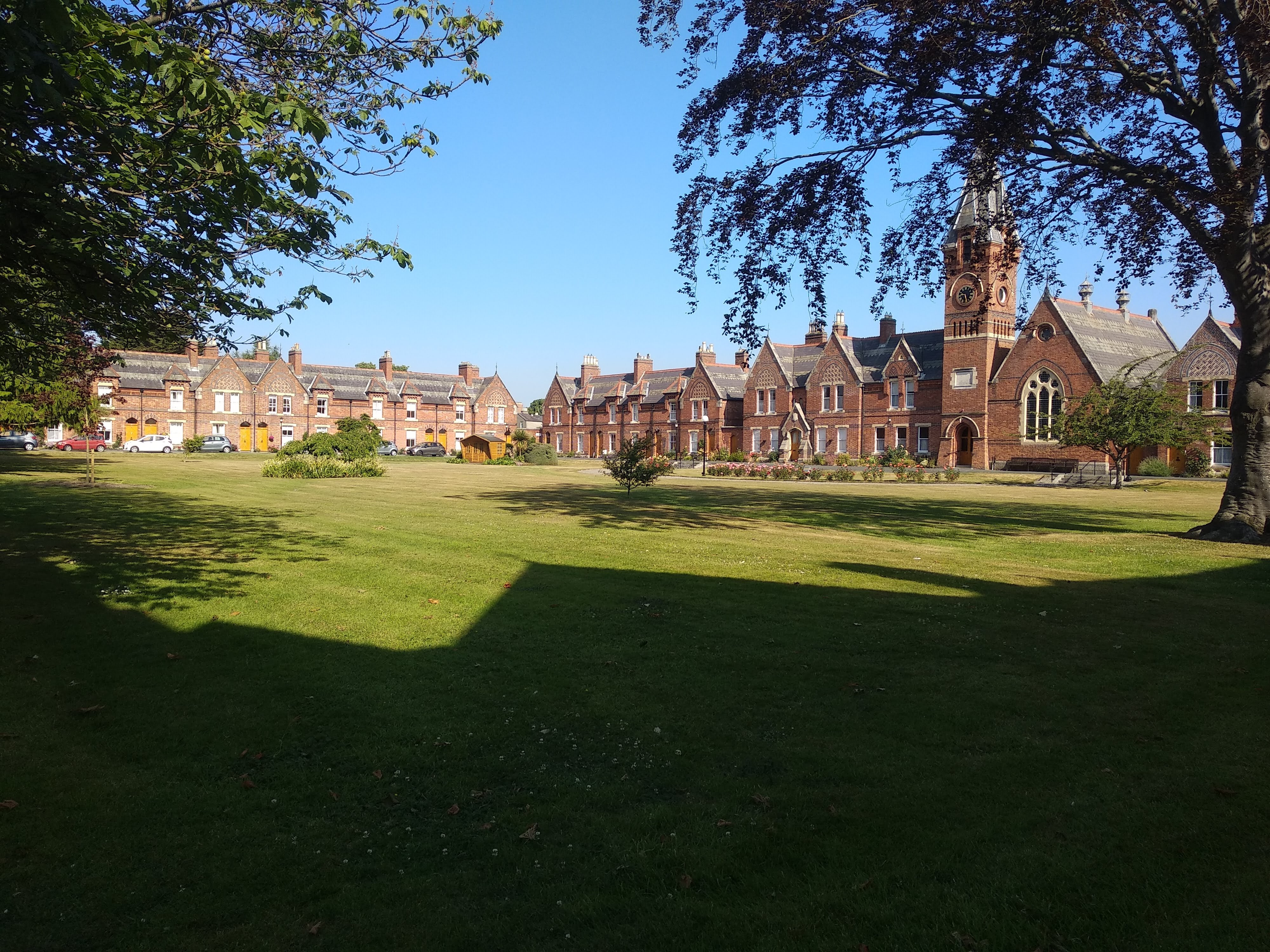

- Location within Dublin
- Etymology: Named for its founder, Elizabeth Mageough

General information
- Status: Active
- Architectural style: Victorian, Gothic Revival
- Location: 37-39 Cowper Road, Rathmines, Dublin, Ireland
- Coordinates: 53°19′00″N 6°15′22″W
- Completed: 1878
- Opened: 1878

Design and construction
- Architect: James Rawson Carroll

Other information
- Public transit: Cowper

Website
- mageough.ie

The Mageough /məˈɡɒf/, is a 19th-century retirement home in Rathmines, southern Dublin, Ireland.

== History ==
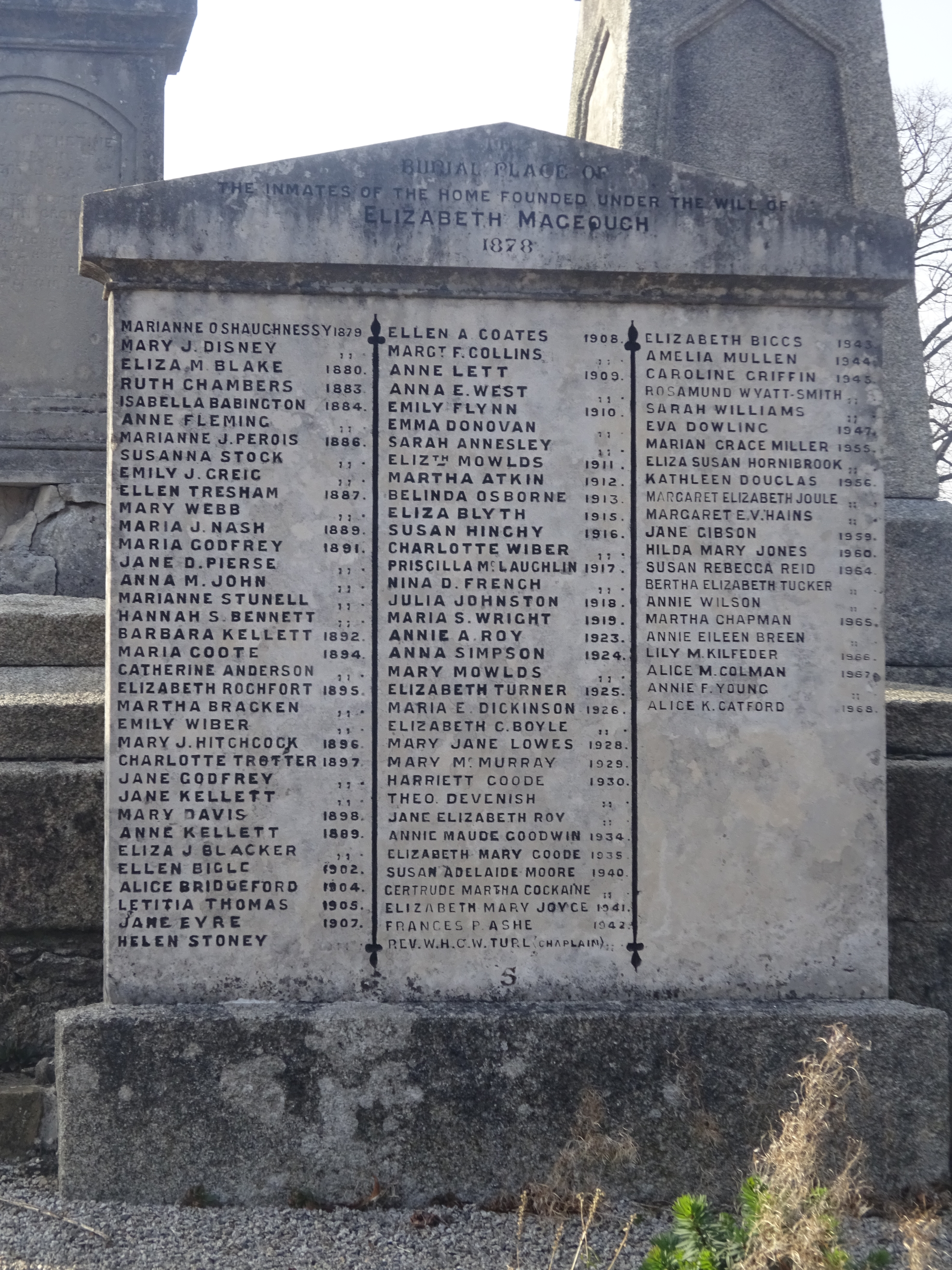
Grave in Mount Jerome of several women who lived in the Mageough. Note the predominance of British surnames, reflecting the Protestant population.

The Mageough Home was built by the bequest of Miss Elizabeth Mageough, who died in 1869 and left much of her money to fund "a suitable place for elderly ladies of the Protestant faith to live". The home was built to the designs of James Rawson Carroll on land purchased from William Cowper-Temple, 1st Baron Mount Temple. The site was known locally as "The Bloody Fields"; 2,000 Catholic and Royalist troops had been killed by Roundheads and buried there during the Irish Confederate Wars. The first residents moved in November 1878. They were required to be "of good character and sobriety." In 1883, Rev. Benjamin Gibson was chaplain, Richard J. Leeper was registrar and a Mrs Le Breton Simmons was lady superintendent.

It is still run today as a residential complex for older people with 36 small homes.

== Structure ==
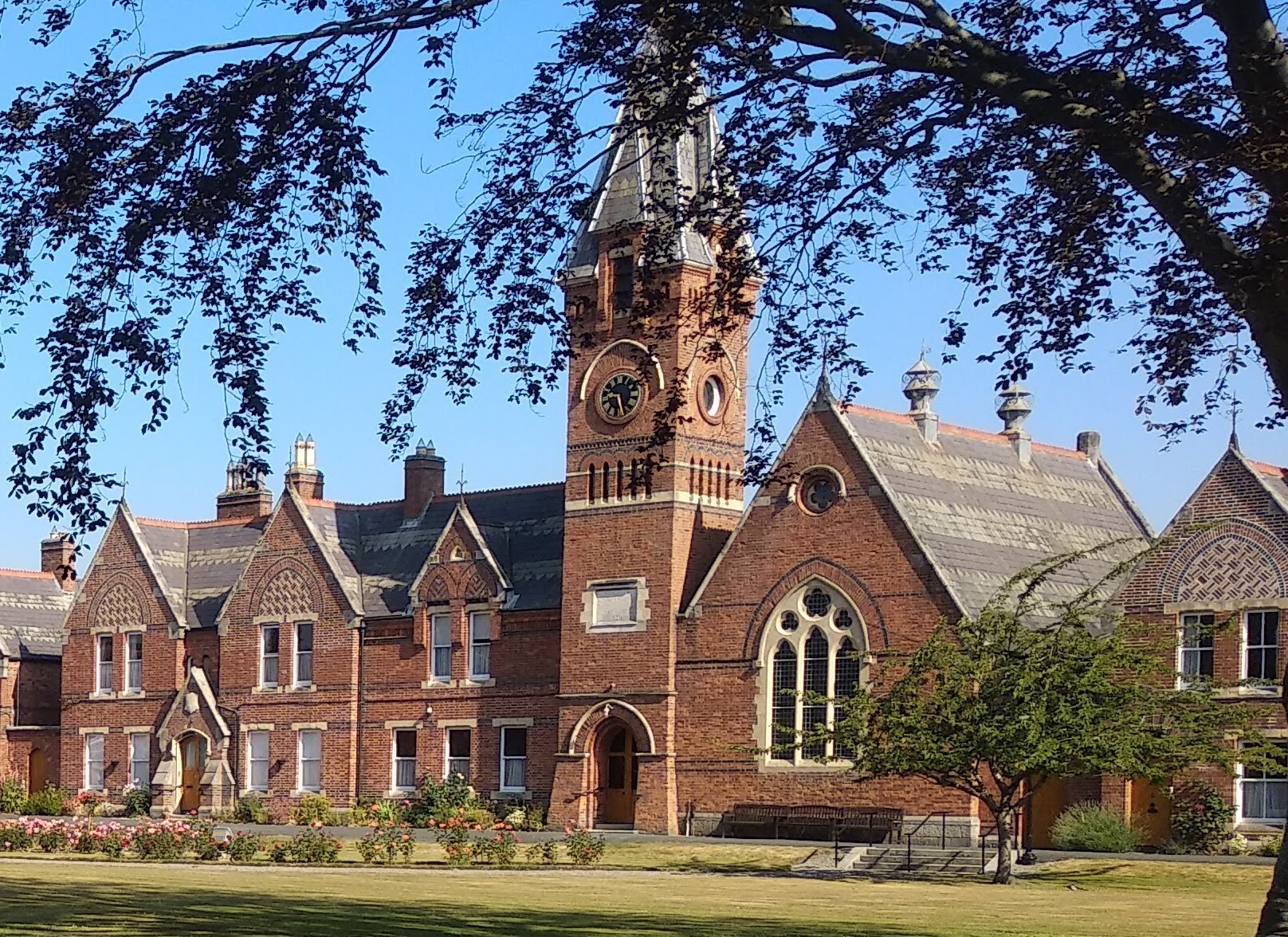
Image showing the chapel and some residential buildings

The complex is built of red brick and slate in a Gothic Revival style. Thirty-nine houses, an infirmary and a Church of Ireland chapel surround a central green.

The houses, chapel, infirmary, gate lodge, stone boundary walls, gate piers and gates are all protected structures.
