= Classiebawn Castle =

Historic building in County Sligo, Ireland

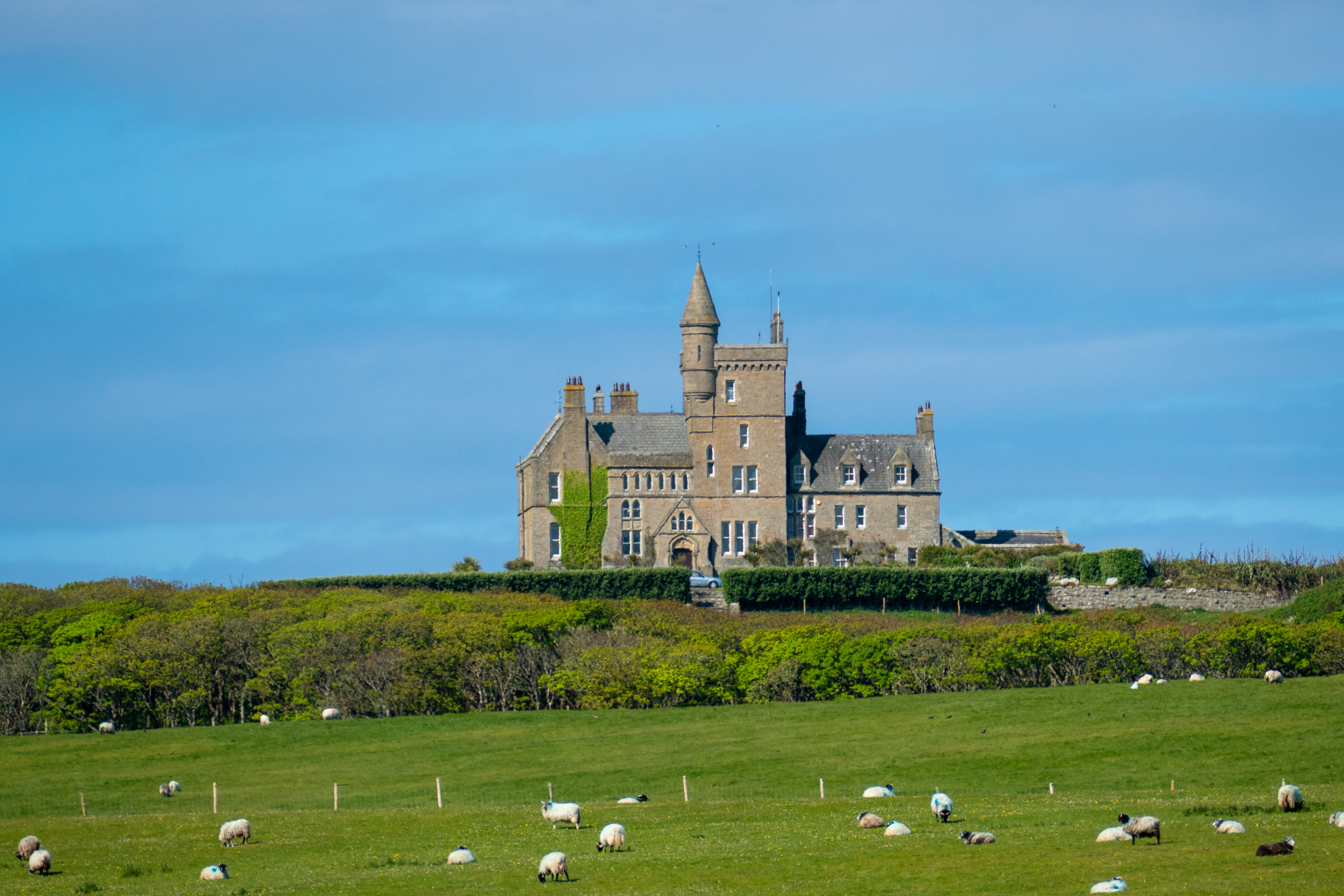

- Location within Ireland

General information
- Location: Mullaghmore, County Sligo, Ireland
- Coordinates: 54°27′18″N 8°28′10″W
- Completed: 1874
- Client: Lord Palmerston

Design and construction
- Architect: J. Rawson Carroll

Classiebawn Castle is a country house on the Mullaghmore Peninsula near the village of Cliffoney in County Sligo, Ireland. It was built in the late 19th century for British Prime Minister Lord Palmerston (1784–1865) on what was then a 4,000-hectare (10,000-acre) estate.

== History ==
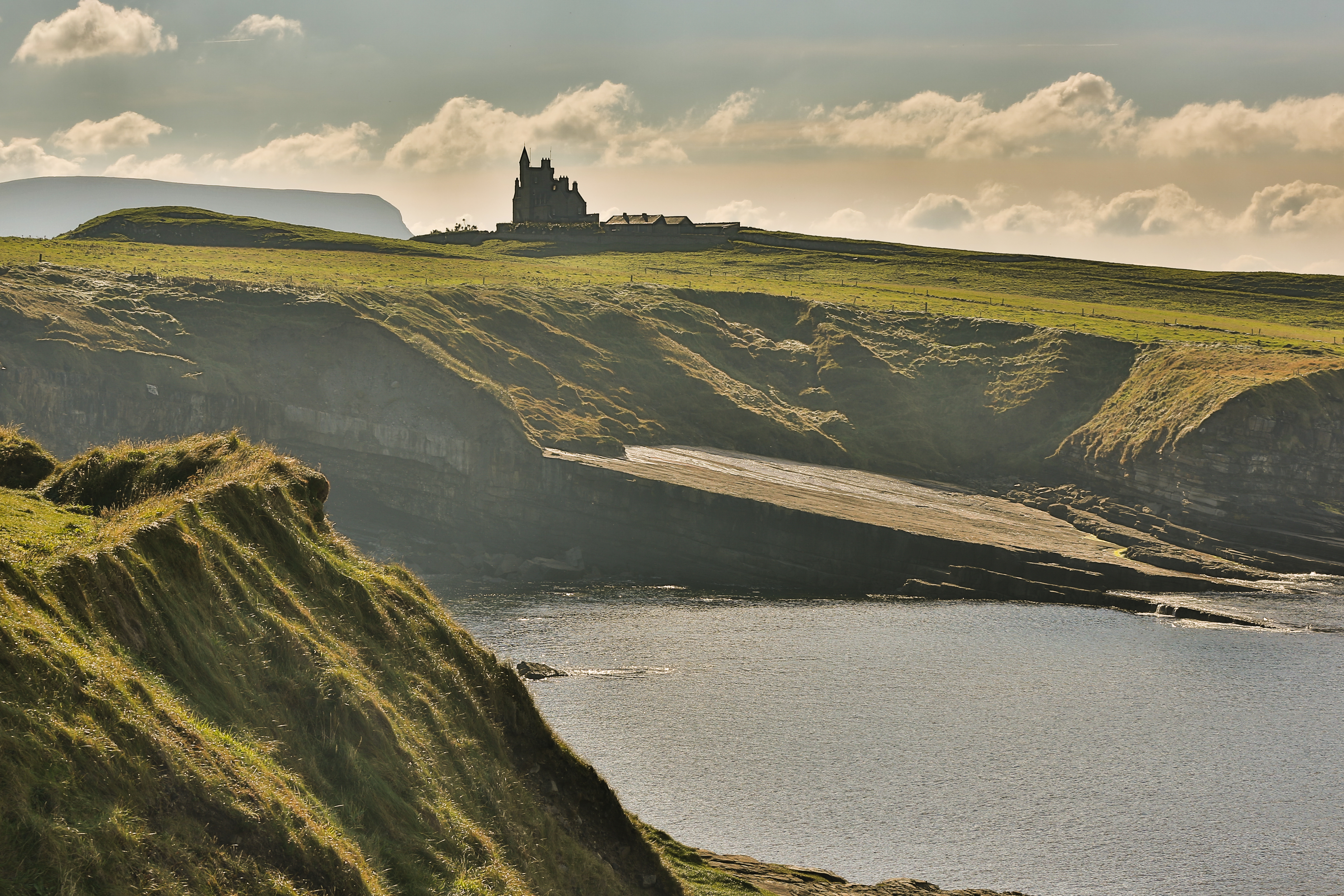
Classiebawn overlooking the Atlantic Ocean

The building was designed in the Baronial style by the Dublin architect James Rawson Carroll, and is constructed from a yellow-brown sandstone brought by sea from County Donegal. It comprises a gabled range with a central tower topped by a conical roofed turret.

The land, which once belonged to the O'Connor Sligo family, was confiscated by the English Parliament to compensate the people who put down an Irish rebellion. Around 4,000 hectares (10,000 acres) of land on which Classiebawn now stands was granted to Sir John Temple (1600–1677), Master of the Rolls in Ireland.

The property passed down to the 3rd Viscount Palmerston, a statesman who served as both British prime minister and British foreign secretary. It was this Lord Palmerston who commissioned the building of the current Classiebawn Castle and the harbour at Mullaghmore. The house was not complete upon his death in 1865 but was completed in 1874 by his stepson and successor, William Cowper-Temple (later created the 1st Baron Mount Temple). The latter died childless in 1888 and the estate passed to his nephew, Evelyn Ashley, the second surviving son of the 7th Earl of Shaftesbury. Evelyn Ashley spent some time there each year and on his death in 1907 was succeeded by his only son, Wilfrid Ashley (later created Baron Mount Temple in a new creation). He also spent his summers at the castle with his daughters Edwina, the future Countess Mountbatten of Burma, and Mary (1906–1986), who was Baroness Delamere from 1944 until 1955 as the second wife (of three) of the 4th Baron Delamere.

=== Mountbatten years ===
In 1916, the house was vacated and stood empty until 1950. It was inherited in July 1939 by Edwina Mountbatten (then formally styled as Lady Louis Mountbatten), who, with her husband, Admiral of the Fleet The 1st Earl Mountbatten of Burma (as he later became), made several improvements, installing electricity and a mains water supply. After his wife's death in February 1960, Lord Mountbatten of Burma, the last Viceroy of India, spent his summers there until his death when his boat was blown up off the coast of Mullaghmore by the Provisional Irish Republican Army (Provisional IRA) in August 1979.

The castle and surrounding lands are now owned by the estate of Hugh Tunney (1928–2011), a businessman from Trillick in County Tyrone, who bought the castle and 1,200 hectares (3,000 acres) of the surrounding estate in 1991 after having leased it for many years.
