= Mullaghmore Peninsula =

Peninsula in County Sligo, Ireland

An Mullach Mór
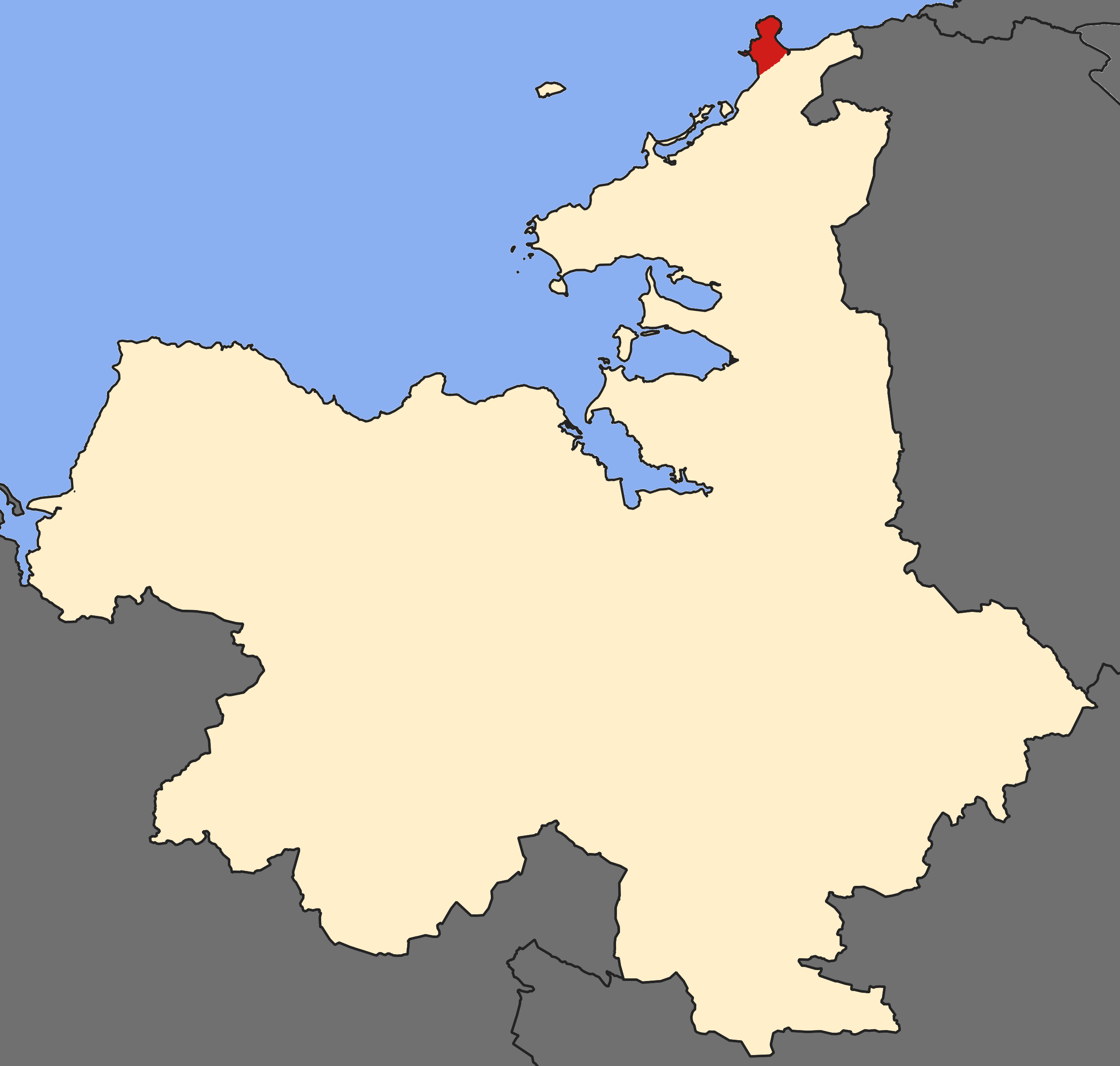
- Mullaghmore Peninsula (red) in County Sligo
- Interactive map of Mullaghmore Peninsula

Geography
- Location: Ireland
- Coordinates: 54°27′40″N 8°27′35″W
- Adjacent to: Atlantic Ocean
- Area: 5.1 km^{2} (2.0 sq mi)

Administration
- Ireland
- County: Sligo

Demographics
- Population: 145 (2016)
- Pop. density: 28.4/km^{2} (73.6/sq mi)

The Mullaghmore Peninsula (Irish: An Mullach Mór), also referred to as Mullaghmore Head, is a small peninsula in the north of County Sligo, Ireland. The coastal village of Mullaghmore is the peninsula's sole settlement. The village has 136 year-round residents according to the 2016 Census; however, its population is significantly higher during summer months. The peninsula is bounded by two large beaches on either side, has panoramic views of Ben Bulben and the Dartry Mountains and is a popular seaside destination.

The skyline of Mullaghmore is dominated by Classiebawn Castle, which was designed by Dublin architect James R. Carroll for The 3rd Viscount Palmerston. However, the castle was not completed until 1874, long after Lord Palmerston's death. Following its completion, the fishing village of Mullach Gearr was demolished to make room for the castle's 3,000 acre estate. The last surviving evicted resident of Mullach Gearr, Freddy McHugh, died in the 1960s. A memorial to the "lost village" was unveiled along Mullaghmore Head in 2017. The castle was left empty from 1916 to 1950, when it came into the possession of the Mountbatten family. Lord Mountbatten spent his summers at Classiebawn until his assassination in August 1979, when his boat was blown up in Mullaghmore harbour by the Provisional IRA.

In recent years, Mullaghmore has become a big wave surfing destination that attracts surfers and windsurfers from around the world. Billabong hosted Ireland's first ever big-wave surf contest in Mullaghmore in 2011. In March 2012, surfers rode waves up to 15 metres (49 ft) high off Mullaghmore Head. These waves were about five metres less than the tallest wave ever recorded in Ireland in County Donegal in December 2011, which was 20.4 metres (67 ft) high. In October 2020 Mullaghmore came even closer to the record, as a wave measuring 18.2 metres (60 ft) was recorded off its coast, which was ridden by Donegal big wave surfer Conor Maguire.

== Places of interest ==
- Bunduff Lough
- Bunduff Strand (Mullaghmore Beach)
- Classiebawn Castle
- Kilkilloge Ringfort
- Mullach Gearr Memorial
- Mullaghmore Harbour
- Mullaghmore Head sea cliffs
- Mullaghmore Lobster Sea Farm
- Mullaghmore Sailing Club
- Offshore boat tours
- Promontory forts
- Trawalua Beach
- The Watchtower

== Gallery ==
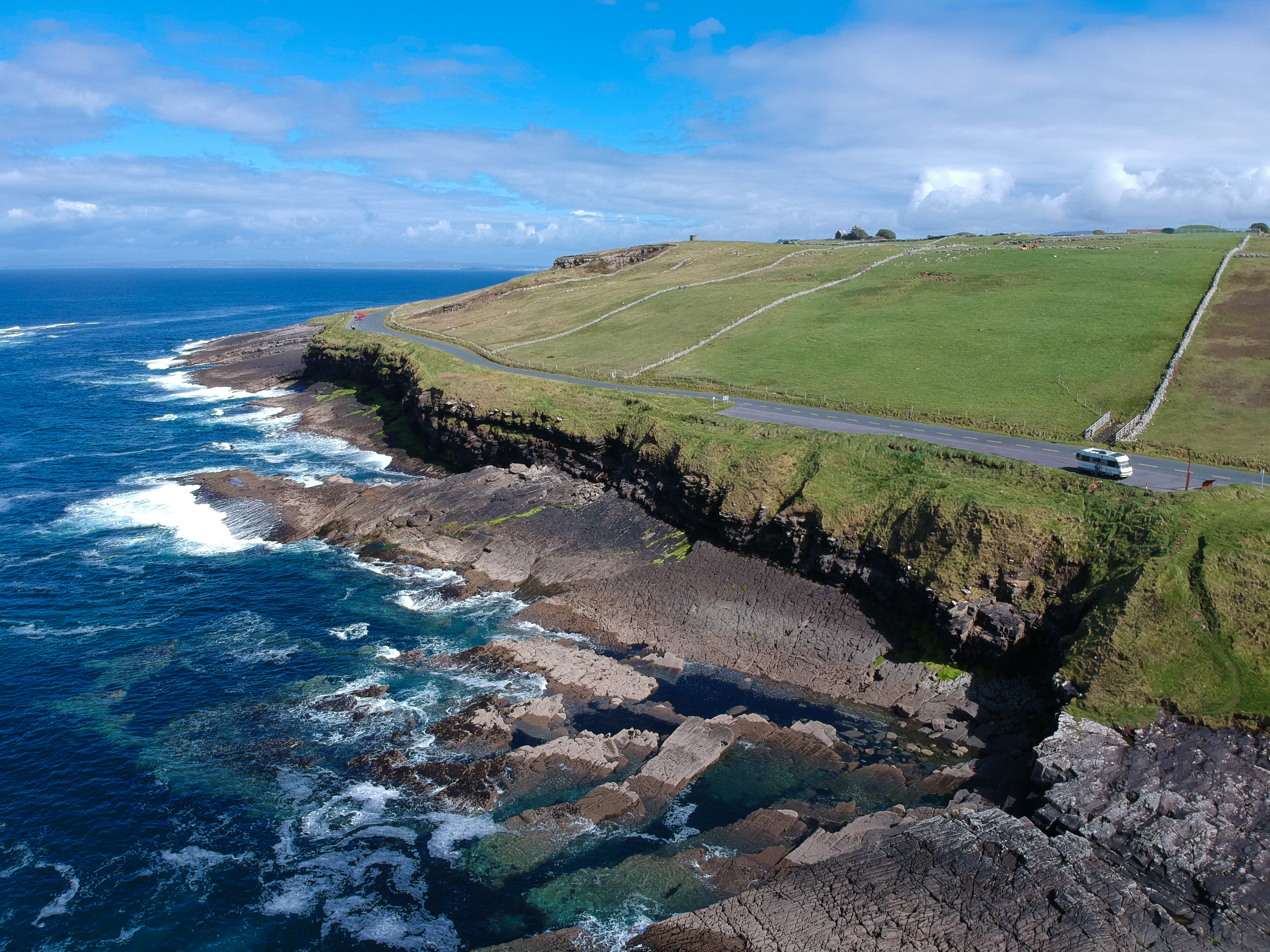
Sea cliffs

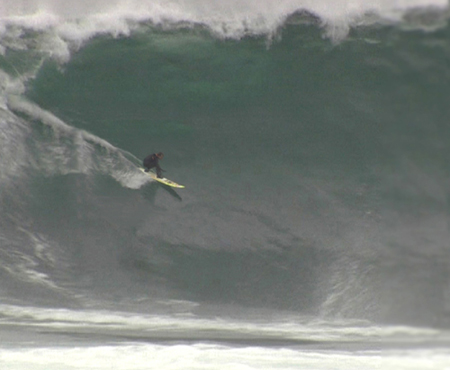
Big wave surfer at Mullaghmore

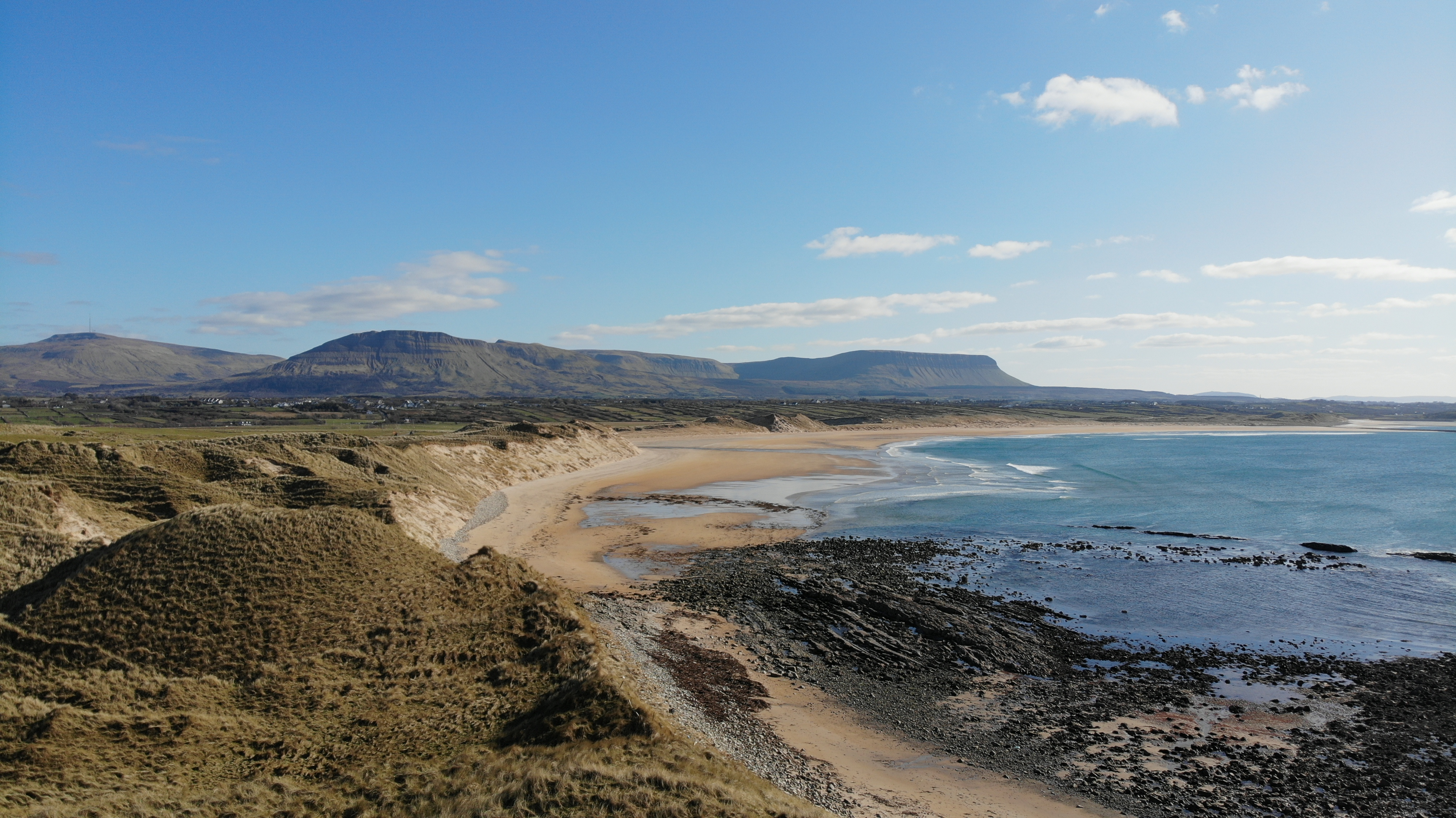
Trawalua Beach

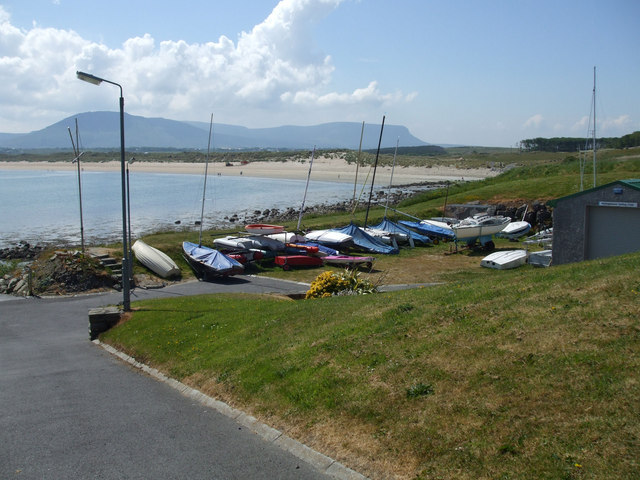
Bunduff Strand

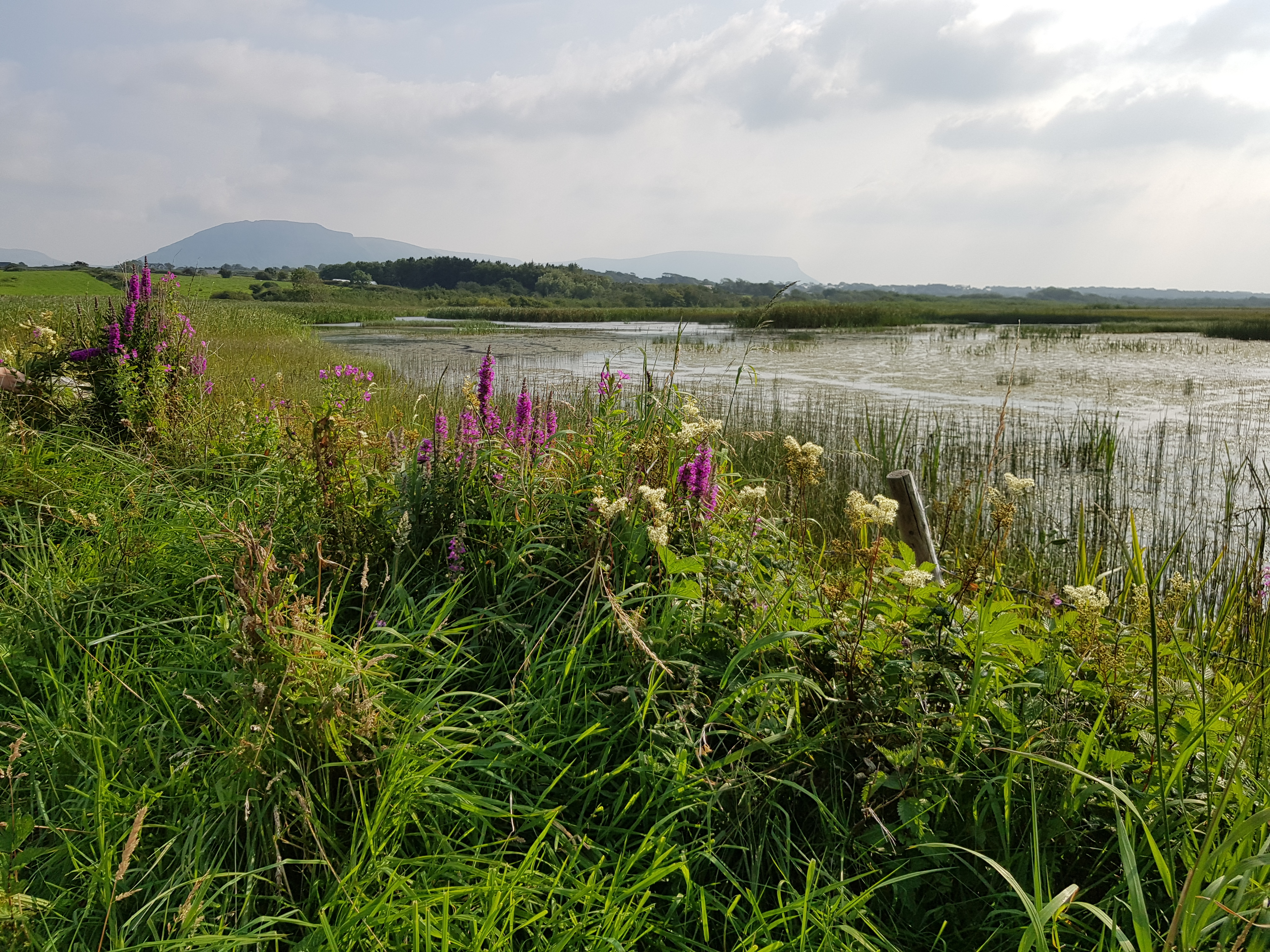
Bunduff Lough

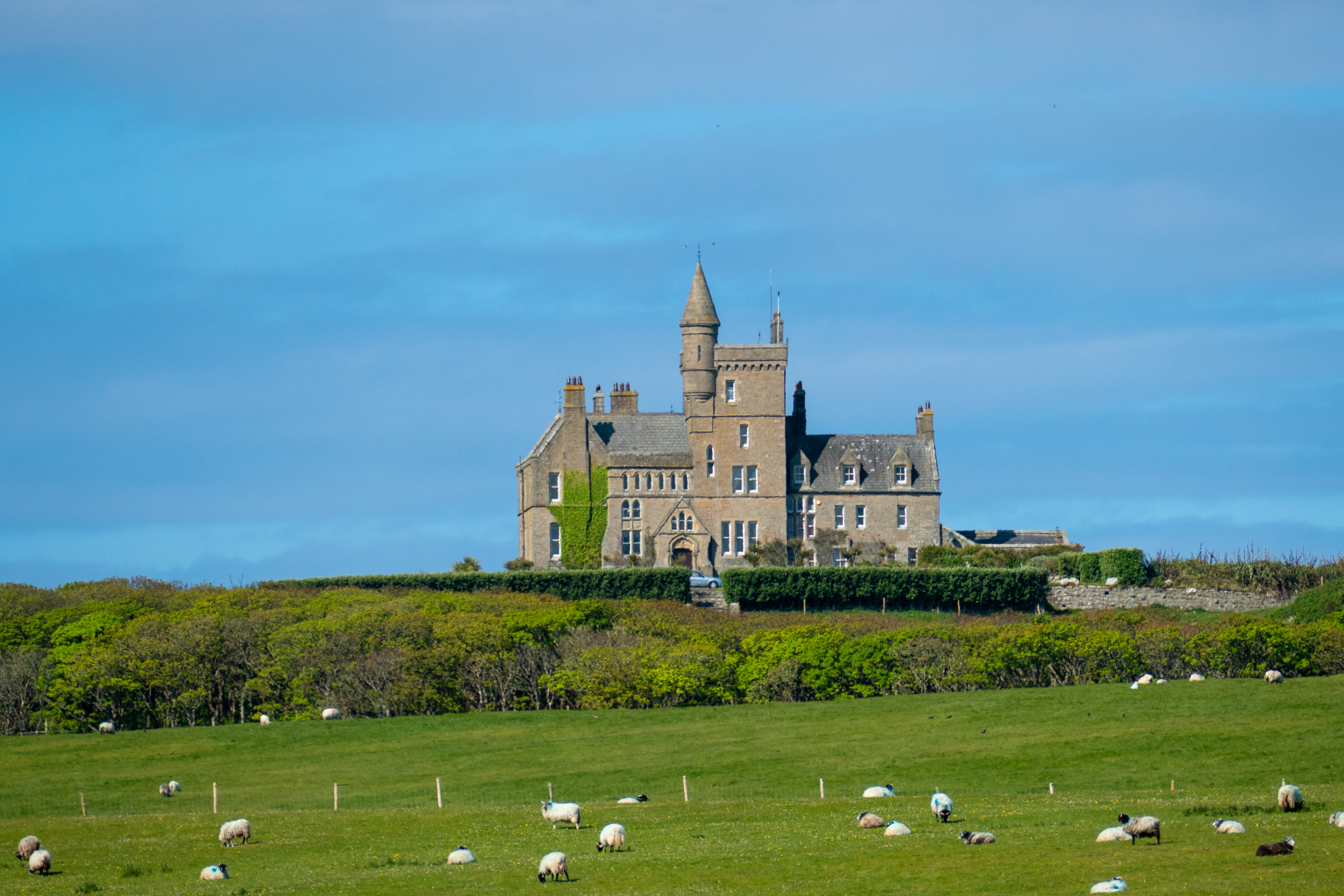
Classiebawn Castle

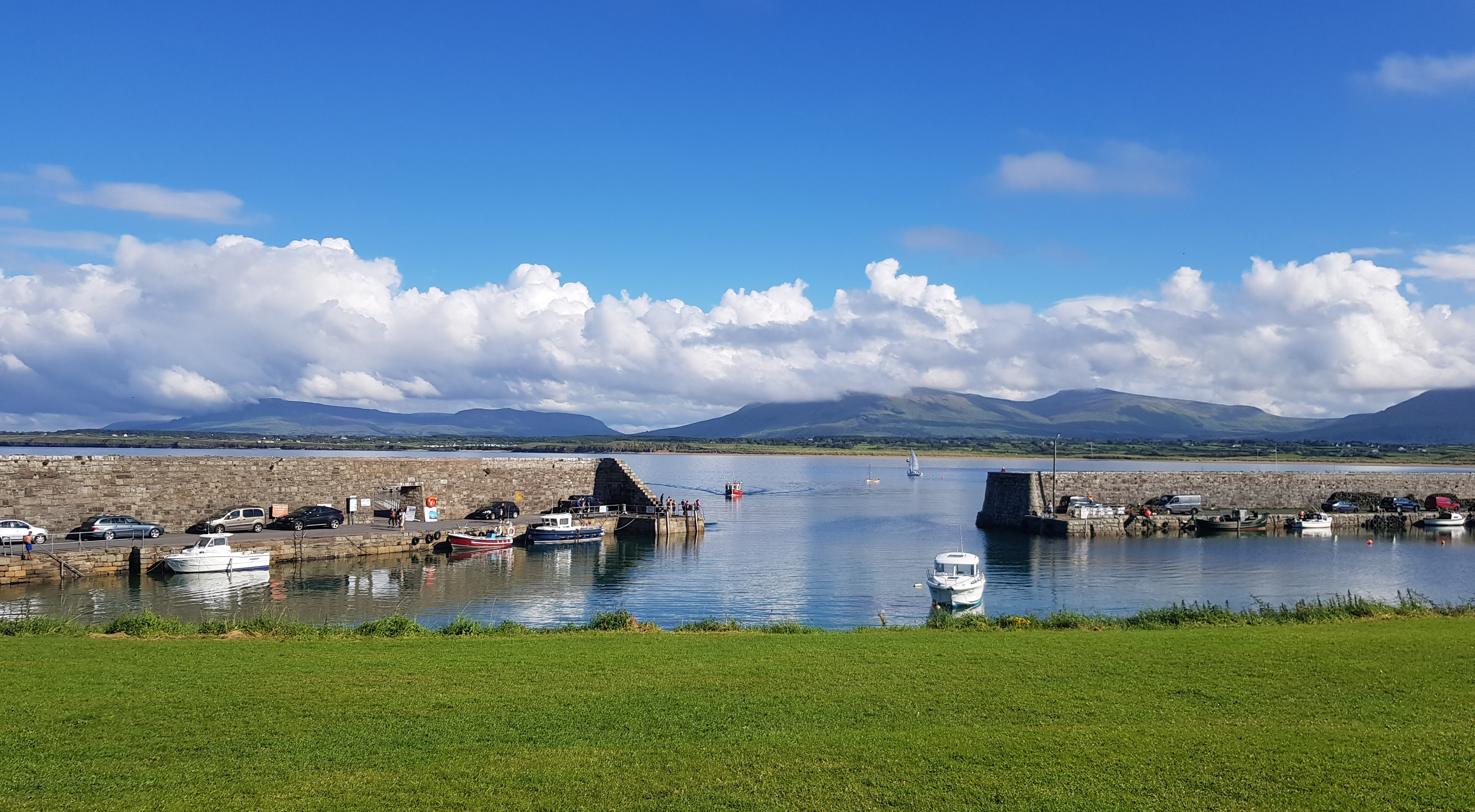
Mullaghmore Harbour

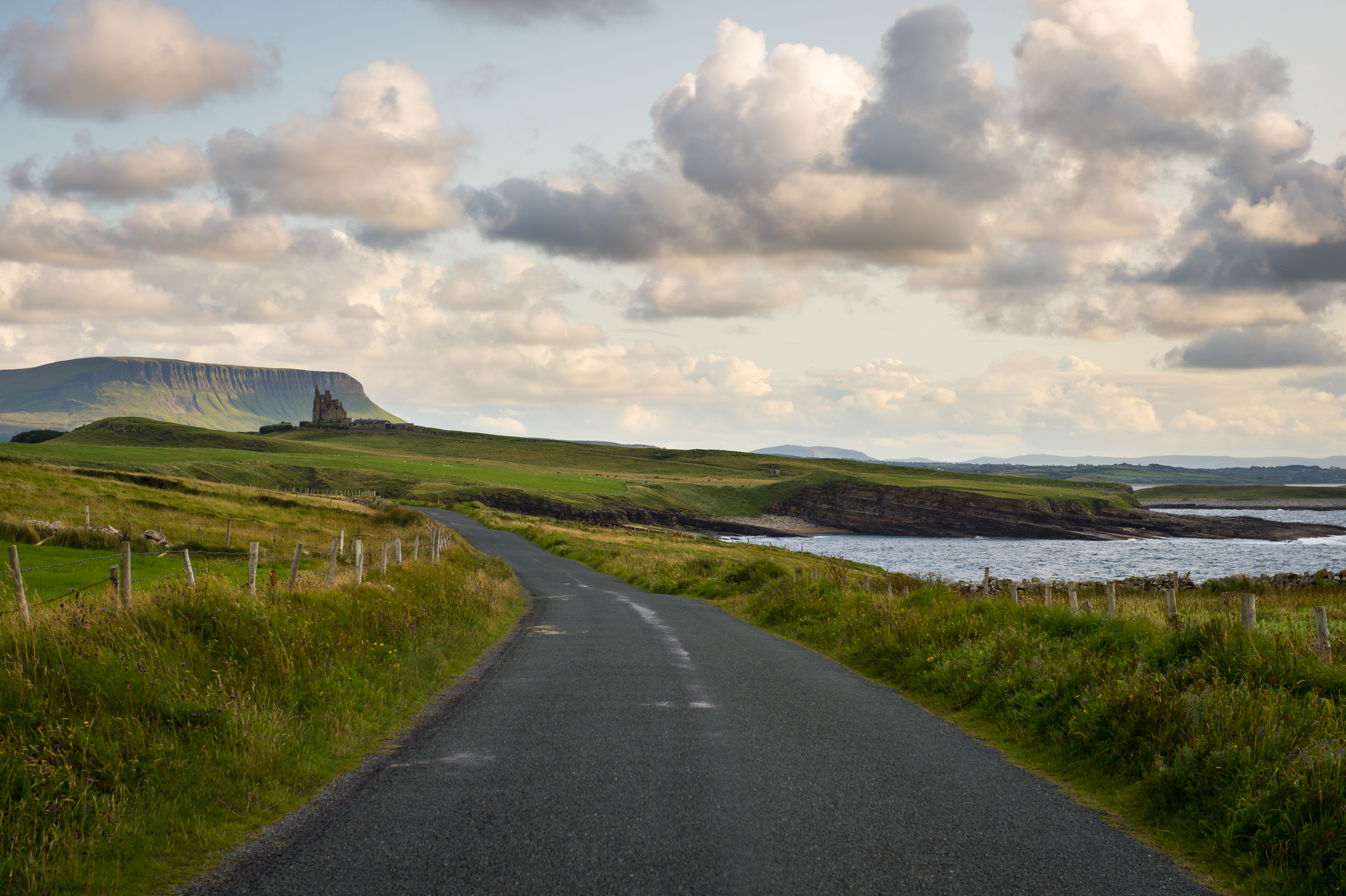
Mullaghmore Head

== See also ==
- Carbury, County Sligo
- Coastal landforms of Ireland
