= Ephraim MacDowel Cosgrave =

Ephraim McDowel Cosgrave (18 July 1853 – 17 February 1925) was an eminent Irish physician, antiquary and writer.

== Biography ==
He was born in Dublin, Ireland, son of William Alexander Cosgrave and Anna Maria, daughter of Dr. Ephraim McDowell.

He studied in Dublin at Trinity College, the House of Industry and the Rotunda Hospital, taking degrees in chemistry in 1870 and in medicine in 1878. He became a member of the Royal College of Physicians of Ireland in 1880 and was president in 1914. He was physician to Simpson's Hospital, Cork St. Fever Hospital and Drumcondra Hospital in Dublin.

He was Professor of Biology in the Royal College of Surgeons and a knight of the Order of St. John of Jerusalem.

He was one of the principal founders of the Georgian Society, where he acted as honorary secretary. He was also a member of the Royal Society of Antiquaries of Ireland. He was a recognized authority on old Dublin.

He was president of the Amateur Photographic Society and of the Irish Chess Club, indulging in two of his favourite hobbies.

In 1884 he married Anna, daughter of the Rev. Crofts-Bullen, of Ballythomas, Mallow, County Cork, County Cork. He died at his home in Gardiner Row, Dublin.

== Works ==
- The Student's Botany (1885)
- Official Handbook of the St. John Ambulance Association
- Illustrated Dictionary of Dublin (Sealy, Bryers and Walker, 1895).
- A Contribution Towards a Catalogue of Nineteenth Century Engravings of Dublin: Part 1 (Royal Society of Antiquaries of Ireland, 1906)
- The dictionary of Dublin : being a comprehensive guide to the City and its neighbourhood, by E. MacDowel Cosgrave and Leonard R. Strangways. (Sealy, Bryers and Walker, 1907).
- Dublin and County Dublin in the Twentieth Century : Contemporary biographies (W.T. Pike and Co, 1908)
- Dublin : alphabetical guide to the city and neighbourhood, by E. MacDowel Cosgrave and Leonard R. Strangways (Sealy, Bryers and Walker, 1914).

229p. : ill., map ; 19cm.

== References and sources ==
Notes

Sources

- Kirkpatrick, T P (1912). History of Medical Teaching in Trinity College Dublin and of the School of Physic In Ireland. Dublin: Neal.
- Fleetwood, John F (1983). The History of Medicine in Ireland. Dublin: Skellig Press.
