= St. Philip and St. James Church, Booterstown =

St. Philips and St. James
- St. Philips and St. James, Booterstown
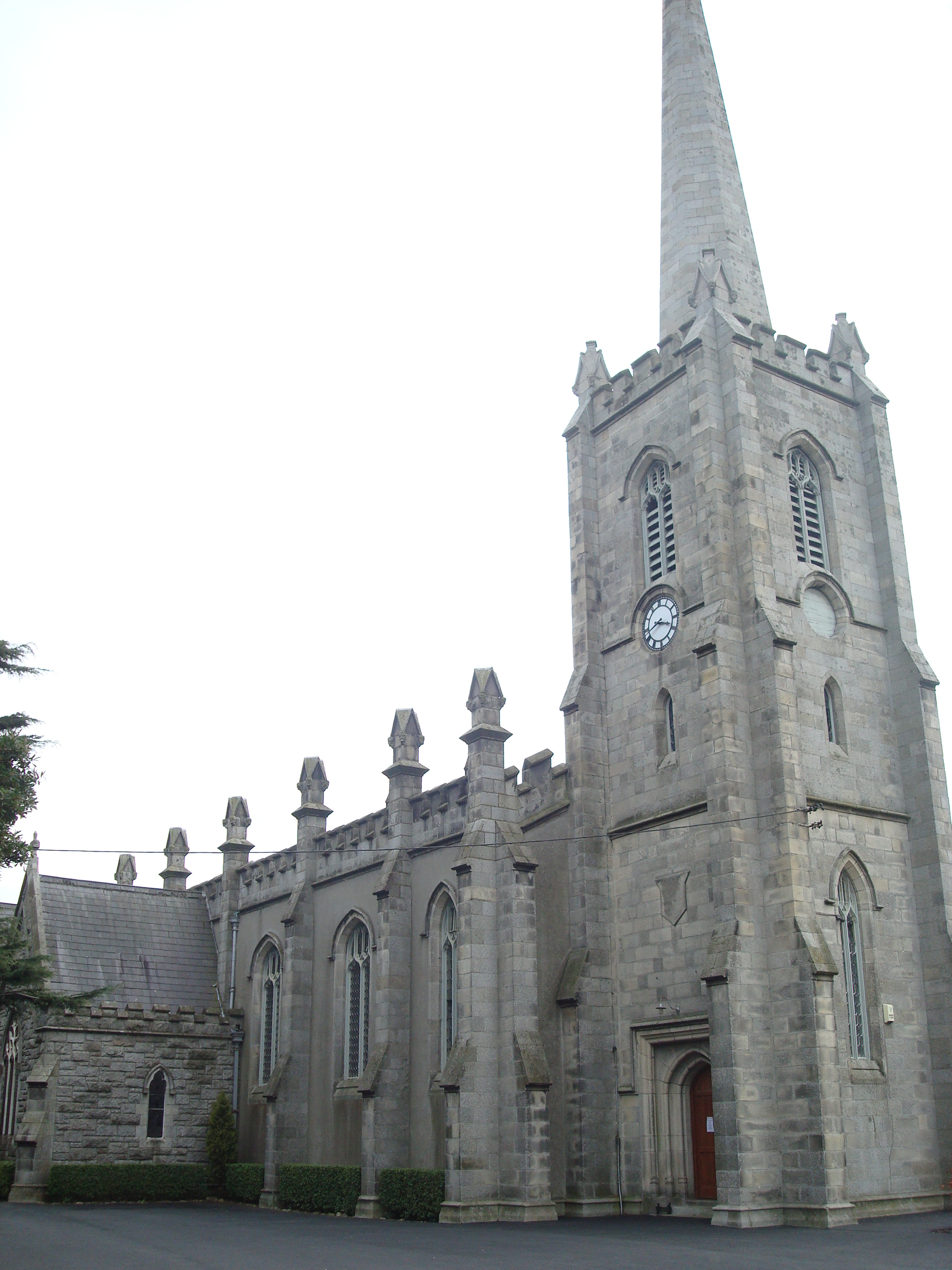
- St. Philips and St. James
- 53.300996°N 6.191237°W
- Location: Cross Avenue; Booterstown; County Dublin
- Country: Ireland
- Denomination: Anglicanism
- Website: booterstown.dublin.anglican.org

History
- Founded: 1821
- Consecrated: 16 May 1824

Architecture
- Architect(s): John Bowden; Joseph Welland
- Architectural type: Church
- Style: Gothic Revival

Specifications
- Capacity: 500

Administration
- Diocese: Dublin and Glendalough
- Parish: Booterstown

St. Philip and St. James Church, Booterstown is a church of the Church of Ireland located in Booterstown, Dublin.

== History ==
=== Beginning the Parish ===
The area of the parish of Booterstown was founded in 1821, where the area had previously been covered by the parish of Donnybrook.

=== Initial building ===
The site of the church was given by George Augustus Herbert, 11th Earl of Pembroke along with £1,000 towards the construction. A grant by the Board of First Fruits and money raised locally went towards the total cost of £4,016 17s. The church was built between 1821 and 1824 with designs by John Bowden and finished after Bowden's death in 1822, by his student Joseph Welland.

The church was consecrated on Sunday 16 May 1824 by Archbishop Dr. William Magee, Church of Ireland Archbishop of Dublin.

The initial structure was described as "handsome, in the later English style, with a square embattled tower with crocketed pinnacles at the angles, and surmounted by a lofty spire; the walls are strengthened with buttresses terminating in pinnacles, and crowned with an embattled parapet."

=== Extension ===
In 1854 Sidney Herbert, 1st Baron Herbert of Lea added a new entrance to the grounds from Mount Merrion.

In early 1868 under the incumbency of Rev. Beaver Henry Blacker, the parish decided to extend the church with a transept (on the south side) opening by two arches into the nave, a chancel, robing-room and porch. The architect for these alterations was J. Rawson Carroll and the building contractors were Messrs. D. Crowe and Sons. The church was reopened on 2 May 1869.

In 1875 further enhancements were made by Rev. John Lombard with the addition of a second transept (on the north side) and organ chamber containing the present organ built by Forster and Andrews of Hull. Also in 1888 the addition of a pulpit.

Future Bishop of Killaloe Dr. Sterling Berry served from 1892 to 1913 as Canon in the church prior to elevation to the Bishopric.

== Other buildings ==
The Booterstown National School is located on the grounds of the church. The first schoolhouse was built on the grounds in 1826. In the mid-1950s the old school was replaced with the current school and officially opened by Éamon de Valera.

On the site of the church, there is a Parish Centre, the Barrett Cheshire Home and the Rectory.

== Organ ==
The organ of St. Philip and St. James was built by Forster and Andrews of Hull in 1876 at a cost of £450. It has two manuals and twenty stops. Its stop-list was almost identical, those of the organs in St. Paul's Glenageary and St. Patrick's Dalkey (also built by Forster and Andrews) prior to the latter two instruments' rebuilds. The organ was restored in the mid-20th Century during which time one new stop was added and an electric blower added.

== Gallery ==
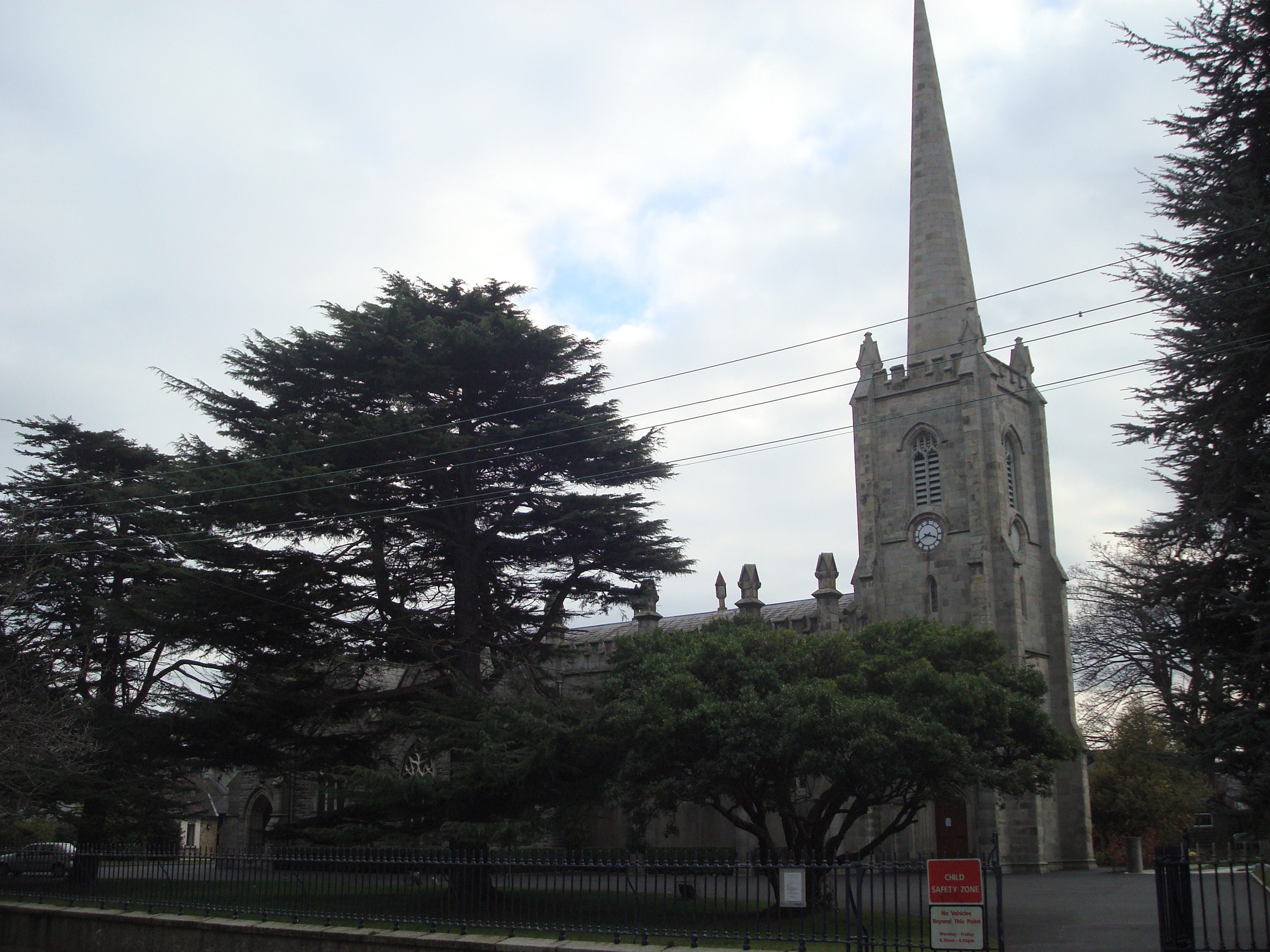
The church viewed from Cross Avenue

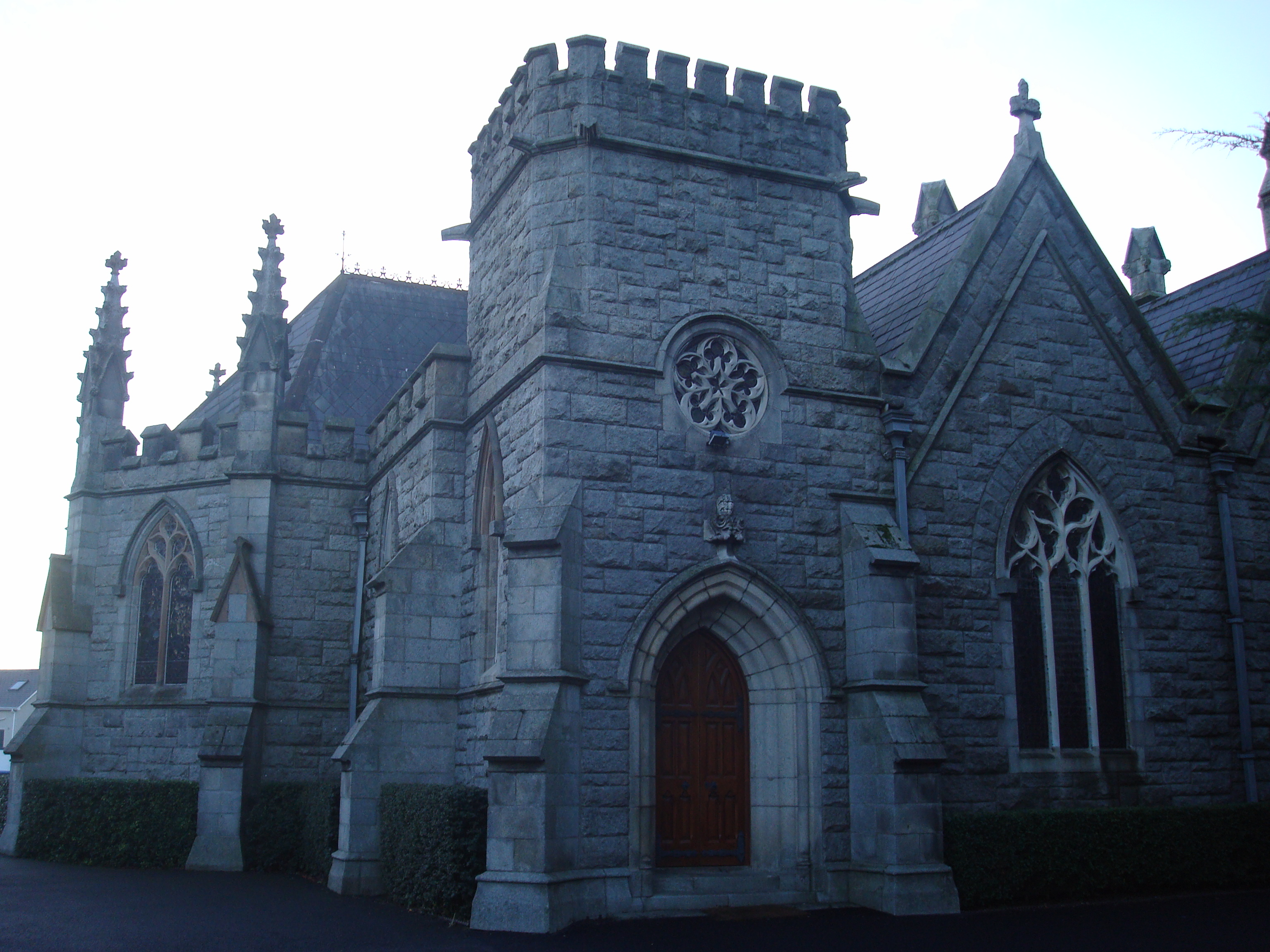
Rear North

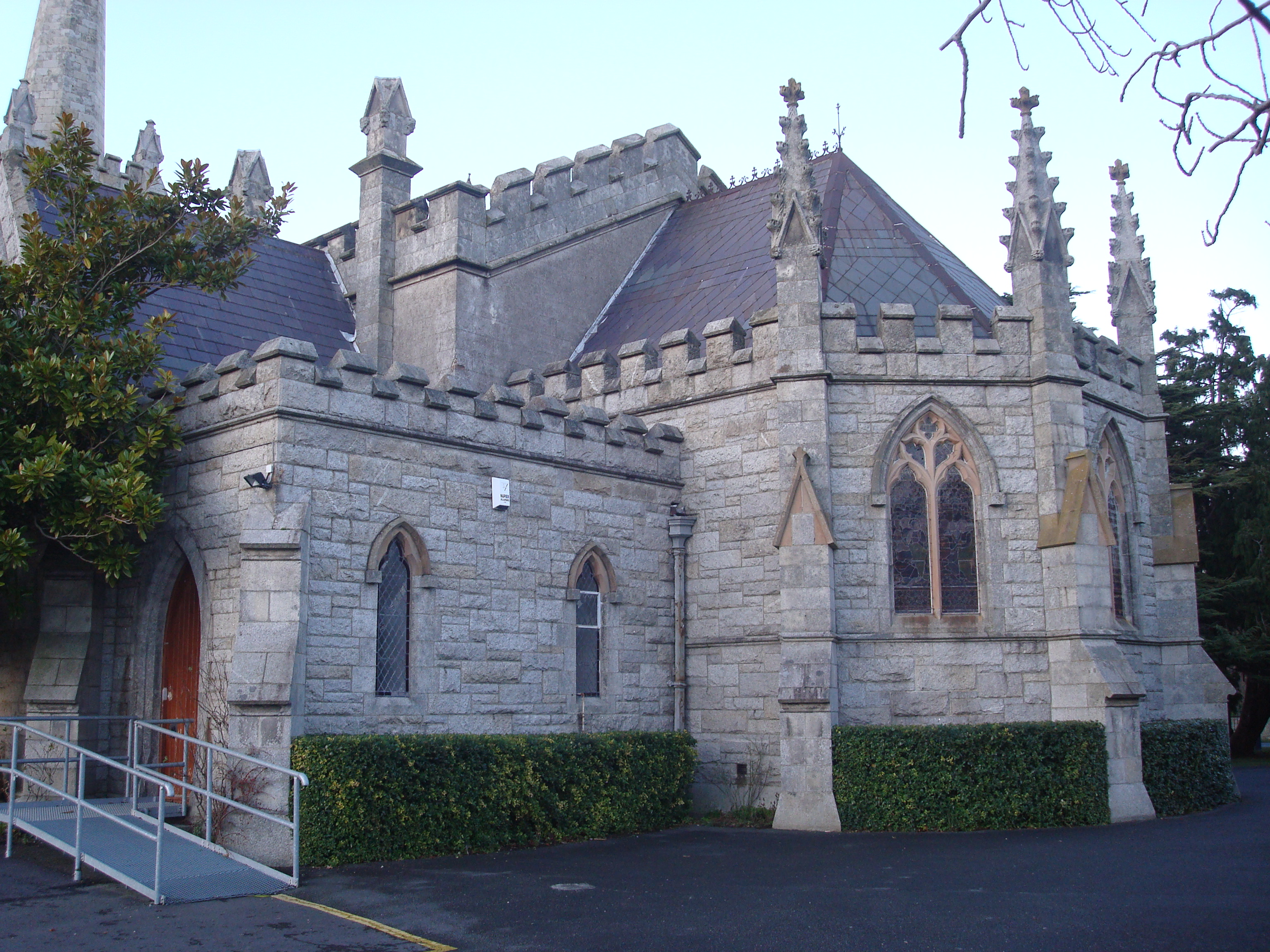
Rear South
