= Drumcondra Hospital =

Former hospital in Dublin, Ireland

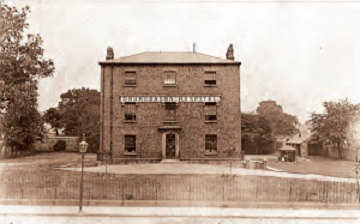
- Drumcondra Hospital

- Shown in Dublin

Geography
- Location: Dublin, Ireland
- Coordinates: 53°21′47.71″N 6°15′52.89″W

Organisation
- Type: General hospital

History
- Founded: 1818
- Closed: 1986

Drumcondra Hospital (Irish: Ospidéal Dhroim Conrach) was a voluntary hospital on Whitworth Road in Dublin, Ireland. It became an annex to the Rotunda Hospital in 1970.

== History ==
A dispensary was provided at Cole's Lane off Henry Street, to serve the poor of parishes on the north side of Dublin at the time of the founding of the parish of St. George in 1793. This proved insufficient for the increasing number of cases. A few years later, shortly after the establishment of the Cork Street Fever Hospital on the south side of Dublin, an infirmary, St. George's Fever Hospital, was opened in Lower Dorset Street.

A new site was acquired on Whitworth Road that had originally been acquired in the 18th century for the new church of St. George, which was eventually built on Temple Street. It was intended to have a hospital on the north side of the city to complement the Cork Street Hospital on the south side. A period of great distress and epidemic, due to poverty among other things in those days, showed the advantages of such a hospital. The new hospital, which was built alongside the north banks of the Royal Canal and named after the Charles Whitworth, 1st Earl Whitworth, Lord Lieutenant of Ireland, opened as the Whitworth Fever Hospital in May 1818.

The hospital was administered by a board of fifteen prominent Dublin gentlemen, presided over by the Duke of Leinster. The early staff included the physicians Robert J. Graves and Robert Adams. The hospital was first open only to poor patients who were unable to pay for medical attendance or proper treatment in their own homes. It depended on support on voluntary subscriptions, as no grant from the government or other public funds were available. In 1834 a small number of paying wards were set up. At the time of the Irish Famine in the late 1840s, fever epidemics carried off victims by the hundred. The hospital quickly filled up, and fever sheds were erected along the canal bank for those for whom there was no space in the hospital.

In 1852 the hospital ran out of money and was closed. It was taken over shortly afterwards by doctors dealing in deformities and re-opened as the Whitworth General Hospital in 1860. In 1893 it came under the patronage of the Drumcondra Town Commissioners, and the name was changed (in order to avoid confusion with the Whitworth Hospital at Grangegorman) to the Drumcondra Hospital.

The architect James Rawson Carroll added of outermost blocks to the hospital circa 1900.

Money was raised from fetes, concerts, bazaars (the "Drum bazaar") and musical events. In the early 20th century staff included Ephraim MacDowel Cosgrave who became a Professor of Biology. At outbreak of the First World War a small number of beds were set aside for wounded soldiers. The hospital became an annexe of the Rotunda Hospital in the 1970 and the building was sold to the National Council for the Blind of Ireland in 1986.
