= Cork Street Fever Hospital, Dublin =

Former hospital in Dublin, Ireland

Cork Street Fever Hospital
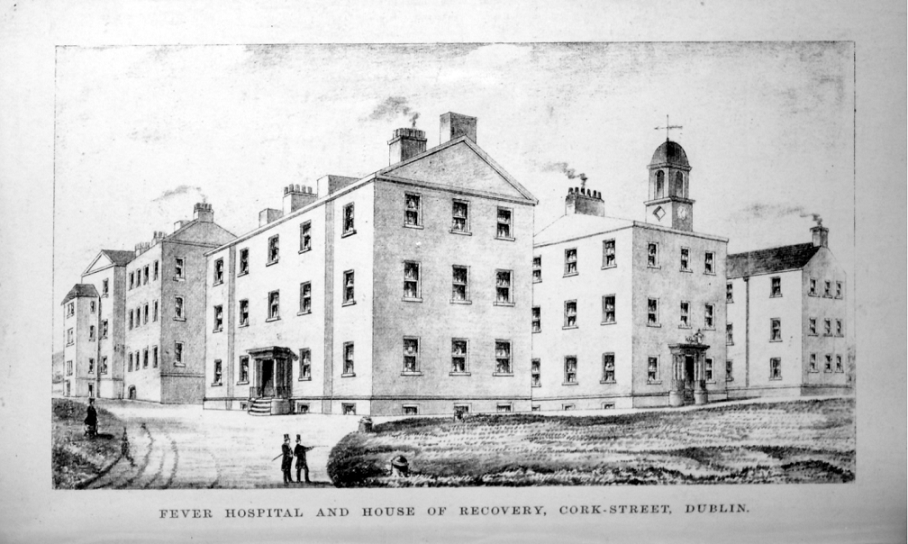
- Cork Street Fever Hospital

- Shown in Dublin

Geography
- Location: Dublin, Ireland
- Coordinates: 53°20′20″N 6°16′37″W

Organisation
- Type: Specialist

Services
- Speciality: Fever hospital

History
- Founded: 1804
- Closed: 1953

The Cork Street Fever Hospital (Irish: Ospidéal Fiabhrais Shráid Chorcaí), also known as the House of Recovery, was a hospital located in Cork Street in Dublin, Ireland.

== History ==
The original hospital, which was located in a poor densely populated part of the Liberties but with large grounds, was designed by Samuel Johnston and built by Henry, Mullins & McMahon. It consisted of two parallel brick buildings, 80 by 30 feet (24.4 by 9.1 m), three stories high, connected by a colonnade of 116 feet (35 m). The eastern range was used for fever, the western for convalescent patients, in order to keep the patients separated. It opened on 14 May 1804. The objectives of the hospital were to care for the diseased in the neighbourhood and prevent the spread of infection in the homes of the poor.

An additional building, much larger than any of the former, was added in 1814, by which the hospital was rendered capable of containing 240 beds.

The hospital initially accepted fever patients from five parishes in the Liberties. A year after its foundation the catchment area was extended to the district south of the River Liffey as far as the South Circular Road. By 1810 this was extended to the whole of the city of Dublin, and to all classes of applicants, which increased the financial pressure on the hospital. In the year 1812 over 2,200 patients were admitted. The hospital did succeed in checking the spread of disease, but the worsening unemployment in the Liberties following the Act of Union and occasional epidemics, such as Scarlet fever, pushed up the mortality rate for the first few years of its existence. However, by 1815 the mortality rate in the hospital had declined to 1 in 20 (from 1 in 11 in 1804).

Dublin had six typhus epidemics in the 18th century – it was not at the time known that typhus was caused by a louse-born organism, which flourished in unhygienic conditions. The hospital was extended between 1817 and 1819 to help cope with a national epidemic. Three thousand cases were admitted to the hospital in one month in 1818.

Another typhus epidemic hit Dublin in 1826. In the hospital, 10,000 people were treated for the infection. It was so overcrowded that tents were erected in the grounds (fortunately, over 4 acres (1.6 ha) acres in extent), and these provided 400 extra beds. In 1832 Dublin was ravaged by a cholera epidemic. Despite the best efforts of all concerned, thousands of victims died and were hastily buried in nearby Bully's Acre.

Typhus came again at the time of the Irish Famine in the late 1840s. During 1847 nearly 12,000 cases applied during a period of about ten months, although "amongst the poor at their own houses, .. vast numbers remained there, who either could not be accommodated in hospital, or who never thought of applying". Typhus returned in the 1880s, when Gerard Manley Hopkins died of the disease in Dublin.

In 1903 the James Weir Home for Nurses was erected on the opposite side of the street to provide accommodation for up to 50 fever nurses working at the Fever Hospital.

After services were transferred to the Cherry Orchard Hospital in Ballyfermot, the old Cork Street Fever Hospital closed in November 1953. The old hospital was renamed Brú Chaoimhín and converted into a nursing home.

== Notable physicians ==
Notable physicians included:

- Ephraim MacDowel Cosgrave, an eminent physician from County Longford.
- Patrick Harkan, of Raheen, County Roscommon, a physician who arrived from the Meath Hospital around 1820 and remained in Cork Street for 40 years.
- Christopher J McSweeney, Medical Superintendent from 1934 to 1953

== Notable patients ==
James Whitelaw, the historian and statistician, who was also rector of St. Catherine's, contracted a fever while ministering to the poor in the hospital and died there in February 1813.

== Archives ==
The Royal College of Physicians of Ireland holds the archive of Cork Street Fever Hospital. Records in this collection range in date from 1801 to 2005, spanning the entire existence of Cork Street Fever Hospital (1801-1953) and over five decades of its successor institution, the Cherry Orchard Hospital.

== Sources ==
- Bennett, Douglas (1994). Encyclopedia of Dublin. Dublin: Gill and MacMillan. ISBN 0-7171-2292-1.
- Dalton, John (1838). History of the County Dublin. Dublin: Hodges and Smith.
- O'Rourke, John (1874). The History of the Great Irish Famine Of 1847. Dublin. ISBN 978-1426479915.
- Lewis, Samuel (1835). Topography of Ireland. Dublin.
