= Royal Hospital, Donnybrook =

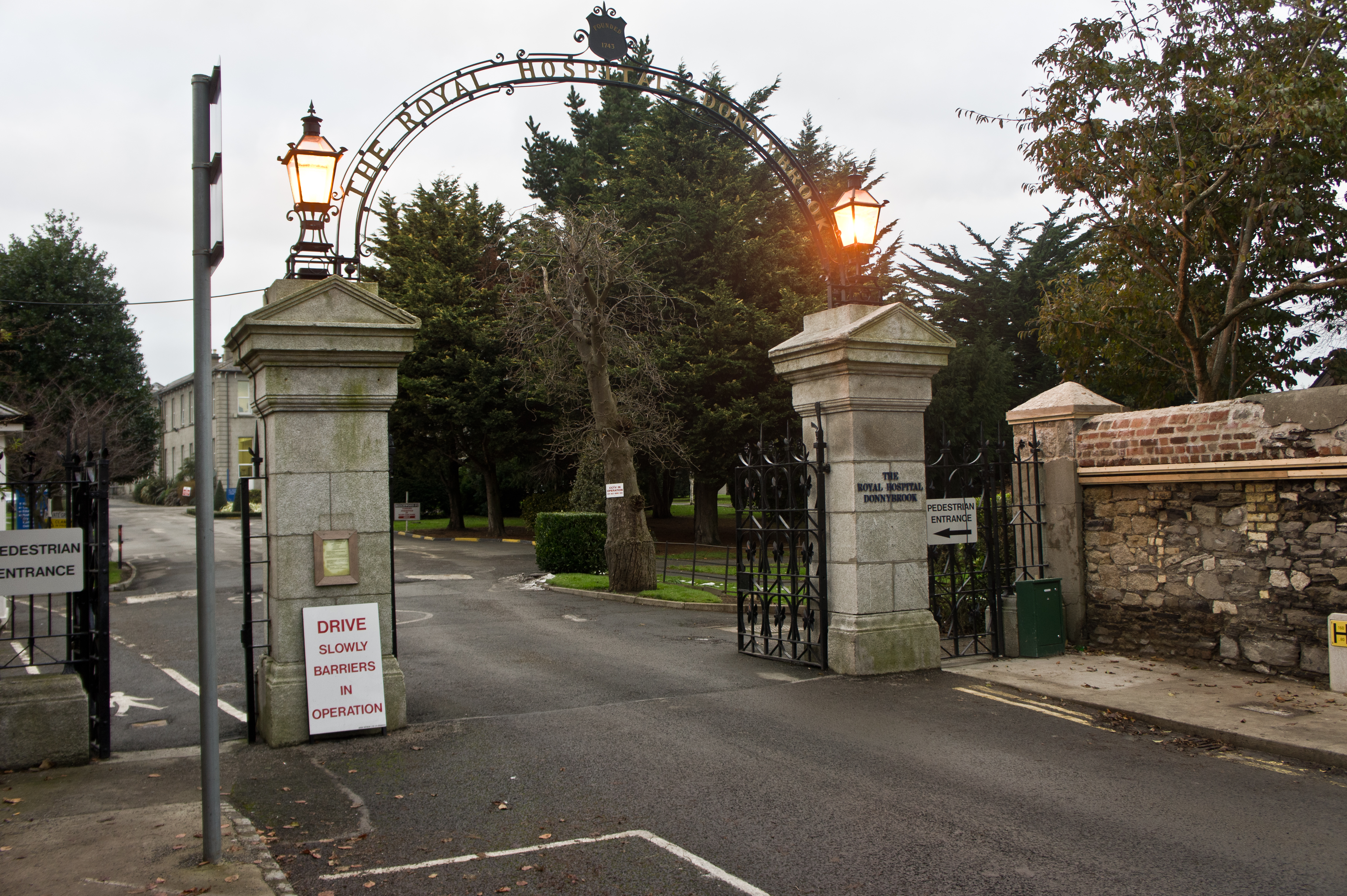
- Entrance to the Royal Hospital, Donnybrook

- Shown in Dublin

Geography
- Location: Donnybrook, Dublin, Ireland
- Coordinates: 53°19′30″N 06°14′55″W

Organisation
- Type: Specialist

Services
- Speciality: Rehabilitation

History
- Founded: 1743

Links
- Website: rhd.ie
- Lists: Hospitals in the Republic of Ireland

The Royal Hospital, Donnybrook (Irish: Ospidéal Ríoga, Domhnach Broc) is a hospital in Donnybrook, Dublin, Ireland, founded in 1743. It was originally set up as a "hospital for incurables" to provide sufferers with food, shelter and relief from their distressing conditions.

== History ==
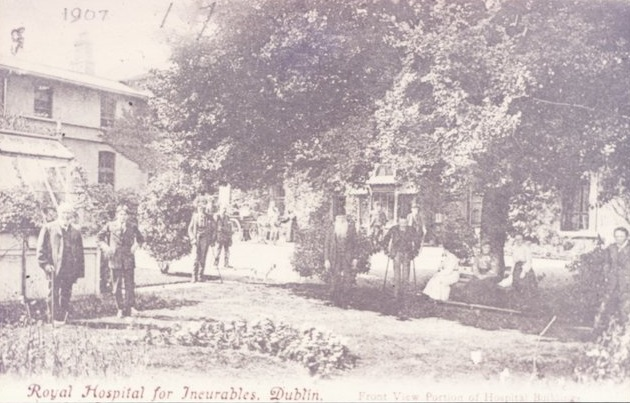
The Royal Hospital in 1907

In Georgian Dublin there were a number of charitable music societies that raised money to alleviate the suffering of the poor and ill. There was no system of public welfare, nor, until much later, any general policy on the part of the government to alleviate the problem of poverty, which pervaded the city at that time. One of these societies was the Dublin Charitable Musical Society of Crow Street, the leading light of which was Richard Wesley, 1st Baron Mornington, a politician (MP for Trim 1729-1746) and amateur violinist who took part in charity concerts.

=== Fleet Street ===
The society decided in 1743 to donate their funds to set up and support a hospital for incurables. A house for this purpose was rented in Fleet Street, fitted up, and opened, with a nurse, a staff of doctors and surgeons, and 23 patients as the "Hospital for Incurables, Dublin" on 23 May 1744. In the early years of the hospital, the doctors included Francis Le Hunte (from County Wexford, a founder-member of the Royal Dublin Society).

=== Townsend Street ===
The hospital moved to Townsend Street in 1753. An illustration of this hospital features in the Dublin magazine in April 1762.

=== Donnybrook (1793) ===
In 1793 the hospital exchanged location with the Lock Hospital, which suited both hospitals and moved to Donnybrook, a suburb of the city.

It was remodelled by James Rawson Carroll between 1887 and 1894 and also received a Royal Charter and became the "Royal Hospital for Incurables, Dublin" in 1887.

In the 1980s it started to specialise in rehabilitation for the elderly and services for young disabled adults and, at that time, was renamed the "Royal Hospital, Donnybrook".
