= Richmond Surgical Hospital =

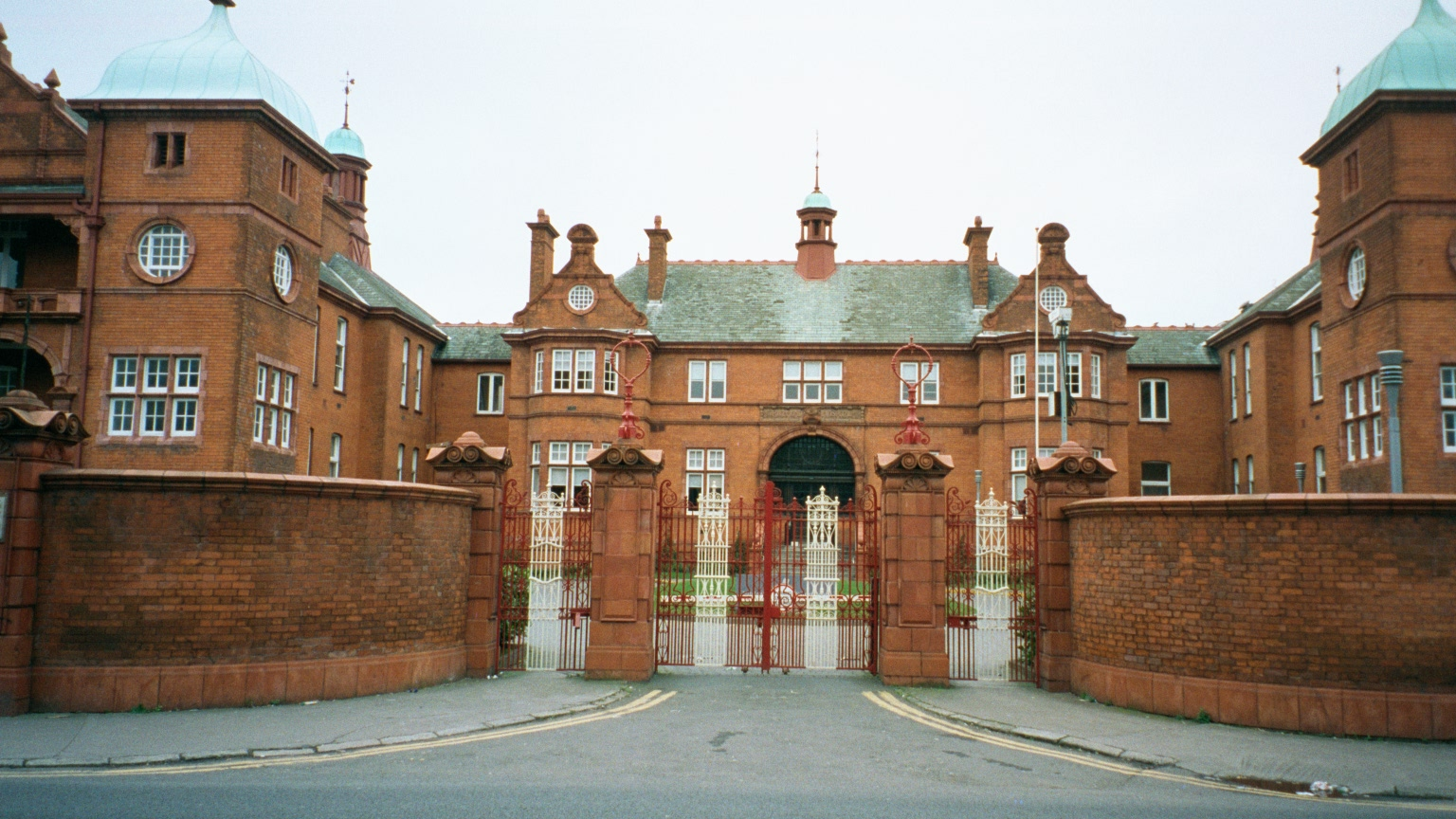
- Entrance to the Richmond Surgical Hospital

- Shown in Dublin

Geography
- Location: North Brunswick Street, Dublin, Ireland
- Coordinates: 53.3511°N 6.2786°W

Organisation
- Type: General hospital

History
- Founded: 1810
- Closed: 1987

The Richmond Surgical Hospital (Irish: Ospidéal Máinliachta Richmond) was a general hospital in Grangegorman, Dublin, Ireland.

== History ==
The building has its origins in a convent originally constructed by some Benedictine nuns on the site around 1688. A later Georgian building was altered to became part of the House of Industry who commissioned a hospital to care for the 'ruptured poor'; it opened in 1810.

The hospital was completely rebuilt to a design by Carroll & Batchelor in the English Renaissance style in red brick and terracotta tiles and was officially opened by The 5th Earl Cadogan, Lord Lieutenant of Ireland, in April 1901. After services transferred to the Beaumont Hospital, the Richmond Surgical Hospital closed in 1987.

In the early 1990s the building was acquired by businessman Rory O'Meara who, in 1996, converted it into a courthouse. Then in 2013 it was acquired by the Irish Nurses and Midwives Organisation (INMO) which, in 2018, converted it into an education and event centre.
