= Richard Barter =

Richard Barter may refer to:

- Richard Barter (physician) (1802–1870), Irish physician and proponent of hydropathy
- Richard H. Barter (1833–1859), Canadian-born outlaw during the California Gold Rush
- Richard Barter (sculptor and architect) (c.1824–1896), Irish sculptor, architect and innovative designer of Victorian Turkish baths
