= Sweny's Pharmacy =

Former pharmacy in Dublin, Ireland with literary connections

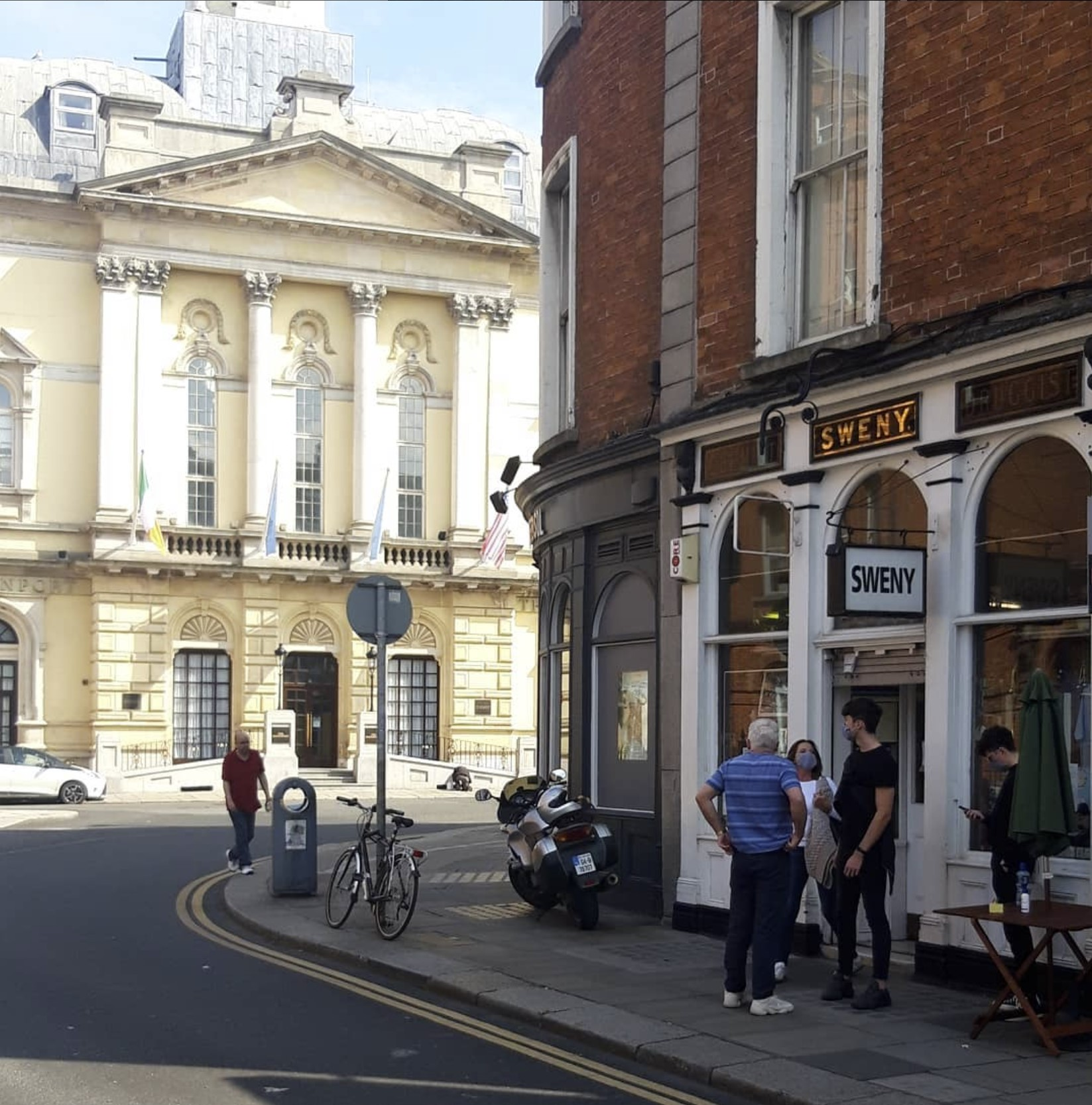
- Sweny's Pharmacy on Bloomsday, 2020 (with the Davenport Hotel in the background)

General information
- Type: Shop
- Architectural style: Victorian
- Location: 1 Lincoln Place; Dublin 2 D02 VP65
- Coordinates: 53.34188°N 6.25056°W
- Inaugurated: 1847

Sweny's Pharmacy, or F. W. Sweny & Co. Ltd. is a former Victorian era pharmacy, now a new and used book store, a Joycean cultural centre, hosting daily group readings of Joyce's work and supporting new aspiring writers, in Dublin, Ireland most notable for appearing in James Joyce's 1922 novel Ulysses. The pharmacy is one of many Joycean landmarks scattered throughout Dublin, and has become a literary tourist attraction, particularly on Bloomsday (16 June) when fans of Joyce visit the premises to celebrate the book.

== History ==
Built in 1847 as a GP's consulting room, the building was later adapted to include an apothecary; it eventually opened as a 'dispensing chemist' named "F.W. Sweny and Co (Limited)" in 1853 when pharmacist Frederick William Sweny took over. The Sweny family who operated the pharmacy also lived in the house to which it is attached. The National Inventory of Architectural Heritage notes that a "Mark Sweny, M.D., general medical practitioner and accoucheur" operated from the site as of 1862.

In the nineteenth century, Lincoln Place was also the site of Victorian Turkish baths and a number of medical facilities (including an ophthalmic hospital) and later the Dublin Dental University Hospital. Sweny's chemist and apothecary would have served supplies, including soap, to those who used these services.

As of the 1990s, Sweny's was mentioned in a Dublin Tourism brochure as being still fitted out as it was in 1904, the year in which Ulysses was set.

President of France Emmanuel Macron visited Sweny's in August 2021.

As of February 2022, PJ Murphy was reportedly running Sweny's.

In November 2025, the Dublin InQuirer noted the existence of an illuminated digital billboard on Lincoln Place, questioning the appropriateness of such billboards in the city centre.

== Ulysses ==
In the book, the character of Leopold Bloom buys a bar of lemon soap while waiting for a prescription. Lemon soap can still be bought in the shop as a souvenir.

== Gallery ==
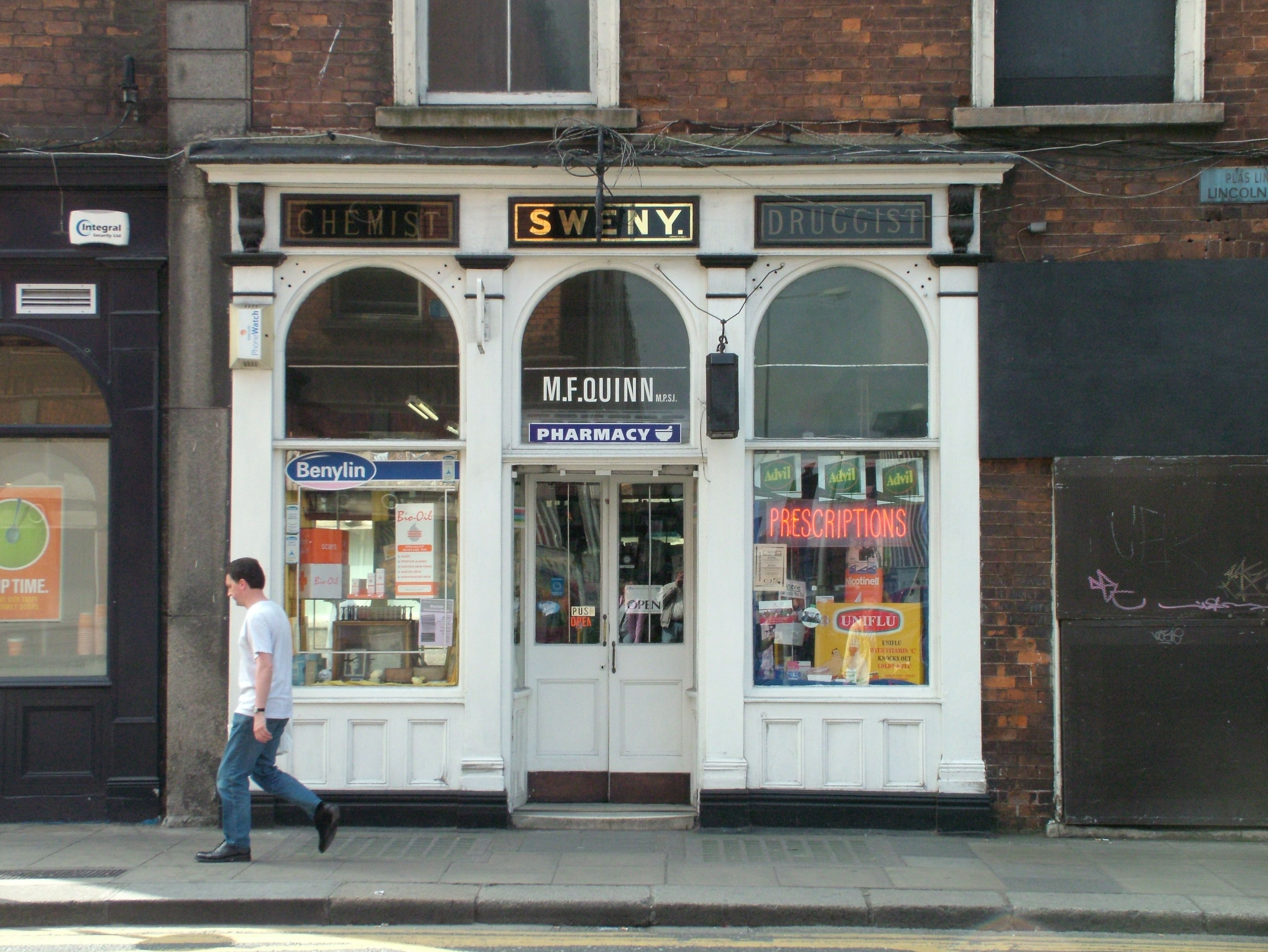
The exterior in 2007

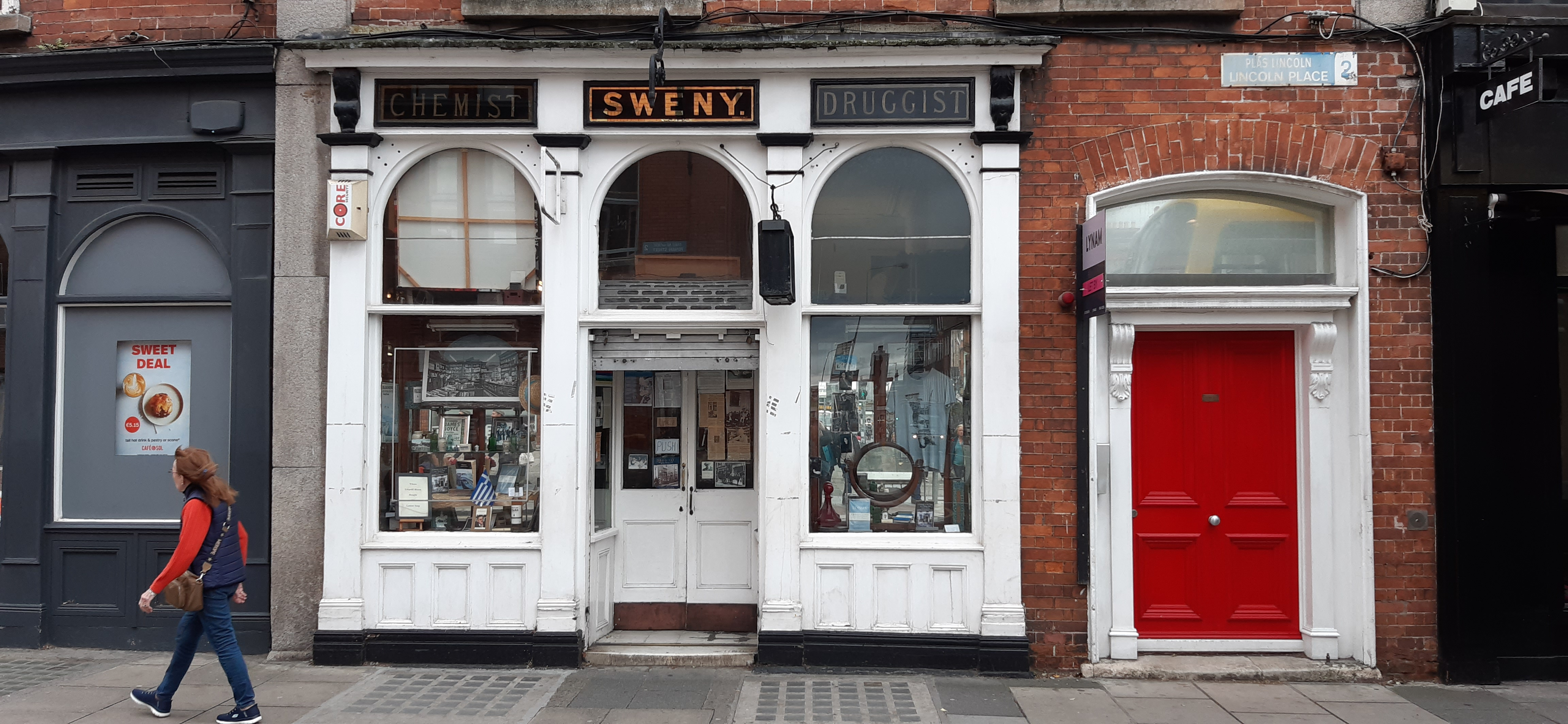
The exterior in 2023

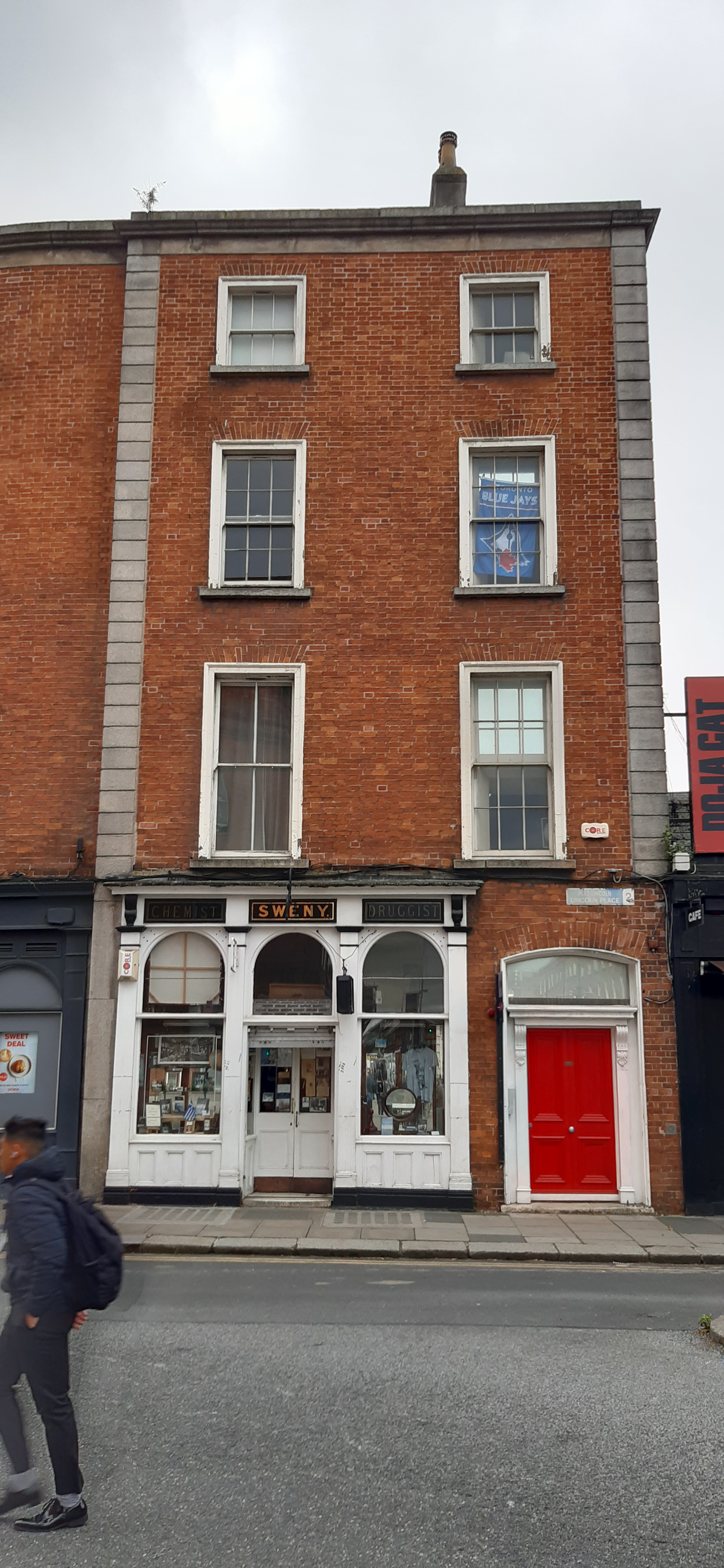
Full length view of building from Lincoln Place

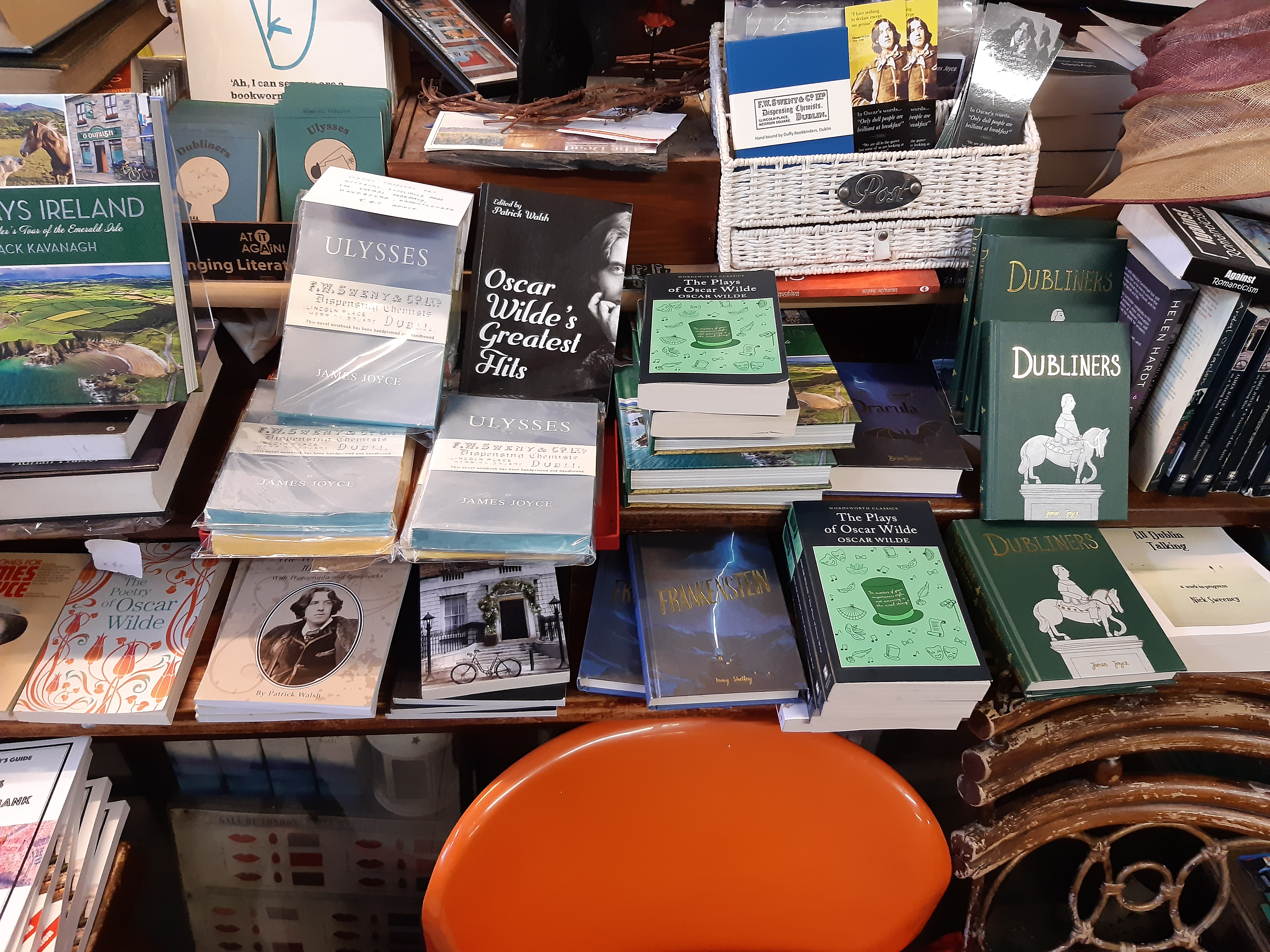
Joycean and other Irish literature on sale

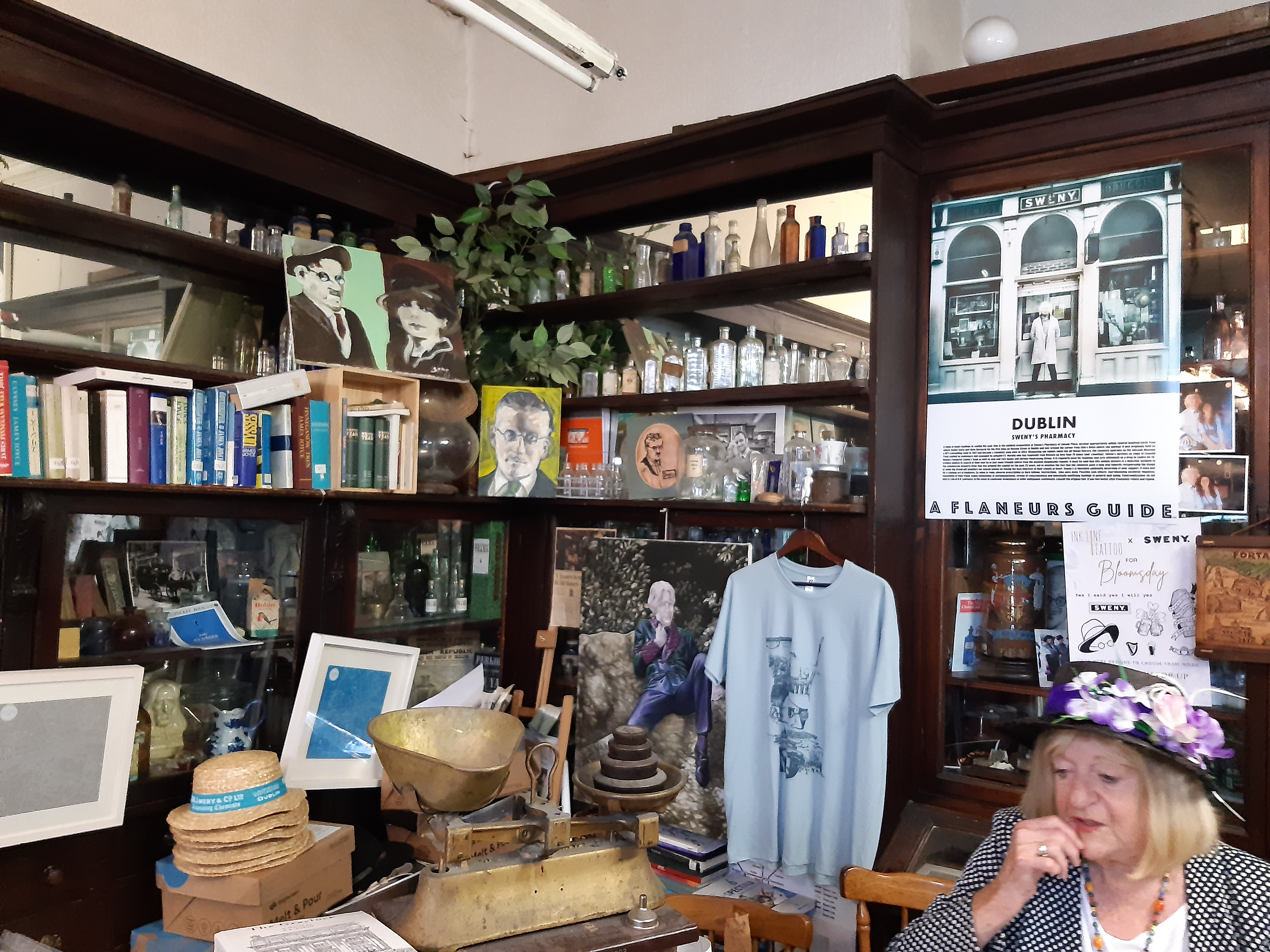
View of the interior

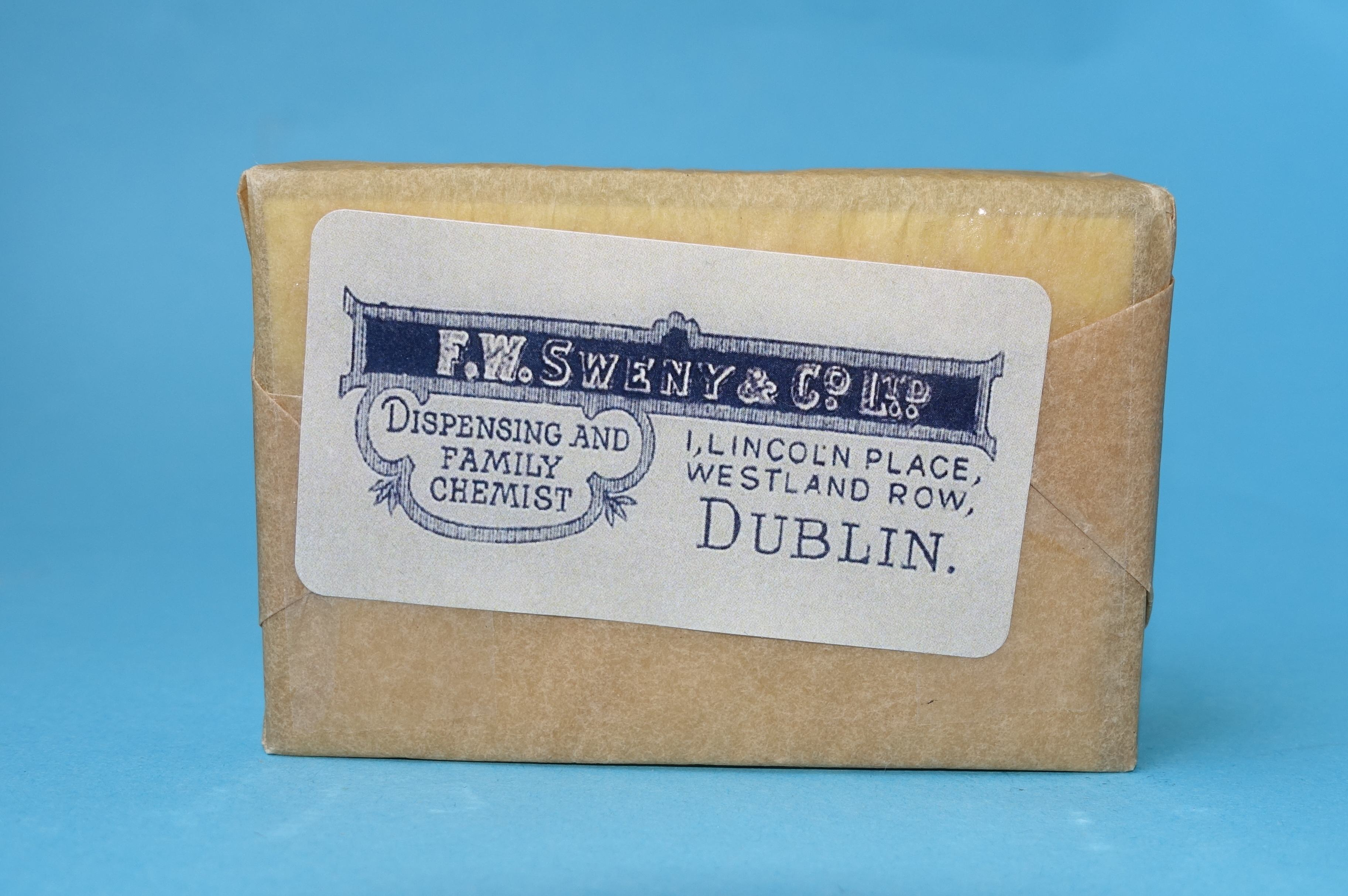
Sweny's lemon soap

== See also ==
- Turkish Baths, Lincoln Place, a nearby establishment which also appeared in Ulysses (demolished in 1970)
- Merrion Hall
- Oriel House, Westland Row
