= Arnold Francis Hendy =

Anglo-Irish architect

Arnold Francis Hendy (1894 – 1958) was an architect.

== Early life and education ==
He was born in Ayrshire in 1894.

== World War I ==
He served with the Devonshire Regiment in Palestine and France.

== Architectural career ==
He entered the offices of W.H.Byrne & Son and became a student of the Royal Institute of the Architects of Ireland for two years, winning the Downes Bronze Medal for 1920-1921 and the Institute Prize for 1921-1922.

In 1924 he became an assistant at the office of Kaye-Parry & Ross. George Murray Ross died in 1927 and William Kaye-Parry in 1932.

Hendy carried on the practice under the same name until his death in March 1956.

His works include the Pembroke Carnegie Free Library in Ballsbridge, No.35-36 Westmoreland Street and Archer's Garage.
