= Lincoln Place, Dublin =

Street in Dublin, Ireland

Lincoln Place
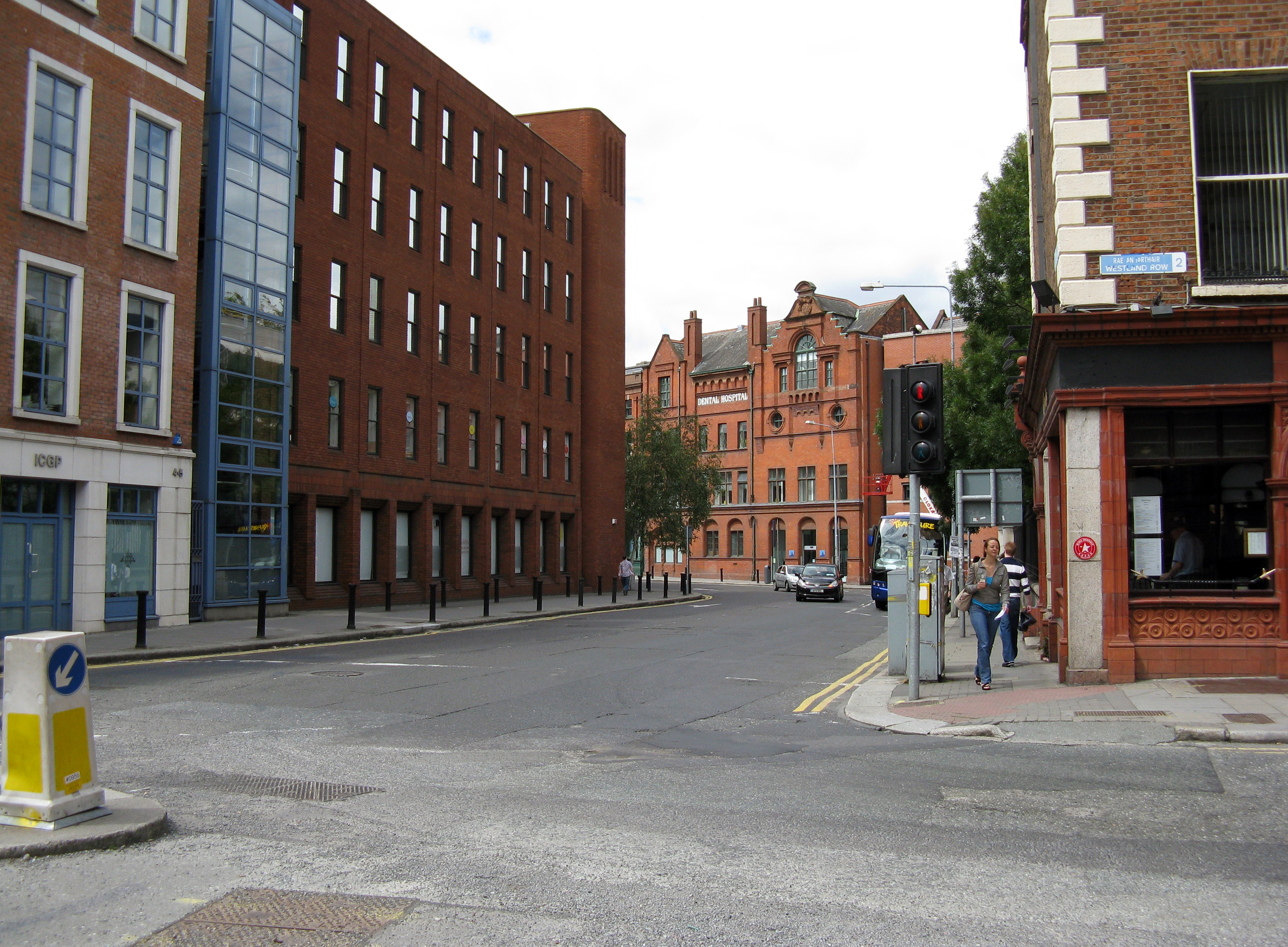
- Lincoln Place as seen from Westland Row

- Location within Central Dublin
- Native name: Plás Lincoln (Irish)
- Former names: St Patrick's Well Lane; Park Street
- Type: Street
- Length: 180 m (590 ft)
- Location: Dublin, Ireland
- Postal code: D02
- Coordinates: 53°20′32″N 6°15′05″W
- west end: Fenian Street, Merrion Street Lower, Westland Row
- east end: Leinster Street South

Other
- Known for: Dublin Dental University Hospital; Sweny's Pharmacy; Victorian Turkish Baths

Lincoln Place (Irish: Plás Lincoln) is a street in Dublin, Ireland.

== Location ==
Alongside Nassau Street and Leinster Street South, Lincoln Place runs along the southern boundary of Trinity College Dublin.

== History ==
Lincoln Place, Nassau Street and Leinster Street South were previously collectively known as St Patrick's Well Lane. The name was derived from the holy well on the ground of Trinity College.

In John Rocque's map of Dublin in the late 1750s, Lincoln Place was marked as an extension of St Patricks Lane. By 1773, the street was called Park Place, and Park Street in 1792, a reference to College Park and is still referred to as Park Street at the time of the first 6 inch Ordanance Survey maps of 1843.

A 1797 map refers to the street as Harcourt Place.

By at least 1849, the street was referred to as Lincoln Place with the street supposedly being renamed by Dublin Corporation as it was deemed to have a poor reputation. It is unlikely the street was initially renamed for Abraham Lincoln as the street's renaming preceded Lincoln's election as president by at least a decade. The street may have been named for Henry Pelham-Clinton, Earl of Lincoln, who was Chief Secretary of Ireland in 1846, although it may have been later officially renamed for the by-then more famous American. It may also have been a reference to Lincoln's Inn in London which would have been a common reference to Trinity College students in the legal profession.

The Park Street School of Medicine was founded at number 32 on the street from 1824. The site was later taken over by St. Mark's Ophthalmic Hospital for Diseases of the Eye and Ear from 1850. The hospital had earlier been founded on Mark Street by William Wilde in 1844. It was later amalgamated with the National Eye Hospital in 1895 and became the Royal Victoria Eye and Ear Hospital.

== Architecture ==
The street has a number of notable buildings, including the Dublin Dental University Hospital and Lincoln Chambers. Two of the street's buildings were mentioned in James Joyce's Ulysses: Sweny's Pharmacy and the Victorian Turkish Baths which were demolished in 1970. Merrion Hall terminates the vista from the south on Merrion Street Lower while Oriel House frames the corner of Lincoln Place, Westland Row and Merrion Street Lower.

== See also ==
- List of streets and squares in Dublin
