= Merrion Hall =

Building in County Dublin, Republic of Ireland

Coordinates: 53.34159°N 6.24982°W

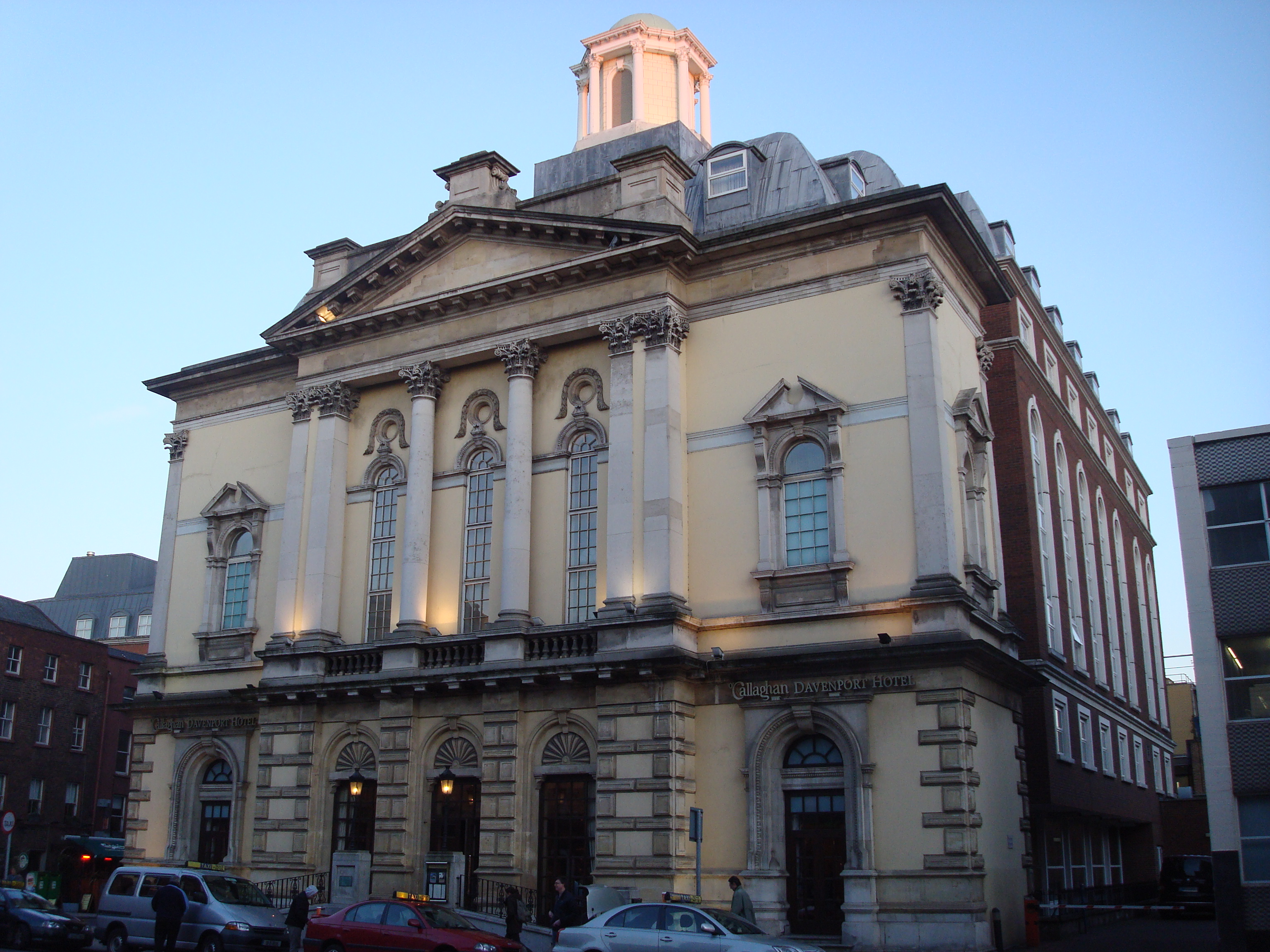
The original façade of Merrion Hall is retained in the current Davenport Hotel

Merrion Hall is a former Plymouth Brethren church built by Alfred Gresham Jones and completed in 1863 that was located near Merrion Square in Dublin, Ireland. It has been reconstructed and renovated and is now the Davenport Hotel, but the façade has been retained.

== History ==
The church was built by Alfred Gresham Jones (1824–1888) for the Plymouth Brethren. It was completed in 1863 at a cost of £16,000, and had a main hall capacity of 2500 to 3000 persons, plus many more standing.

The Plymouth Brethren originated in meetings in Dublin; the first public meeting of the group that came to worship at Merrion Hall was held at an auction room in Aungier Street in the 1820s. Until Merrion Hall was built, meetings continued in Aungier Street and at private houses in the city.

Merrion Hall was the largest Plymouth Brethren gospel hall ever constructed. There were three oval galleries and a double deck preacher's platform almost identical to that of the Metropolitan Tabernacle in London. The lower hall in the basement contained a below-floor baptism pool.

The Plymouth Brethren occupied the protected building until the late 1980s when it was sold to a developer. The building was largely destroyed by a fire on 2 May 1991 and subsequently re-developed as the Davenport Hotel, with only the façade remaining of the original building. The Italianate façade remains and is protected.

== In media ==
The building was used as a film location for the 1991 film Hear My Song portraying a Liverpool night club, such use being rather at odds with its original use. One of the few religious buildings mentioned in James Joyce's Ulysses is Merrion Hall.

== Dublin Builder entry ==
Description detailing the completed building from The Dublin Builder 1 September 1863
This building, which may be regarded in somewhat the same light as the Spurgeon Tabernacle, has been completed and opened. It was built for the special accommodation of the Rev. Denham Smith's congregation, and is a remarkable structure. The following are the particulars of its features and arrangements : —

The principal front faces Lower Merrion-street, and is in the Italian style, three storeys in height, the dimensions from foot-path to top of balustrade being 63 feet. The facade may be said to have three divisions; the centre or principal feature projects from the side-wings containing double staircases leading to the galleries. The lower part of the central projection is a piazza, having large arched openings separated by massive ornamented stone piers. The piazza is 46 feet in length and 9 feet in width, and leads into three internal porches in the body of the hall, affording shelter from the weather. The piers referred to also support an entablature of frieze and ornamented cornice separating the two lower storeys. The upper part of the centre is composed of Corinthian columns and pilasters supporting main entablature and bold projecting pediment. Both the upper and lower entablatures are continued alongside wings on their fronts and flanks, and the angles have handsome moulded and fluted quoins below and pilasters above, corresponding with those in central projection. In the lower storey of the staircase wings are large doors, with stone pilasters and heavy projecting carved hoods, and in the top storey large windows with stone pilasters and pediments, &c., over same. The sides of building facing Harcourt-place and Merrion-square were originally designed to be in character with the front, but have been carried out in a plainer manner, to reduce the expenditure. On the side next Harcourt-place, between the two projecting staircase towers, is a large area, which leads to extensive schools in the basement storey, well lighted and ventilated.

The walls of both sides and rear are pierced with four tiers of windows, which light the body of the hall and the galleries and the schools underneath. The materials used in constructing the front and ends are Portland and Caen stone, as well as for the cornices, mouldings, columns, and other dressings, the intermediate spaces being faced with the best white Suffolk bricks, the first, we understand, that have been introduced into this city. The effect obtained with these materials is elegant and striking. The interior of the building is exceedingly imposing. On entering from the street level into the spacious body of the hall, three galleries can be seen, one over the other, continued all round the entire building, and forming the centre part of the hall into an elliptical shape. The great loftiness of the building allows ample space between each of the galleries without in any way interfering with the light from the side windows. The galleries are supported on substantial ornamental cast iron columns, continued up from basement storey into roof, which they also help to support. The fronts of the galleries are formed into enriched cornices, supporting handsome iron ornamental open pattern balustrades. The platform for the choir and the pulpit platform are placed in front of the galleries at rear of the building, standing out well towards the centre, so that the speaker can be well heard and seen from all parts of the building. The choir floor is at a level, half way between the body or ground floor of hall and first gallery, being sufficiently high to allow the space under it to be occupied on crowded occasions. This affords considerable increased accommodation. The platform is supported on light columns, as also the pulpit which is over the lower platform, its floor being on the same level as the front of lower gallery; both platforms have semicircular fronts, and are enclosed with ornamental metal railings.

The floor of the body of hall reclines towards the platform, and the seats are arranged in amphitheatre form, so as that all face the preacher. The building throughout is fitted with permanent comfortable pew sittings of stained wood, the passage approaches being wide and convenient. The means of ingress and egress are most perfect in their arrangement, particular attention having been given to this object by the architect. There are in all ten entrance and exit doors, specially arranged for the convenience of the body of the hall and the galleries, so that the building is capable of being cleared in a few minutes. The three galleries are approached by six different staircases placed at the angles of the building; the front side wings each contain two separate double staircases, one in each being for the lower gallery alone, and the others for the two upper galleries. From their positions in the angles of the hall all crowding will be prevented. The ceiling of the hall is one of its beautiful features. It is deeply coved, and springs from handsomely enriched ornamental foliated capitals of the iron columns supporting the galleries, from which points enriched bands or ribs run up on the cove and on the underside of the arches between the columns, forming a groin at their junction with the arch of the ceiling. Over the centre of the hall in the ceiling there is formed a large compartment for ventilation. It is enclosed externally with sashes appearing above the roof; under those are fixed other sashes of ornamental forms, glazed with amber colour stained glass, which always presents the appearance of the sun shining into the building; the effect of which is novel and pleasing. These sashes are covered over with perforated zinc for protection.

The ventilation promises to be most perfect from the amount of attention; that has been bestowed upon it. The sashes in the sides of the ventilating compartment in the roof open for summer ventilation, as also all the window sashes in the side and rear walls; means being also adopted at each of the windows for admitting air without the sashes being opened. The undersides of the galleries, instead of being ceiled flat in the usual manner, are formed into arched coves between the columns and bearers, giving a light and airy effect to the building. The most complete and beautiful arrangements have been made for lighting, warming, and ventilating the building with gas. Round the entire range of galleries are a series of gas pendents so arranged as to carry away the heat and products of combustion by means of horizontal rows of pipes traversing the entire length and breadth of the building. These pipes become intensely heated after the gas has been lighted, and consequently radiate a vast amount of heat. They continue up the side angles of the building, and are connected to the funnels of two large sun-lights which are fixed in the centre of the dome. When the sun-burners are lighted, a draught is at once produced through all the tubes, thereby carrying off all the obnoxious vapours arising from the gas-burners. For ventilation this arrangement is most admirable, for it not only conducts away the foul air from the gas pendents, but also the vitiated atmosphere produced by the respiration of those seated in the building.

The view from the galleries is exceedingly fine, no gas-jets are to be seen whatever, but a rich halo of light universally diffused throughout the entire space, showing off the architectural beauty of the edifice. The idea of this combined principle of lighting, warming, and ventilating, originated with Henry Bewley, Esq., who instructed the Messrs. Edmundson and Company, of this city, to carry it into practice. Mr. Alfred G. Jones, of No. 3, Molesworth Street, is the architect, and the contractors are the Messrs. Cockburn and Sons, of Great Brunswick-street, who have executed their contract in an incredibly short time, and in a most substantial and satisfactory manner. The iron work has been done by Mr. Strong, of Hammond-lane. The dimensions of the site are about 85 feet in width by 90 feet in depth, and the building itself covers an area of 6,800 superficial feet. The cost is said to be about £16,000, including the fittings, furniture, &c. The building seats about 3,500, and, with standing room, would accommodate 5,000. The two upper galleries are free, as well as some of the pews in the body of the hall, and it is intended to keep 1,500 seats free to the public.

Merrion Hall is mentioned in Bono's 'Surrender -40 songs one story' as the place where his friend Guggi went 3 times per Sunday.

== See also ==
- Sweny's Pharmacy
- Victorian Turkish Baths, Lincoln Place
- Park Street School of Medicine
