= Archer's Garage =

Art Deco style building in Dublin, Ireland

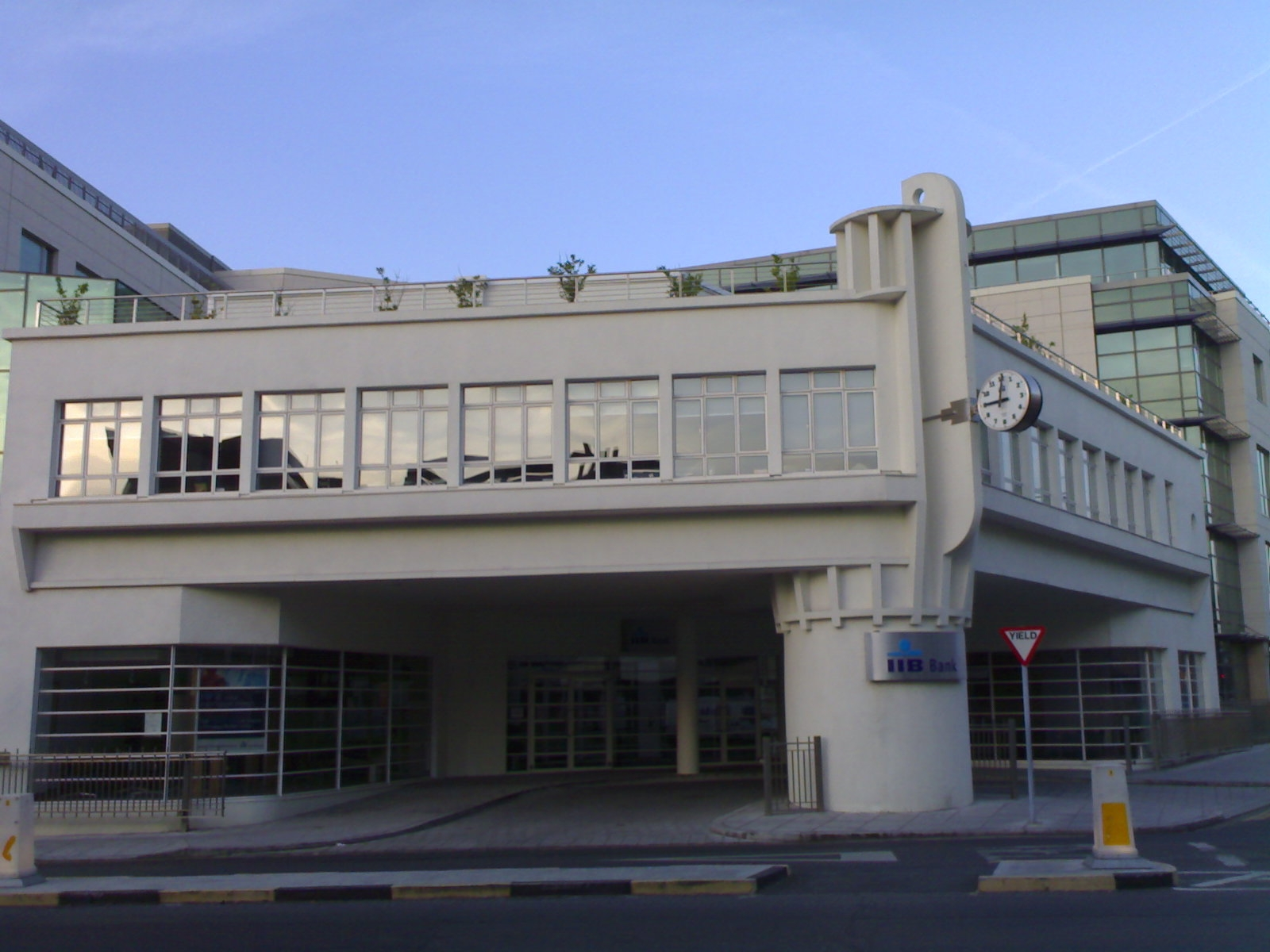
- Rebuilt Archer's Garage in May 2006
- Interactive map of the Archer's Garage area

General information
- Status: Facsimile (office use)
- Architectural style: Art Deco
- Location: Dublin, Ireland
- Coordinates: 53.34158°N 6.24592°W
- Completed: 1946
- Opened: Original garage: 1936; Demolished: 1999; Reinstated: 2001-2004
- Demolished: June 1999

Technical details
- Floor count: 2

Design and construction
- Architect: Arnold Francis Hendy

Archer's Garage is an art deco style building on the corner of Sandwith street and Fenian Street in Dublin 2.

== Construction ==
It was originally built in 1946 to the design of Billy Baird of Kaye Parry Ross Hendy architects and was constructed for Richard Archer who was the first agent for Ford motorcars in Ireland. It was the first building in Ireland to be built of reinforced concrete and fitted with fluorescent lighting.

== Demolition ==
Despite being a listed building it was illegally demolished in 1999 over the June bank holiday long weekend by property developer and hotelier Noel O’Callaghan. At the time of demolition it was the only surviving building on the largely derelict corner.

== Reconstruction ==
The demolition was controversial and as a result of legal action Dublin City Council forced the developers to build a facsimile of the building on the original site. Although originally scheduled to begin in September 1999, reconstruction commenced in 2001 but was then halted because of legal disputes concerning the garage and adjoining offices. It finally finished in 2004.

== Legal impact ==
The demolition resulted in the maximum jail time for the demolition of listed buildings being raised from three to five years. The maximum fine of £1 million did not change.

Noel O’Callaghan forestalled prosecution by signing an agreement with Dublin Corporation to reinstate the building.
