= Fergus Martin =

Irish painter

Fergus Martin is an Irish painter, and a member of Irish artistic academy Aosdána since 2001.

== Early life and education ==
Martin was born in Cork, Ireland. He studied painting at Dún Laoghaire School of Art from 1972 – 1976.

== Career ==
From 1979 – 1988 he lived and worked in Italy, where he lectured in English Language at the University of Milan.

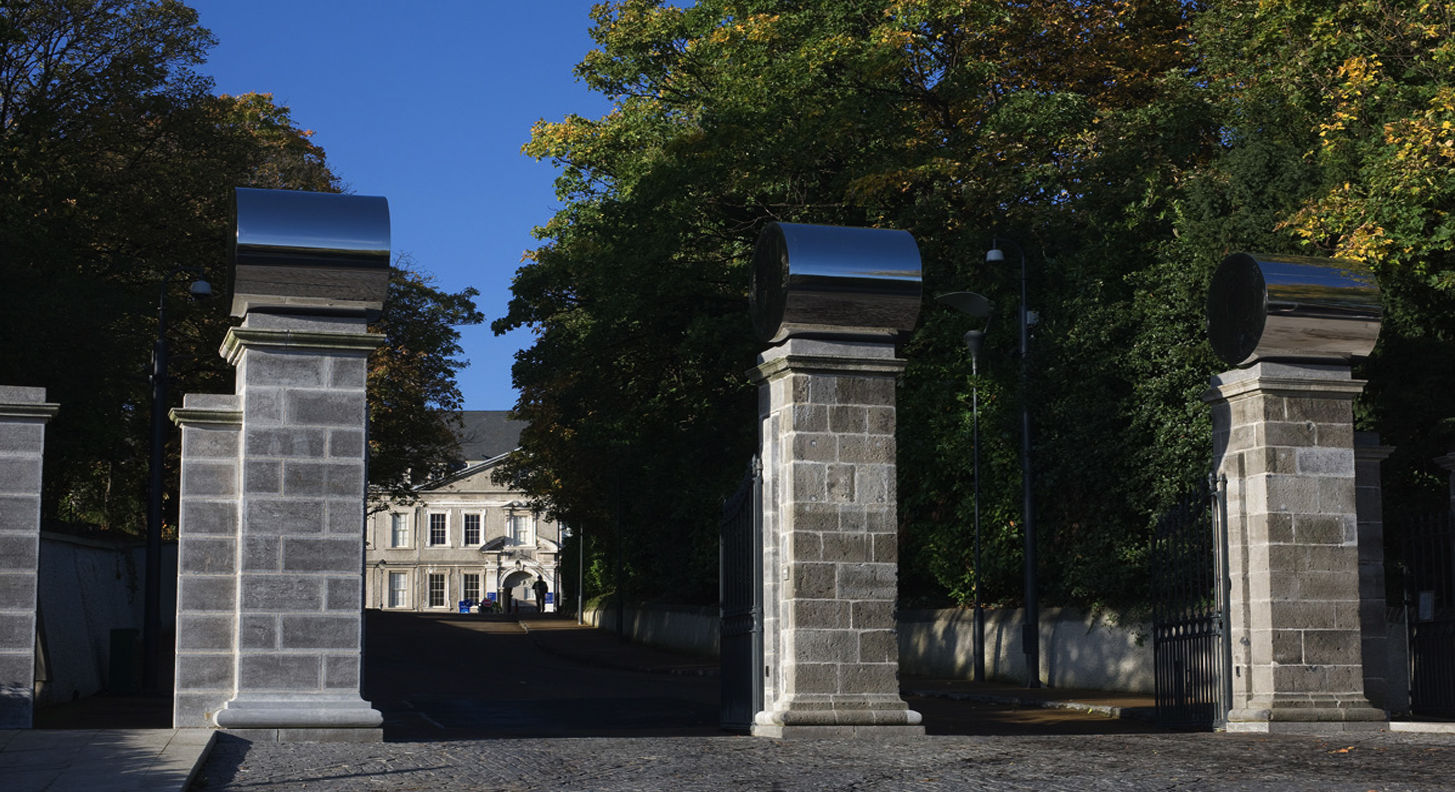
Steel, 2008, Irish Museum of Modern art, Dublin. Stainless steel three sections, each section 1m x 1.25m

In 1988, he returned to painting and had his first solo exhibition at the Oliver Dowling Gallery, Dublin, in 1990.

In 1991, he attended The New York Studio School of Drawing, Painting and Sculpture. He received awards from the Pollock-Krasner Foundation, New York, in 1999 and 2006, and was awarded The Marten Toonder Award by The Arts Council/An Comhairle Ealaíon in 1999.

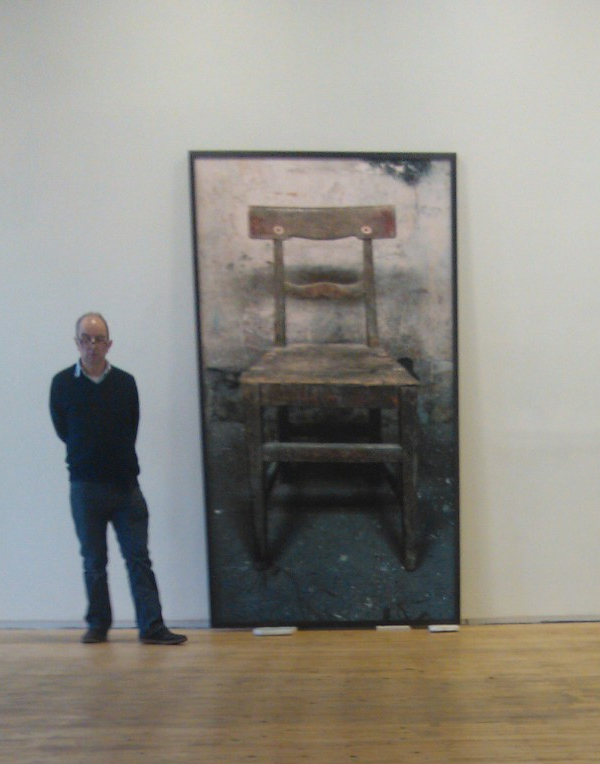
The artist Fergus Martin with A Chair 2014 Archival pigment print 266 x 150 cm

In 2007, his sculpture, Steel, was commissioned by the Office of Public Works, under the Per Cent for Art Scheme, as a permanent sculpture at the entrance gates to the Irish Museum of Modern Art. It was installed in 2008. In 2011, Steel was destroyed by trucks that were unable to pass through the new spaces between the gates. The sculpture has not been remade or restored to its original position.

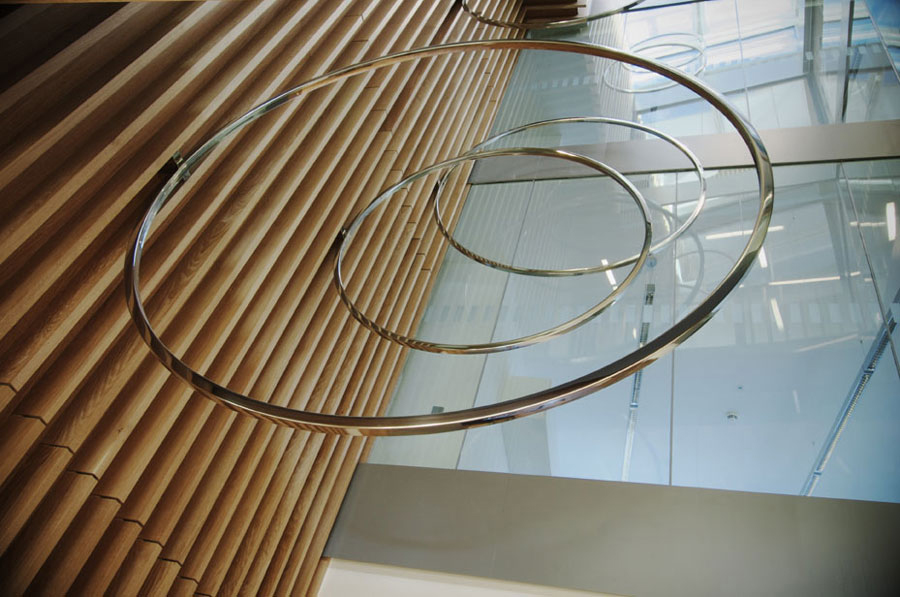
Lincoln Place, 2010, sculpture for four-storey atrium, Dublin Dental Hospital. Stainless steel. Dimensions variable

In 2008, Martin had a major exhibition at the Hugh Lane Gallery. A survey book on Martin's work was published by Dublin City Gallery The Hugh Lane on the occasion of this exhibition. In 2010, his sculpture, Lincoln Place, was commissioned for a new four-storey atrium at Dublin Dental University Hospital.

Martin's solo exhibition, Outside Inside, was held at Green on Red Gallery, Dublin in 2014. In September 2016, Martin presented an exhibition of new work at Green on Red Gallery at Spencer Dock, Dublin. The exhibition Fergus Martin Then and Now took place between February and October 2019 at the Irish Museum of Modern Art. This exhibition presented painting, sculpture and photography from the 1990s to the present.

== Recognition ==
In 2001, he was elected to Aosdána. Aosdána is an affiliation of creative artists in Ireland. It was established in 1981 by the Arts Council of Ireland to honour artists whose work has made an outstanding contribution to the creative arts in Ireland and to encourage and assist members in devoting their energies fully to their art.

In 2010, he won the Curtin O’Donoghue Photography Prize at The RHA Annual Exhibition, Dublin. In 2014, he was awarded the Irish American Cultural Institute O’Malley Award.

== Martin & Hobbs ==
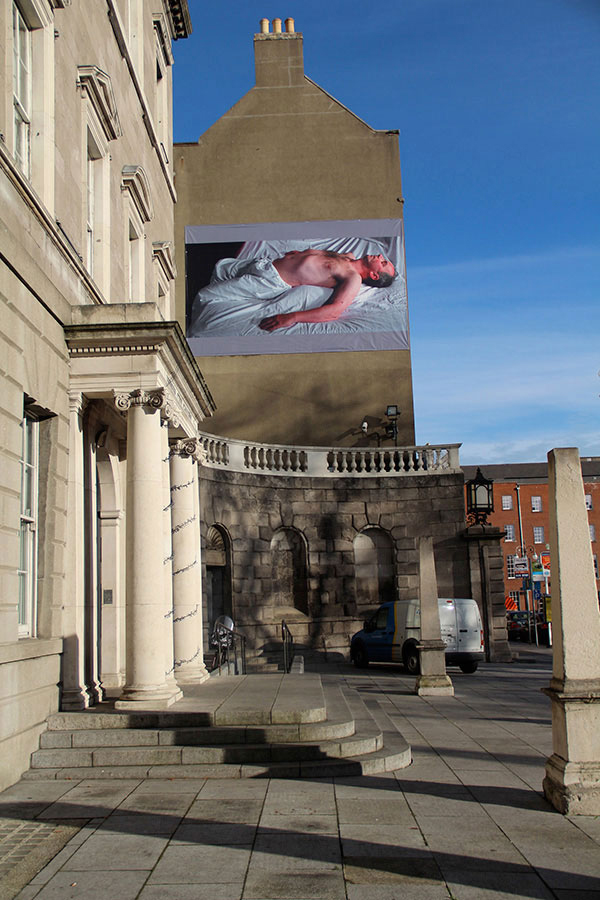
Fergus Martin and Anthony Hobbs My Paradise is Now 2003 Dublin City Gallery The Hugh Lane 2013

Martin & Hobbs was a collaborative project between the painter Fergus Martin and the photographer Anthony Hobbs. They joined forces in 2001 out of a desire by both artists to explore new ways of experiencing the human figure as a living entity and to bring to this their different experiences as painters and photographers. Their first exhibition was My Paradise is here at the Oratorio di San Ludovico in Venice, in 2003.

Also in 2003, they showed their second exhibition My Paradise is Now at Green on Red Gallery, Dublin. These two projects were re-worked and shown again in 2012/2013, as a banner outside Dublin City Gallery The Hugh Lane, at the Irish Museum of Modern Art and BOZAR in Brussels during Ireland's EU presidency in 2013, and in the 7th Biennial of International Contemporary Art in Melle, France.

Their work is in the collections of The Arts Council of Ireland and The Irish Museum of Modern Art.
