= Park Street School of Medicine =

Former medical school in Dublin, Ireland

Park Street School of Medicine was a private medical school in Dublin, Ireland. It was founded on 32 Park Street (now Lincoln Place), Dublin, in 1824 by a group of renowned physicians, including Robert James Graves and Arthur Jacob.

The school was absorbed into the Trinity College medical school from 1856.

From 1850, St. Mark's Ophthalmic Hospital operated from the same site until it was combined to form the Royal Victoria Eye and Ear Hospital in 1895.

In 1849, Professor Hugh Carlisle purchased the School's anatomy specimens for £500, which he relocated to Queen's College, Belfast.

== Notable faculty ==
- John Houston
- Arthur Jacob

== See also ==
- Victorian Turkish baths, Lincoln Place
