= Fenian Street =

Street in Dublin, Ireland

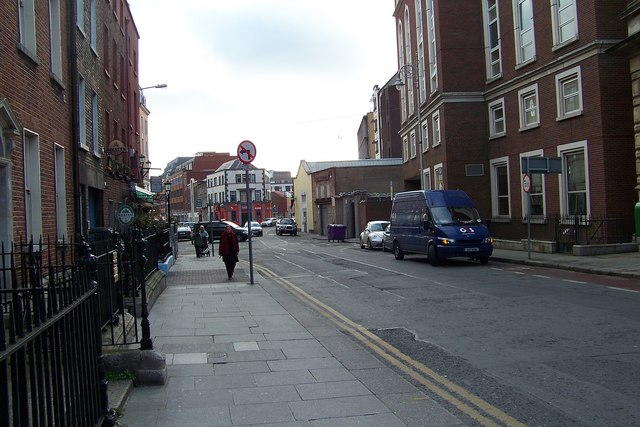
- Fenian Street as seen from Lincoln Place

- Location within Central Dublin
- Native name: Sráid na bhFíníní (Irish)
- Former names: Denzille Street, Denzil Street
- Namesake: Fenian Brotherhood (previously: Denzil Holles, 1st Baron Holles)
- Location: Dublin, Ireland
- Postal code: D02
- Coordinates: 53.3416066°N 6.2508416°W
- east end: Hogan Place
- west end: Lincoln Place

Other
- Known for: collapse of tenement houses in 1963

Fenian Street (Irish: Sráid na bhFíníní) is a street in Dublin, Ireland.

== Location ==
Fenian Street runs from Lincoln Place at the western end, to Hogan Place at the eastern end, parallel with Pearse Street.

== History ==
Fenian Street was formally called Denzille or Denzil Street, first appearing on maps around 1770. It was named after Denzil Holles, 1st Baron Holles, one of the famous Five Members whom Charles I tried to arrest in the English House of Commons. It was renamed Fenian Street, after the Fenian Brotherhood, who operated from the street in the 1850s.

One notable resident in the early years of the 20th Century was Brigit Dowling, later Brigit Hitler, who was living here with her family when she and her father met Adolf Hitler's half-brother, Alois Hitler Jr., in 1909 at the Dublin Horse Show. Brigit and Alois later eloped to Liverpool, married and had a son, William Patrick, who later adopted the less controversial surname Stuart-Houston.

On 12 June 1963, 2a, 3, and 4 Fenian Street tenement houses collapsed. This resulted in the deaths of two young girls, Linda Byrne (aged 8) and Marion Vardy (aged 9), who were passing the building when it collapsed. The collapse was blamed on the fast drying out of water saturated bricks after a period of heavy rain, and prompted demands for poorly maintained and dangerous tenement buildings to be demolished. In the 18 months after the collapse on Fenian Street, over 1200 Georgian houses in Dublin were demolished.

== Architecture ==
No. 25 Fenian Street is one of the oldest buildings in the area, predating the layout of nearby Merrion Square. Dating from the 17th century, the street would have been a coastal road at the time of construction, with the house facing the coastline and bay. The current building was first built in 1729 with a high pitched roof which was later amended to a more Palladian style. The building was subject to emergency remedial works in 2015.

Archer's Garage is a notable building on the corner of Fenian Street and Sandwith Street.

== See also ==
- List of streets and squares in Dublin
