= William Kaye-Parry =

Irish civil engineer and architect

- Born: 28 June 1853; Salthill, County Dublin
- Died: 10 November 1932 (aged 79); Paddington, London
- Occupation: Architect

William Kaye-Parry (28 June 1853 – 10 November 1932) was an Irish architect and civil engineer.

== Early life and education ==
He was born on 28 June 1853, the son of William Parry, proprietor of the Salthill Hotel, Salthill, County Dublin. He was christened William Kaye Parry, later hyphenating his name before legally changing it to Kaye-Parry in 1905.

From 1 November 1870 to 1 November 1873 he was articled to John McMurdy. He then entered Trinity College Dublin (TCD) where he obtained a Bachelor of Engineering in 1875 with special certificates in practical engineering as well as mechanical and experimental physics. He was awarded an MA in 1879.

== Career ==
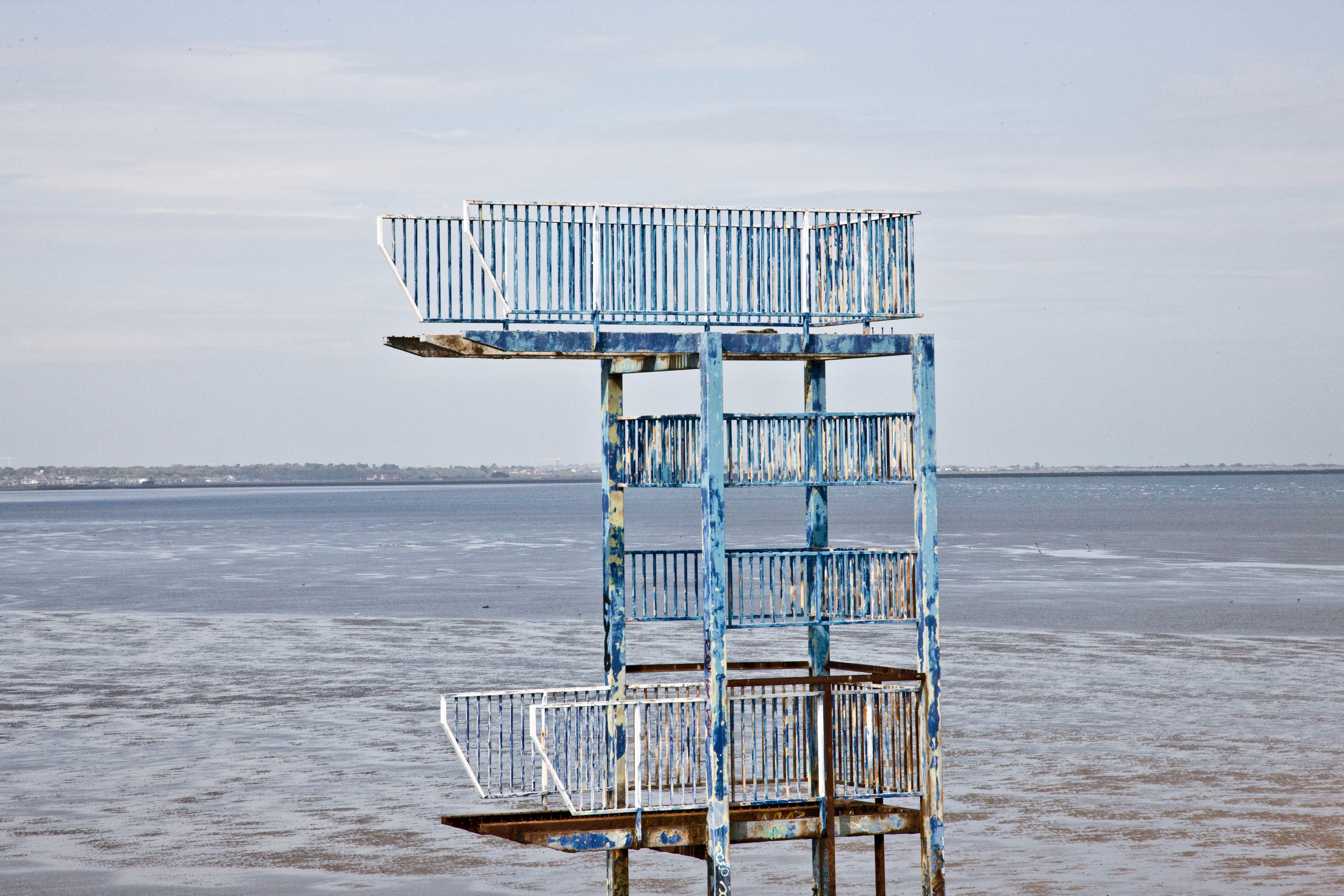
Blackrock Baths in 2008

He began to practice as an independent architect and civil engineer in 1877. In 1880 he won a competition for a design of a concert hall held by the Royal Irish Academy of Music. He also exhibited at the Royal Hibernian Academy that year, as well as in 1881 to 1883, 1886 and 1896. He was surveyor to the Kingstown Estate from 1896 to 1903. He designed the 186 Inchicore Methodist church, and his design for the new Alexandra School, Earlsfort Terrace won first prize. He entered into a partnership with George Murray Ross in 1889, moving to 63 Dawson St under the name Kaye Parry & Ross, (later Kaye-Parry & Ross). The partnership opened a London office in 1900.

He had a reputation for expertise in domestic sanitation and sewage as well as architecture. He was a founder and engineer to the Dublin Sanitary Association from 1883 to 1890. He was consulting engineer to the Ulster Sanitary Association in 1891. He was also university examiner in practical sanitary engineering for the qualification of state medicine for TCD in 1895 and external examiner in sanitary engineering in the Faculty of Technology, Victoria University of Manchester. In 1886, he designed the Blackrock Baths. He oversaw the installation of sewerage and plumbing in Richmond Lunatic Asylum in 1889, Blue Coat Hospital in 1890, St Vincent's, and Cork Street Fever Hospital.

With Ross, Kaye-Parry was a chief engineer on the Blackrock and Kingstown main drainage boards, and consulting engineers to the Killiney and Clontarf urban councils. They planned the drainage schemes for Armagh, Maynooth, Malahide, and Tullamore 1901, and Mitchelstown in 1906. They designed water works for Howth in 1906 to 1907, Kinsale in 1909, and Maynooth. They also designed baths for Kingstown, Warrenpoint, Bangor, and the Iveagh Trust.

Kaye-Parry was a member of the Institution of Civil Engineers, British Institution of Public Health and a Fellow of the Royal Sanitary Association and Royal Institution of British Architects. He served in numerous positions with the Royal Institute of the Architects of Ireland.

In 1927 Arnold Francis Hendy, an assistant in the practice was taken on as a full partner and the firm became known as Kaye-Parry Ross & Hendy.

== Family and later life ==
In 1882, he moved to 1 Tivoli Parade, Kingstown (Dún Laoghaire), living in Kingstown until his retirement in 1927. He suffered a severe accident in 1921 when he broke his thigh in two places - an injury he never fully recovered from. After living in London for several years, he died on 10 November 1932 at 36 Delaware Mansions, Paddington of pneumonia.

Kaye-Parry married and had at least three sons. Eric and Stanley Kaye-Parry both served in WWI, and Kenneth, who all attended TCD.
