= Arthur Jacob =

Irish ophthalmologist

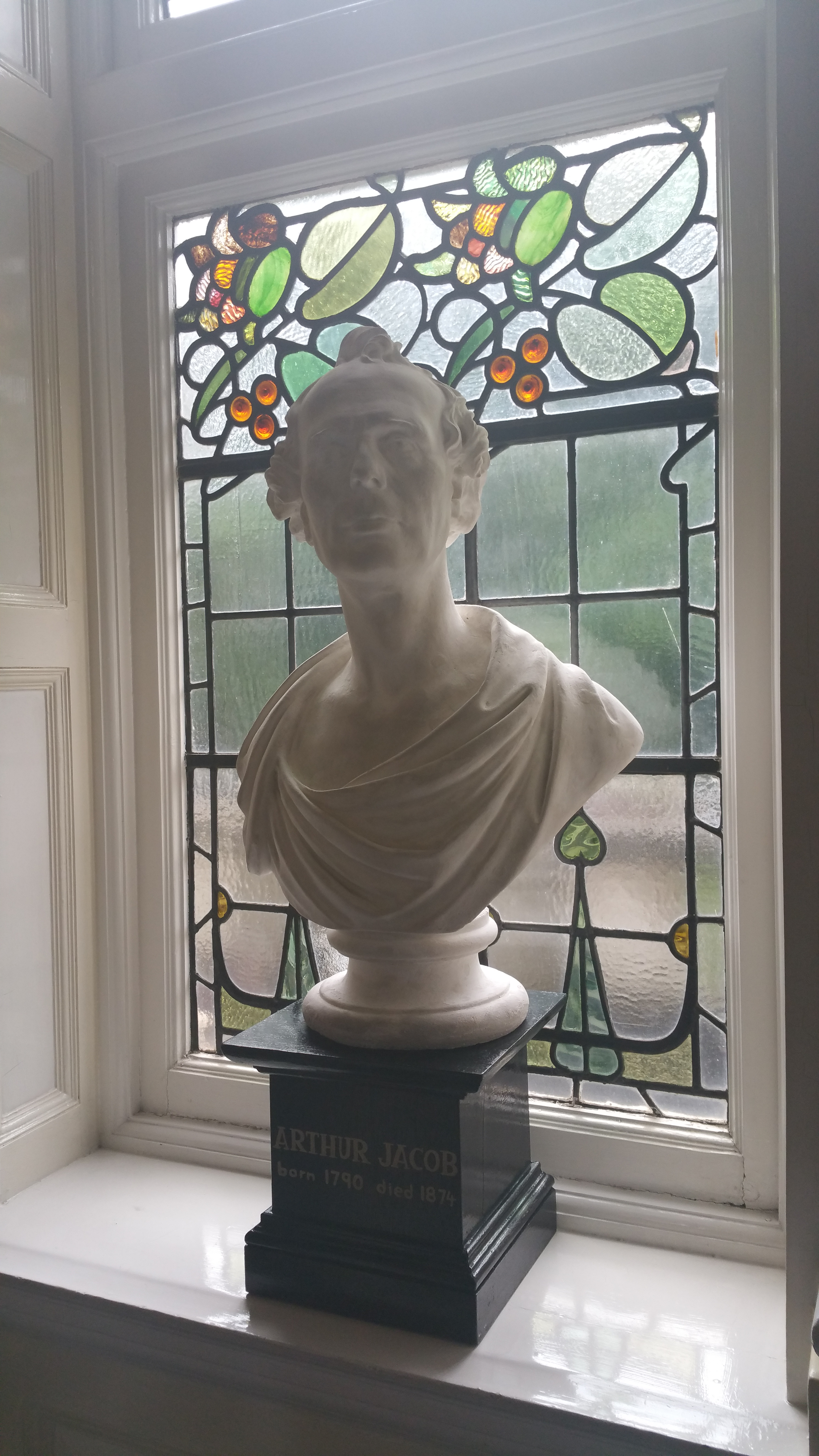
- Photograph of a marble bust of Arthur Jacob on the main staircase of the Royal Victoria Eye and Ear Hospital, Dublin, Ireland
- Born: Arthur Jacob; June 1790; Maryborough, Ireland
- Died: 1874
- Citizenship: Ireland
- Occupation: Ophthalmologist

Arthur Jacob (1790–1874) was an Irish ophthalmologist. He is known for founding several hospitals, a medical school, and a medical journal. He contributed to science and academia through his 41-year term as Professor of Anatomy at the Royal College of Surgeons in Ireland (RCSI) and as the first Irish ocular pathologist. He was elected President of RCSI in 1837 and 1864.

== Biography ==
Jacob, second son of John Jacob, M.D. (1754–1827), surgeon to the Queen's County (now Laois) infirmary, Maryborough (now Portlaoise), Ireland, by his wife Grace (1765–1835), only child of Jerome Alley of Donoughmore, was born at Knockfin, Maryborough, on 13 or 30 June 1790. He studied medicine with his father and at Steevens's Hospital, Dublin, under Abraham Colles. Having graduated M.D. at the University of Edinburgh in 1814, he set out on a walking tour through the United Kingdom, crossing the Channel at Dover, and continuing his walk from Calais to Paris.

He studied at Paris until Napoleon's return from Elba. He subsequently pursued his studies in London under Sir B. Brodie, Sir A. Cooper, and Sir W. Lawrence. In 1819 he returned to Dublin, and became demonstrator of anatomy under Dr. James Macartney at Trinity College. Here his anatomical researches gained for him a reputation, and he collected a museum, which Macartney afterwards sold to the University of Cambridge.

On leaving Macartney, Jacob joined with Graves and others in founding the Park Street School of Medicine. In 1826 he was elected Professor of Anatomy and Physiology at Royal College of Surgeons in Ireland (RCSI), and held the chair until 1869. He was elected President of RCSI in 1837 and 1864. Jacob founded an Ophthalmic Hospital in Pitt (now Balfe) Street in 1829 and in 1832, in conjunction with Charles Benson and others, he founded the City of Dublin Hospital, Baggot Street and later practiced there after the opening of a dedicated eye ward. His younger rival, Sir William Wilde, subsequently founded the competing St. Mark's Ophthalmic Hospital in Lincoln Place (beside Trinity College) in 1844.

In 1839, with Dr. Henry Maunsell, he started the Dublin Medical Press, a weekly journal of medical science, and edited forty-two volumes (1839 to 1859), in order “to diffuse useful knowledge… to instil honourable principles, and foster kind feelings in the breast of the student” among other desirable aims. He also contributed to the Dublin Journal of Medical Science. He took an active part in founding the Royal Medical Benevolent Fund Society of Ireland and the Irish Medical Association.

At the age of seventy-five he retired from the active pursuit of his profession. His fame rests on his anatomical and ophthalmological discoveries.

In December 1860 a medal bearing Jacob's likeness was struck and presented to him, and his portrait, bust, and library were later placed in the Royal College of Surgeons in Ireland. He died at Newbarnes, Barrow-in-Furness, on 21 September 1874.

== Works ==
In 1819 Jacob announced the discovery, which he had made in 1816, of a previously unknown membrane of the eye, in a paper in the Philosophical Transactions (pt. i. pp. 300–7). The membrane has been known since as membrana Jacobi and forms the retina. Apart from his discovery of the membrana Jacobi, he described Jacob's ulcer, and revived cataract surgery through the cornea with a curved needle, Jacob's needle. To the Cyclopædia of Anatomy he contributed an article on the eye, and to the Cyclopædia of Practical Medicine treatises on Ophthalmia and Amaurosis. His major publications included:

1. A treatise on the inflammations of the eyeball : including the idiopathic, scrofulous, rheumatic, arthritic, syphilitic, gonorroeal, post-febrile, sympathetic, phlebitic, and neuralgic species or varieties. Dublin : Dublin Medical Press, 1849.
2. On the operation for the removal of cataract : as performed with a fine sewing needle through the cornea, 1850. On the operation for the removal of cataract : as performed with a fine sewing needle through the cornea. Dublin : Medical Press Office, 1850.
3. On cataract, and the operation for its removal by absorption, with the fine needle through the cornea. Dublin: Medical Press, 1851.
4. Essays, anatomical, zoological, surgical, and miscellaneous : reprinted from the Philosophical Transactions, Transactions of the Medico-Chirurgical Society of London, Dublin Philosophical Journal, Dublin Hospital Reports, Reports of the British Association for the Advancement of Science, and the Dublin Medical Press. Dublin, London, Paris : Fannin; Churchill; Bailliere, 1845.

== Family ==
In 1824 Jacob married Sarah, daughter of Coote Carroll, of Ballymote, County Sligo. She died on 6 January 1839. By her he had five sons.
