= Alfred Gresham Jones =

Irish architect

Alfred Gresham Jones (1824–1915) was an Irish architect who moved to Australia after 1888.

Jones was born in 1824 in Dublin, and attended the Royal Dublin Society's School of Architectural Drawing in the 1840s and spent time in London and with Irish architect John Skipton Mulvany before beginning his own career.

His architect career in Ireland began in the 1850s, and by 1888 he had emigrated to Australia, but it is unclear if he continued his vocation.

== Buildings designed by Jones ==
Most of Jones' work was in Dublin before 1888:

- Strathmore (Killiney), Dublin 1860s
- Dalkey Methodist Church, Dublin 1861
- interior of Merrion Hall Dublin 1863 - now O'Callaghan-Davenport Hotel
- Dublin Exhibition Crystal Palace 1863 - preparatory to the International Exhibition of Arts and Manufactures
- Bray Methodist Church, Bray, County Wicklow 1864
- Sandymount Methodist Church, Dublin 1864
- Athlone Methodist Church 1865
- St. Paul's Church, Glenageary, County Dublin 1865
- Earlsfort Terrace complex, Dublin 1865
- Villa Carlotta, Monkstown 1870
- Villa Verona, Monkstown 1873
- Wesley College, Dublin 1879
- Mytilene, 53 Ailesbury Road, Dublin 1883

== Personal life ==
Jones married Julia Charlotte Malyn (died 1929) in 1855 and they had several children (Charlotte Dixon, Alice Johnson, Mary Watson, Alfred, Maude Allen and Walter).

== Later years and death ==
Jones immigrated to Australia, but does not appear to have practised as an architect, as no major work is accounted to him during this time. He developed an interest in verse during this time and died in Melbourne in 1915.
