= Bray Methodist Church =

- Bray Methodist Church
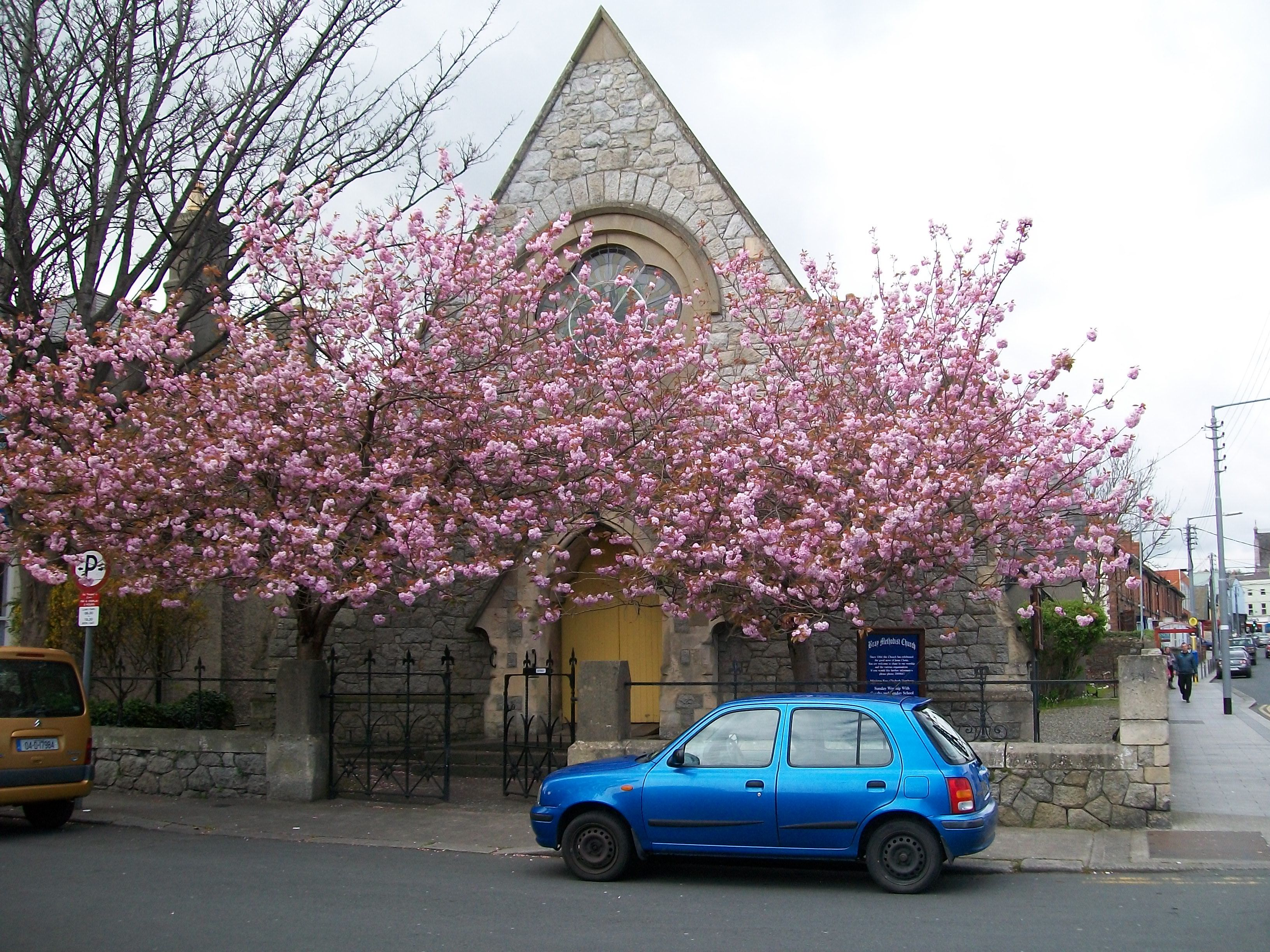
- Bray Methodist Church
- Bray Methodist Church
- 53°12′12.80002″N 6°6′36.00000″W
- Location: Bray, County Wicklow
- Country: Ireland
- Denomination: Methodist Church in Ireland

History
- Founded: 1864

The Bray Methodist Church is a parish of the Methodist Church in Ireland situated on Eglington Road in Bray, County Wicklow, Ireland.

== History ==
The church was built in 1864 in Irish Gothic Revival architecture by the Irish architect Alfred Gresham Jones.

It was built with granite and sandstone material. The main facade has a neo-Gothic arch topped with wooden doors and a rose window in the center ornamented with stained glass. The windows are pointed arch with geometric tracery. The roof, with a gable slope, is topped with slate. The church has a small house-abbey attached with the same architectural style topped by a granite fireplace.

The church is set back behind on the street and surrounded by trees and hedges and a stone wall topped with a wrought iron fence. The temple has two facades, the main façade on Eglington Road and the side façade on Florence Road. Its state of conservation is good.
