= Richard Barter (sculptor and architect) =

Irish sculptor

- Born: circa 1824; Macroom, County Cork, Ireland
- Died: 5 January 1896; Dublin
- Occupations: Sculptor and architect

Richard Barter (circa 1824 – 5 January 1896) was an Irish sculptor and architect.

== Life ==
Richard Barter was born around 1824 in Macroom, County Cork. In 1844, aged about 20, Barter entered the Royal Dublin Society's School. While still a student in 1847, he won a prize from the Irish Art Union for his statuette Venus and Cupid. During this time, he became a friend of Daniel O'Connell. He moved to London for a few years, where he met and became life-long friends with John Henry Foley. He returned to Dublin briefly, but later moved back to County Cork, settling in St Ann's Hill, Blarney in 1853. He was also an architect and a musician, playing the flageolet,.

In 1851, he exhibited as part of the Great Exhibition in London. He produced primarily portrait busts and small subject groups. In 1845, 1847 and 1851 he exhibited with the Royal Hibernian Academy, primarily miniature busts in ivory. Between 1864 and 1874 he occasionally exhibited with the Royal Academy.

According to Professor Paula Murphy of UCD, contemporary critics commented that Barter would have achieved "much, much greater success if he had remained in London" rather than returning to Ireland as he did.

Richard Barter died at St Ann's on 5 January 1896, and is buried in St Finn Barr's Cemetery, Cork.

== Designer of Victorian Turkish baths ==
Having settled at St Ann's, Barter became involved, early in 1856, in the building of a Turkish bath. His namesake, Dr Richard Barter, in conjunction with David Urquhart, author of The Pillars of Hercules, had been attempting to build such a bath at his hydropathic establishment there. They had been basing their design on the model of the Islamic hammam which Urquhart had described in his book, but their experimental bath failed because it was too steamy, and not hot enough for curative purposes.

At Dr Barter's request, Richard Barter travelled to Rome to study the ancient baths there. The knowledge he gained enabled the building, later in 1856, of the first successful Victorian Turkish bath—one specifically built for use by the hydro's patients and staff. In Europe, the Victorian Turkish bath is now often known as the Irish-Roman bath in honour of the two Barters.

Thereafter Richard Barter designed at least nine Turkish baths for the doctor. Mrs Donovan, referring to 'Mr R Barter (artist)', wrote, 'This gentleman was, we believe, Dr Barter's only architect, and the baths all bear testimony to his architectural and artistic skill.' For some time it was widely thought, and noted in the Dictionary of Irish Architects, that the baths at Bray (1859) were designed by Sir John Benson. This was based on a paragraph in the first issue of the Dublin Builder. Less widely noticed was a very small corrective Editor's note in the following month's issue to the effect that 'the arrangement and design of the proposed baths...is due to Mr Barter, of Cork.'

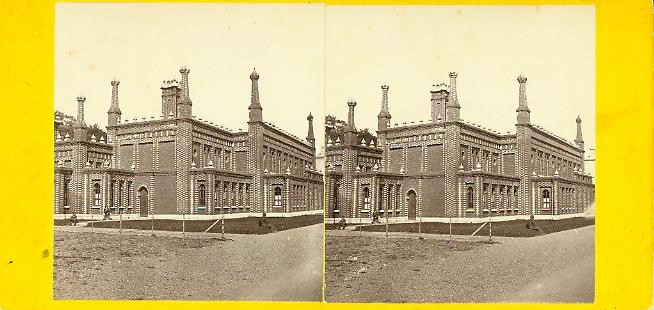
Stereocard depicting architect Richard Barter's Victorian Turkish baths, opened 1860 in Quinsborough Road, Bray

Victorian Turkish baths designed by Richard Barter include those in Grenville Place, Cork, the first in Ireland to be opened (in 1859) for general public use, those in the grounds of the Killarney Hotel (1859), the pseudo-oriental-looking baths at Quinsborough Road, Bray (1860) and in Lincoln Place, Dublin (1860), that at Military Road (now O'Connell Avenue), Limerick (1860), the Donegall Street baths in Belfast (1860), the baths in Hardy's Road, Waterford, (1861), the short-lived, externally non-oriental-looking Oriental Baths in Victoria Street, London (1862), and the doctor's final set of baths at St Ann's Hydro in 1870.

In 1867, Dr Barter severed his connection with the Lincoln Place establishment in Dublin and decided to build a new one in the city. He purchased the Reynolds Hotel in Upper Sackville Street (now O'Connell Street), and renamed it the Dublin Hammam Hotel and Turkish Baths. Richard Barter would seem to have been in the process of supervising the construction of the new baths when Dr Barter died. His eldest son, also called Richard, inherited the hydro and decided to complete the Hammam, arranging for it to be run by a manager and a resident physician.

There has been much confusion over the possibility of there being a familial relationship between the architect and Dr Barter, some sources claiming he was the son, and others the nephew, of the doctor. However, Thomas Crosbie's obituary makes no mention of a family connection, and the physician's family friend Mrs Donovan, in her memoir Recollections, refers to the architect solely as 'This Gentleman'. The similarity of names is coincidental; Dr Barter's eldest son (also confusingly named Richard), although continuing to own the hydro and baths, was later knighted for his services to Agriculture, his main interest.

== Selected works ==
- Bust of Daniel O'Connell (1847)
- Bust of Catherine Hayes (1851)
- Bust of Thomas Little
- Bust of Charles Stewart Parnell
