= George Murray Ross =

George Murray Ross (1852 – 27 October 1927) was an Irish engineer.

== Early life and education ==
He was born in Dublin in 1852, a son of William Ross and with an older brother also called William Ross. He was sent to Merchiston Castle School and studied engineering in Trinity College Dublin, graduating in 1873.

== Career ==
He joined the Board of Works after graduating and later worked at his father's business before closing it down and setting up his own independent business at 61 Dawson Street.

He entered a partnership with William Kaye-Parry in 1898 or 1899. The two shared an interest in domestic sanitation.

He played a major part in the Dublin International Exhibition of 1907.

He was president of the Institution of Civil Engineers of Ireland from 1909 to 1911. He was also vice-president of the Irish Roads Congress which was in April 1910.

In early summer 1917, as part of the First World War, he went to France as senior engineer in charge of a labour battalion to construct roads and railways.

== Personal life ==
He married his wife Alice Jane circa 1879 and they had two children. Their son George Maybin Ross (1883-1954) obtained a Bachelor of Engineering from Trinity College Dublin in 1904 and worked briefly for Kay-Parry & Ross and had a distinguished career as an engineer in India.

== Death ==
He died suddenly at his home, Summerfield in Dalkey, on 27 October 1927.
