= Richard Barter (physician) =

Irish physician

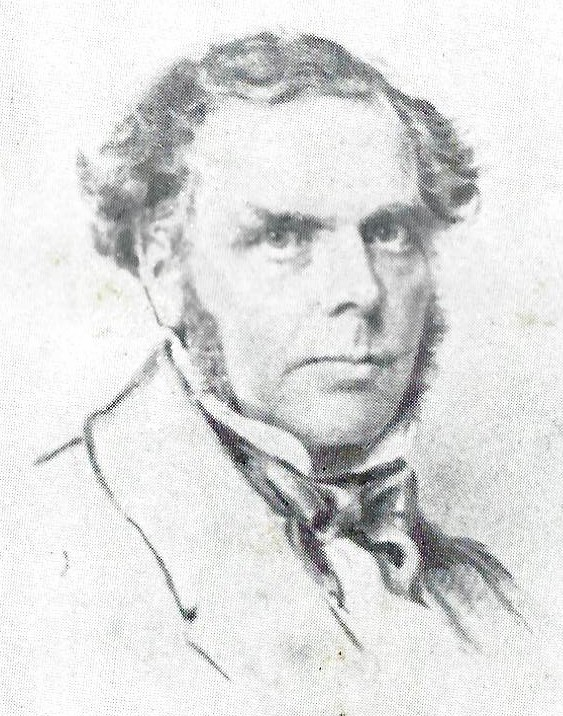
- Born: 1802; Cooldaniel, County Cork, Ireland
- Died: 3 October 1870 (aged 67–68); Blarney

Richard Barter (1802 – 3 October 1870) was an Irish physician and proponent of hydropathy. He collaborated with David Urquhart on the introduction of Victorian Turkish baths into the United Kingdom. Barter founded St Ann(e)'s Hydropathic Establishment at St Ann's Hill, located near Cork, in 1844.

== Early life and family ==
Richard Barter was born in 1802 in Cooldaniel, County Cork. His parents were Richard and Elizabeth Barter (née Berkely). He had 6 siblings. Barter was trained at the College of Physicians in London, and became a members of the Royal College of Surgeons of England in 1828. He returned to Ireland to take up a position in Inniscarra, County Cork as a dispensary doctor.

He married Mary Newman in 1836. She was the daughter John Newman of Dromore, County Cork. They had 4 daughters and 7 sons. Two of their sons, Richard and Ulick were knighted. He died on 3 October 1870 at Blarney.

The Dictionary of Irish Architects assumes that Barter was the father of the sculptor Richard Barter, but this does not appear to be the case.

== Career ==
Barter became interested in the use of hydropathy having seen its use during the cholera epidemic of 1832, and subsequently opened St Ann(e)'s Hydropathic Establishment in Blarney, County Cork in 1844. He drew on the work of David Urquhart and later asked him to supervise the construction of what became the first Victorian Turkish bath in Great Britain and Ireland, the foundation of which was laid on 7 June 1856 at Blarney. Barter later adapted the design to incorporate a hot-air vapourless system which was based on Roman baths rather than Turkish. This building had stained-glass windows and marble floors. An extension was later added to facilitate domestic animals and free facilities for the poor. These baths were considered to be among the leading European hydropathic establishments. Barter went on to build a number of baths across Ireland, including those at Lincoln Place and Upper Sackville Street in Dublin. He also travelled extensively lecturing on his patented bath system, which he claimed prevented and cured disease. He also edited chapters from Urquhart's The Pillars of Hercules under the title The Turkish bath, with a view to its introduction into the British dominions.

Barter was a founding member and the honorary secretary of the County of Cork Agricultural Society.
