= Victorian Turkish baths, Dublin, Upper Sackville Street =

Turkish baths in Dublin, Ireland

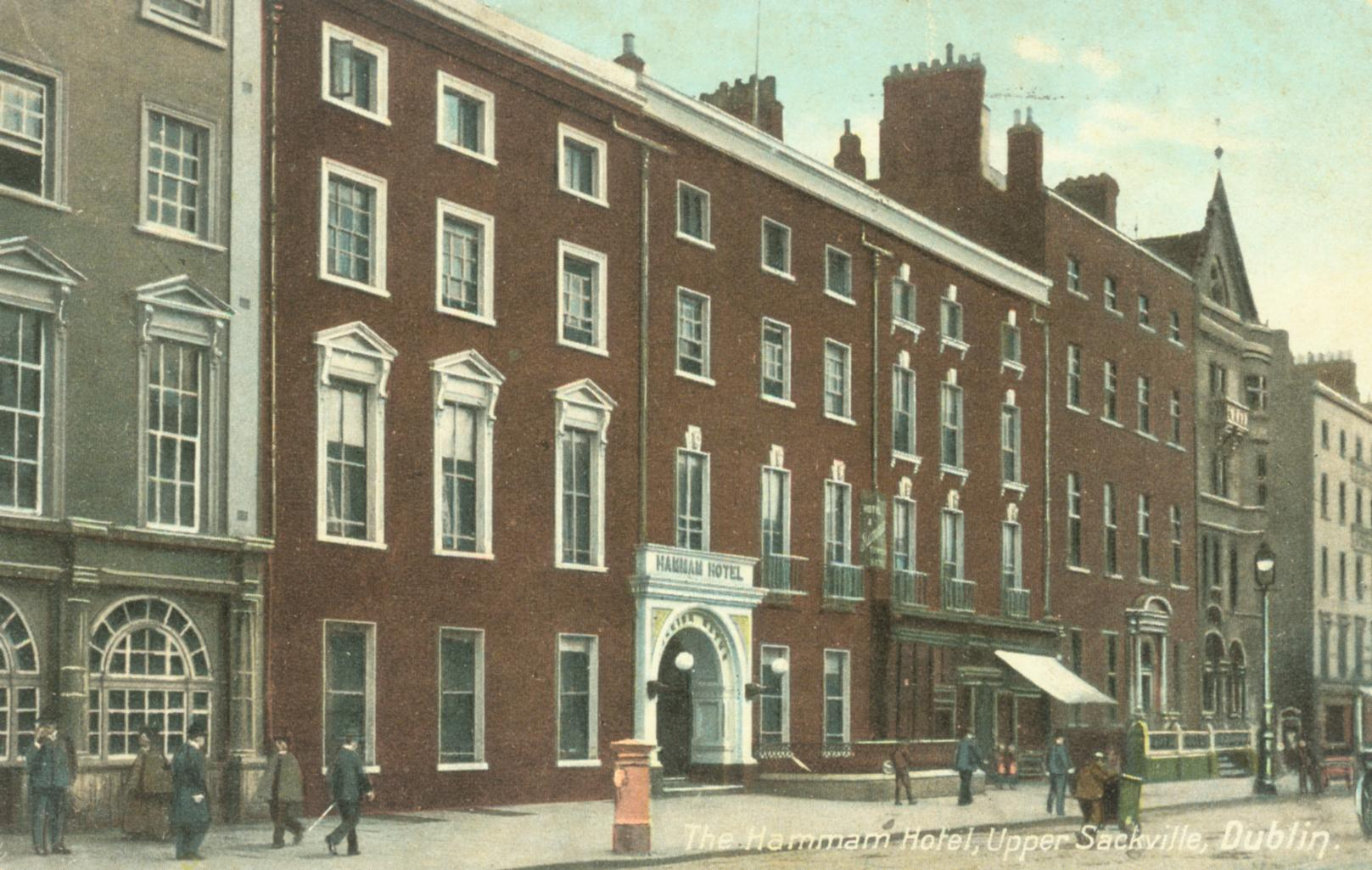
Exterior of the Hammam Hotel and Turkish baths, Dublin

The Victorian Turkish baths in Upper Sackville Street (now O’Connell Street), Dublin, Ireland, opened on 17 March 1869. They were the second Turkish baths built under the auspices of the physician Richard Barter, the first being those for the Turkish Bath Company of Dublin Ltd at Lincoln Place which opened on 2 February 1860. By 1867, after differences between Barter and the company about changes being made to the bath, he had left the company, determined that his Turkish baths in the capital should be run on the principles he had established for all his baths.

The baths remained open till 5 July 1922 when they were destroyed by explosions and fire during the Irish Civil War. They are significant for being the last Turkish baths designed by Barter who, with the Scottish/English politician David Urquhart, was responsible for the reintroduction of Turkish baths into the British Isles.

== The early years ==
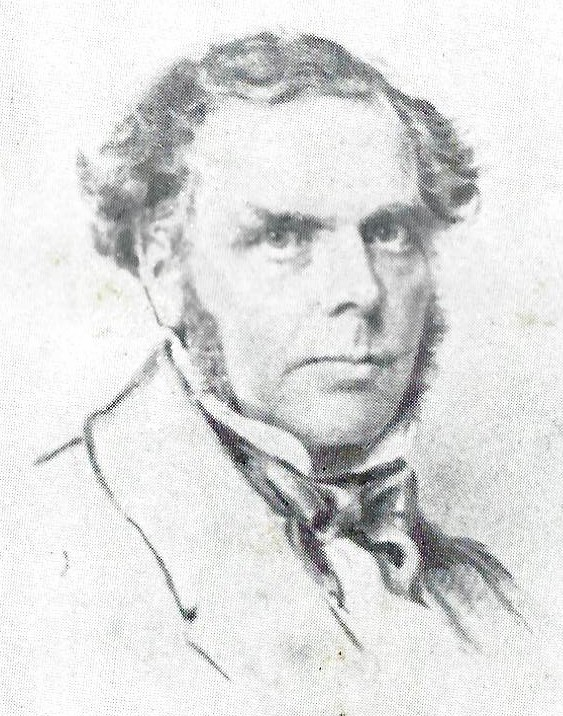
Dr Richard Barter

Having sought a site in central Dublin north of the River Liffey, Barter purchased the lease of a Georgian building in Upper Sackville Street known as Reynold’s Hotel. The Turkish baths were built on an extensive area at the rear. The renamed Hammam Hotel and Turkish Baths, opened on 17 March 1869.

The entrance hall opened into a galleried cooling-room and dressing rooms. Beyond were four suites of Turkish baths as well as other facilities. During the day the rooms were ventilated and lit by frosted or stained glass windows and skylights; at night they were lit by painted lamps and gasoliers.

"When the whole building is lighted up it has more the appearance of a scene in one of Scheherazade's beautiful tales than of a solid, bona fide brick and mortar business in the centre of a great city."

The hot rooms ranged from 120-230 degrees Fahrenheit and were heated by an underfloor hypocaust. There was a men’s smoking room with access to their baths through an arched corridor with ‘appropriate inscriptions, inculcating the excellence and importance of thorough cleanliness’ painted in ornamental letters on each arch. Adjoining the baths were separate coffee-rooms for men and women, with an ice-cream soda water apparatus which produced ‘eight different kinds of delicious drinks, to cool and refresh the bather’.

As with all Dr Barter's baths, apart from those at his St Ann’s hydro near Blarney, the day to day running of the establishment with its hotel staff and bath attendants was entrusted to a manager. At the Hammam this was James Walsh who had previously run Barter's Turkish baths at Bray.

Dr Barter died on 3 October 1870 and the Hammam, as part of his estate, passed to his eldest son, also named Richard.

== After Barter’s death ==
Richard’s main interest was in agriculture and the farm at St Ann's, but he ensured that the baths were well run and regularly improved. Within four months of taking over the Hammam an additional set of baths was opened. These adjoined the original ones, which were then redecorated and reserved for the use of women bathers.

The new baths were part of Dr Barter’s original plan and were much larger than the original ones. The cooling-room was 70 by 34 foot wide, and its 25 foot high ceiling allowed for fifty-five cubicles to be ranged around the room and on galleries above, each cubicle upholstered and curtained off. The carpeted room was furnished with seats and recliners. The main hot room was 60 by 30 foot, maintained between 120 and 150 degrees Fahrenheit; the smaller room between 180 and 200 degrees. There was also a cold plunge pool seventeen foot long by six foot wide, and a variety of showers. During its first three months, the new baths were catering for around 200 bathers each day.

Barter decided, as his father had done, to end direct ownership of his baths once they had become firmly established. Instead, they were leased to an independent proprietor. On 6 March 1874, Michael Duggan (previously Steward of the Agricultural Club) became the new proprietor, paying Barter £800 a year in rent.

Initially, Duggan seems to have managed the baths and hotel himself but, after the baths were refurbished in 1877, he appointed M H Williams as manager. Duggan died on 4 July 1881 and his son took over for a few months only. The rental agreement between Barter and Michael Duggan was 'for the term of Mr Duggan's life' and his son omitted to inform Barter of his father's death. Barter took Duggan Jnr to Court seeking to recover possession of the Hammam. Duggan claimed that a new letting had been made to him by virtue of Barter's acceptance of the rent, paid two days after his father's death. But the jury found for Barter on the basis that when he accepted the rent he was not aware that Duggan had died.

== The last years ==
Ten days after the end of the court case John North (previously manager of the County Galway Club) bought the hotel and baths, and retained Williams as baths manager for the next eight years.

North continued the practice of regular refurbishment and renewal. In August 1890, for example, he added a fourth shampooing-room, having earlier opened a separate set of second class baths for men. These had their own entrance in Thomas's Lane at the rear of the building. They were open from six in the morning till nine at night, and cost just sixpence.17

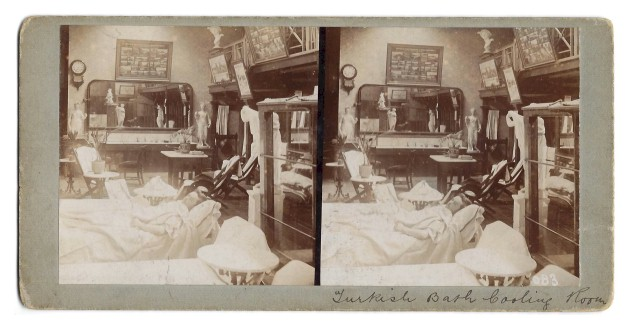
Part of the cooling-room in the Dublin Hammam using photographs taken by Alfred Seaman in July 1894

On 13 April 1892, North took a new lease on the hotel building and the two adjoining properties. This gave him the confidence to extend the business by the addition of public rooms which could be hired out. At the same time he installed electric lighting throughout the hotel and added a billiards room which was not only accessible from the hotel but also from the baths.

North, who for some years had been one of the two vice-presidents of the Hotel and Restaurant Proprietors Association of Ireland, died on 16 September 1910, and the Hammam, together with the Donegall Street Turkish Baths in Belfast, passed to his son-in-law, Joseph Armstrong.

The combined hotel and baths establishment now required a large staff to keep it running smoothly. Culinary historian Máirtín Mac Con Iomaire notes that the 1911 census shows that there were thirteen staff, including two female kitchen maids, living in at the hotel. Armstrong ( then 45 years old) and his family lived at the adjoining number 11 Sackville Street, together with twenty members of staff. These included another two kitchen maids and two domestics, Annie Bryant (aged 40) and Mary Power (aged 36). There were also two female and three male bath attendants who lived at the Hammam. This would be in addition to an unknown number of staff who did not live in.

The baths continued running smoothly during the next few years, but the Easter Rising of 1916 interrupted its peaceful existence. The GPO (General Post Office), standing almost opposite the Hammam, became the headquarters of the Irish Volunteers and was soon bombarded by the British. The GPO, and other buildings on that side of the street, caught fire, while the Hammam and buildings on their side were effectively under siege.

After the Rising was defeated few improvements were made to the Hammam. Britain was in the middle of the WWI, and in Ireland there was increasing tension between the various military and political factions which soon culminated in the Irish Civil War (June 1922-May 1923).

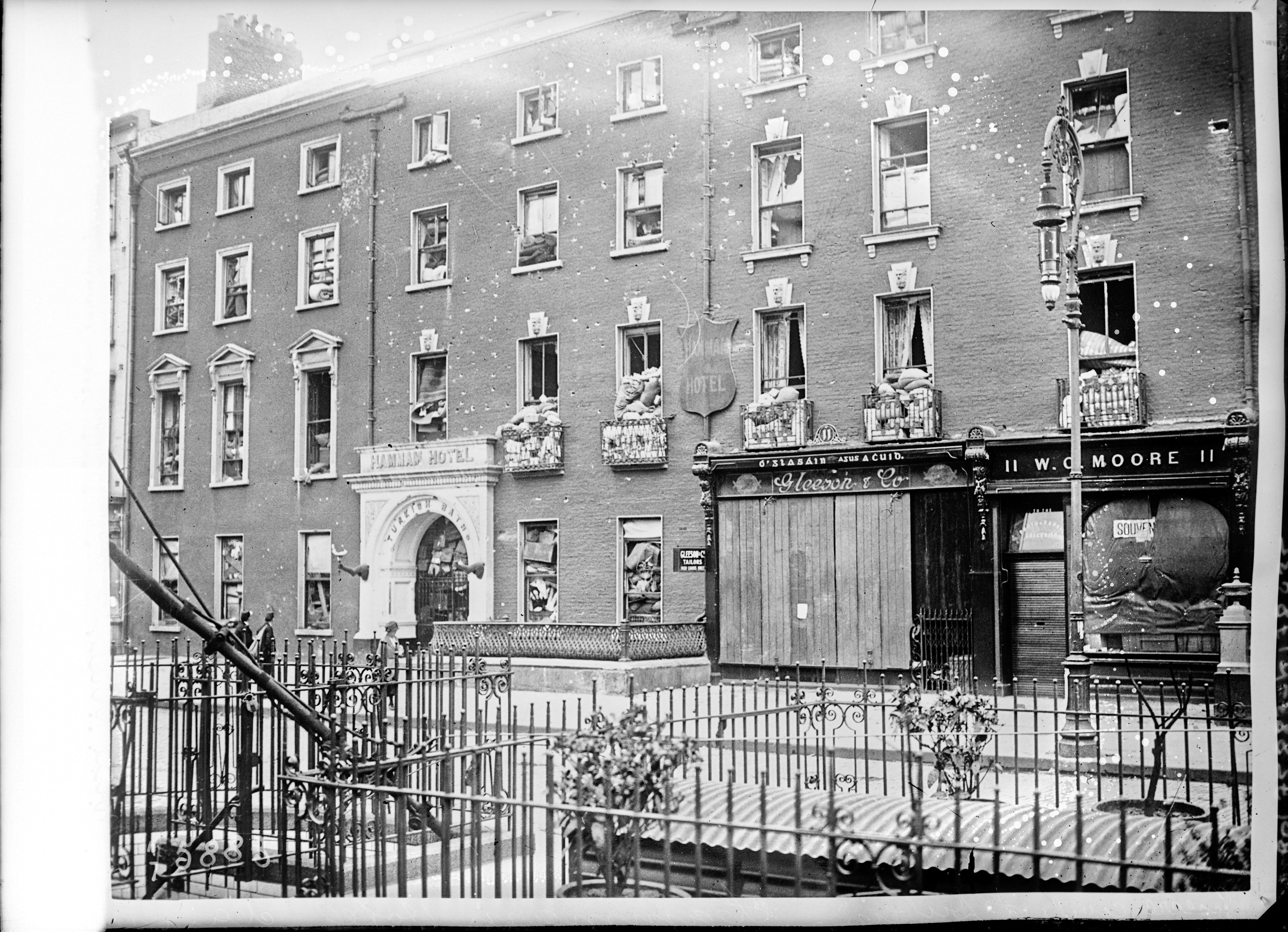
The Hammam with broken and sandbagged windows, shortly before its destruction during the Civil War

In 1922, six years after the Rising, it was right at the centre of the fighting in O'Connell Street, with shots being fired from both sides of the street. The Hammam was a major target, and was rapidly destroyed. Two years after the fire, Joseph Armstrong, as lessee of the Hammam, claimed £36,632 for the destruction of the hotel and Turkish baths attached, £9,982 for furniture and fittings, and £511 for his stock. The Recorder of Dublin granted the claims for the building and stock, but reduced the amount available for furniture to £7,000.23 He also attached a full reinstatement clause. (Note: This was a clause in the post-war Damage to Property (Compensation) Bill of 1923 which stated that if a building destroyed during the fighting was normally used for business or trade and contributed economically to the area, then the full cost of replacing it had to be awarded.)

Although the hotel and baths had been in the family for 35 years, Armstrong decided to concentrate of his Belfast baths in Donegall Street. The site was put up for public auction. The Hammam was never rebuilt after it was destroyed. Offices and shops now stand on the site, their only connection with Barter's baths is the name—Hammam Buildings.
