= Dublin Dental University Hospital =

- Health Service Executive
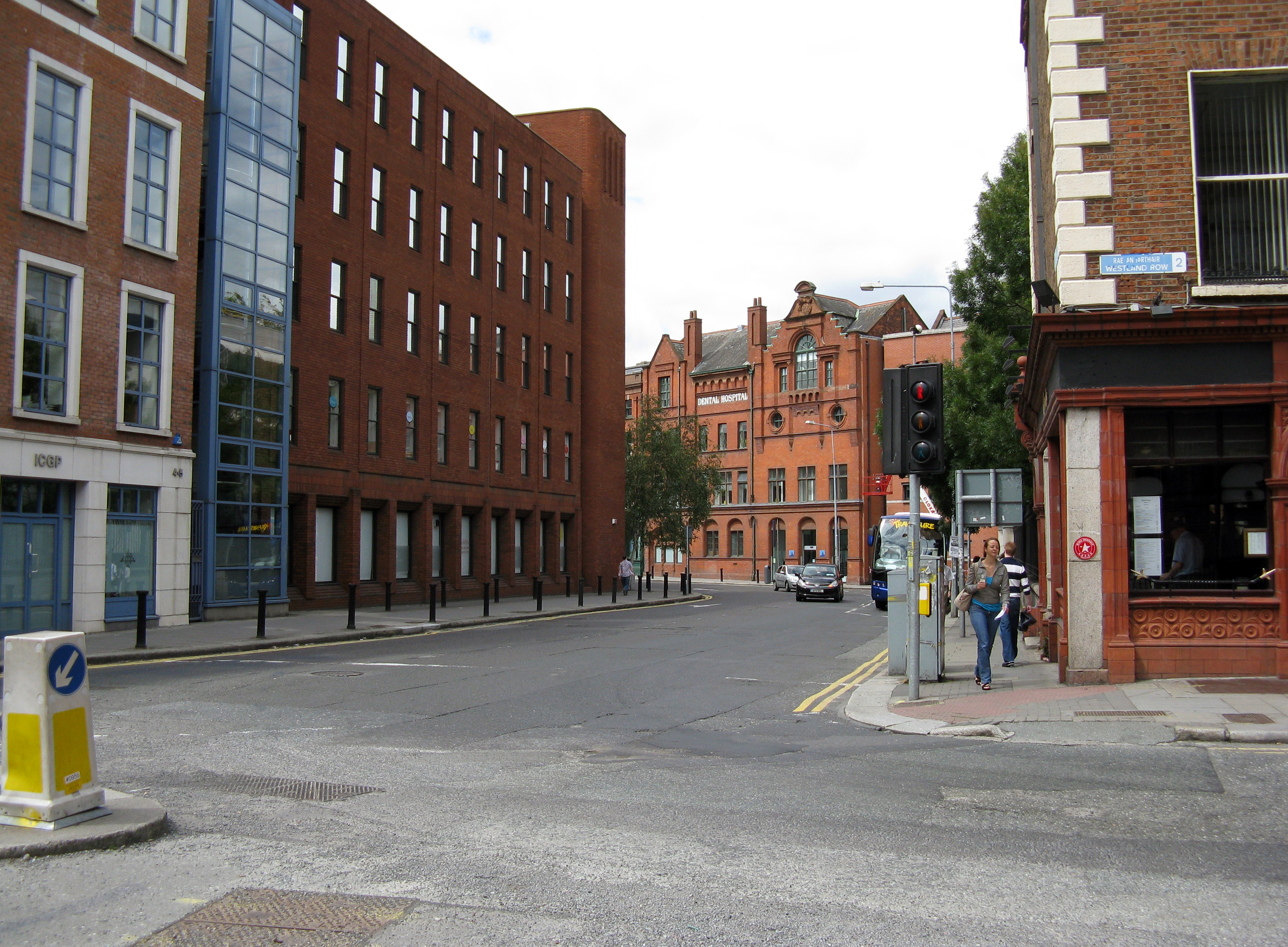
- Dublin Dental University Hospital

- Shown in Dublin

Geography
- Location: Lincoln Place, Dublin, Ireland
- Coordinates: 53.3422°N 6.2521°W

Organisation
- Care system: HSE
- Type: Specialist

Services
- Speciality: Dental

History
- Founded: 1879

Links
- Website: www.dentalhospital.ie

Dublin Dental University Hospital (Irish: Ospidéal Déadach Ollscoile Átha Cliath) is a dental health and teaching facility at Lincoln Place, Dublin, Ireland. The Dublin Dental University Hospital is located on the Trinity College Dublin campus. It is the predominant teaching hospital for dentistry in Ireland, where undergraduate and graduate dental students, dental nursing students, dental technicians, and dental hygienists are all educated. Trinity College Dublin's Dental School resides at Dublin Dental University Hospital.

== History ==
The facility was established in a building off St Stephen's Green in 1879. It moved to a purpose-built building in Lincoln Place in 1895. The functions of the hospital were confirmed by The Dublin Dental Hospital (Establishment) Order 1963. (Note: The Dublin Dental Hospital (Establishment) Order, 1963, sets out the functions of the hospital including: (a) to take over the property of the Incorporated Dental Hospital of Ireland, (b) to conduct, maintain and manage a hospital for the affording of treatment and appliances to persons and (c) to co-operate with the authorities of University College, Dublin, Trinity College, Dublin, and the Royal College of Surgeons in Ireland in the teaching and training of students of dentistry and dental surgery.)

Since the 1990s, the Trinity College School of Dental Science, established by amalgamating the dental schools of Trinity College Dublin, University College Dublin and the Royal College of Surgeons in Ireland, has been based in the hospital. The hospital was extended in 1998 and again in 2010, in the latter case with a four-storey atrium exhibiting a sculpture by Fergus Martin.

Little, if any, original research was conducted at the Hospital before 1980. The facility employs a dental team of about 250 people in total.

== Services ==
The Dublin Dental University Hospital provides secondary and tertiary services in the areas of Oral and Maxillofacial Surgery, Oral Medicine, Oral Pathology, Oral Radiology, Oral Mycology, Orthodontics, Paediatric Dentistry, Special Care Dentistry, Endodontics, Restorative Dentistry, Implantology, Endodontics, Periodontology, Prosthodontics, Sleep Apnoea, Maxillofacial Prosthodontics Restorative Oncology, Special Needs Restorative Dentistry and dental care to Medically Compromised patients.
