= Victorian Turkish baths, Dublin, Lincoln Place =

Former Victorian building in Dublin, Ireland

Turkish Baths, Lincoln Place
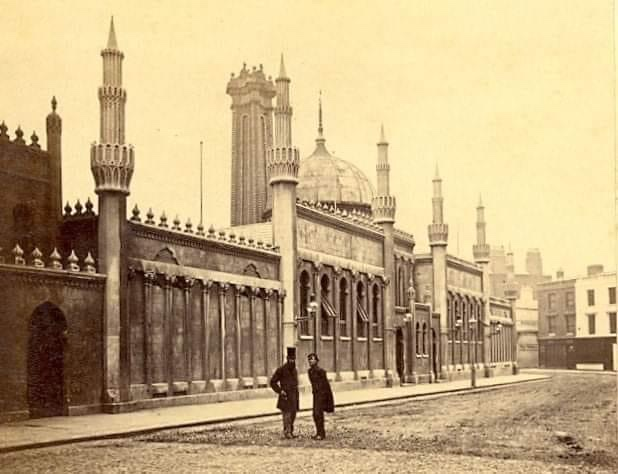
- A photograph of the baths circa 1860-70.

General information
- Type: Victorian Turkish baths
- Classification: Demolished
- Location: Lincoln Place, Dublin, Dublin, Ireland
- Coordinates: 53.341985°N 6.251095°W
- Construction started: 1858
- Completed: 1860
- Opened: 2 February 1860

Design and construction
- Architect: Richard Barter (sculptor)
- Developer: Richard Barter (physician)
- Other designers: James Hogan & Son (Plasterers)
- Quantity surveyor: Dwyer (Clerk of works)
- Main contractor: Meade (Builder)

The Victorian Turkish baths, Dublin, Lincoln Place, were the first purpose-built Victorian Turkish baths in the Irish capital, opening on 2 February 1860.

In 1867 the company leased the baths to Richard Bushe, a magistrate who lived on the premises. By 1881 he had sold them to the hoteliers Millar & Jury who already owned Turkish baths at 127 Stephen's Green West, adjacent to their hotel.

In June 1900 the baths were unsuccessfully offered at auction as a going concern. The building was then used for offices and other commercial activities before being demolished in 1970.

== History ==
=== Design and construction ===
The Lincoln Place baths opened on 2 February 1860 having been developed by the physician Richard Barter for the Turkish Bath Company of Dublin Limited, which was founded in 1859.

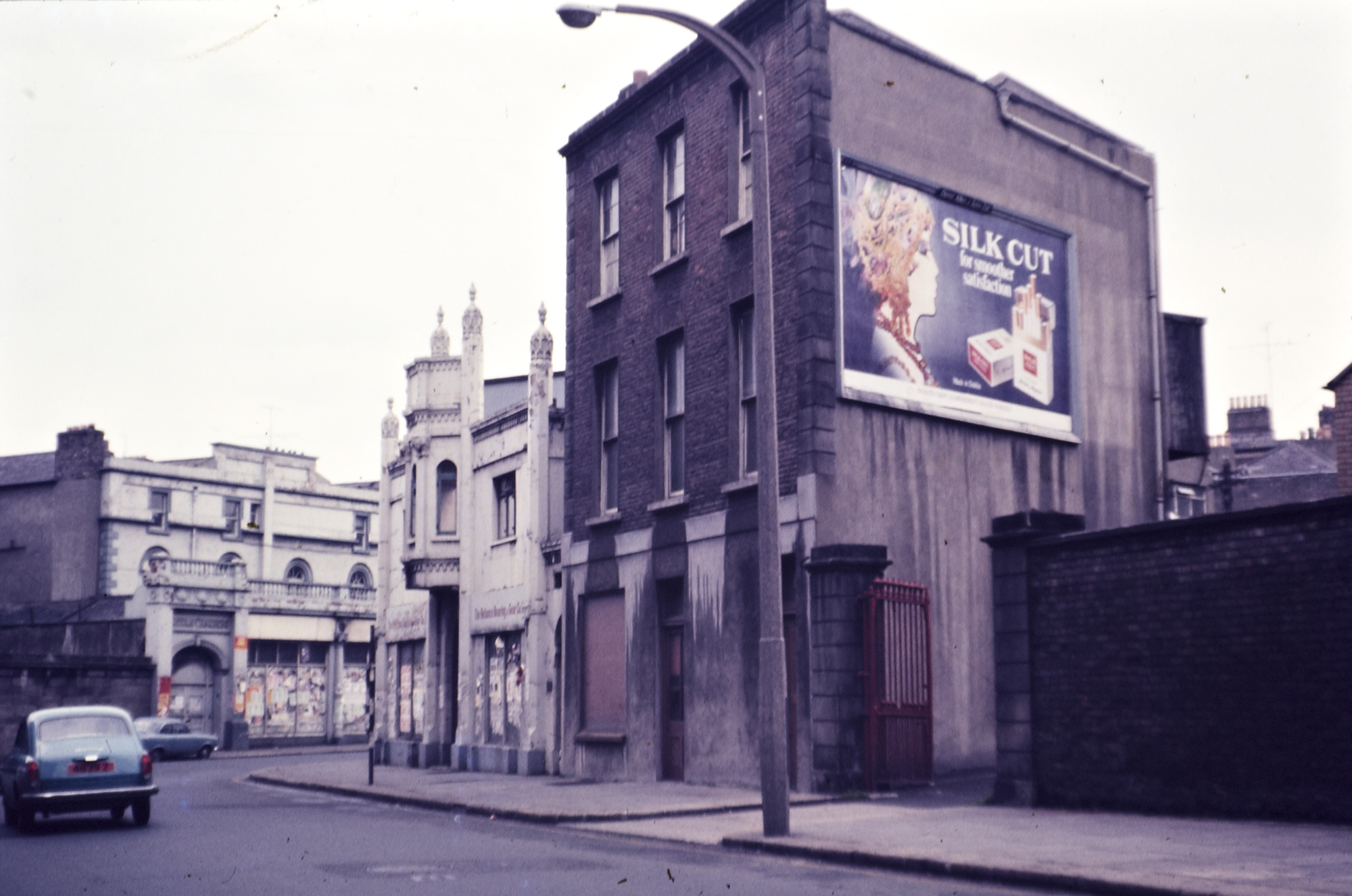
Centre-left of image, with pseudo-minarets, is the western corner of the baths which housed a restaurant.

Designed by the sculptor and architect Richard Barter, the building was well received by the Dublin Builder, which praised Irish builders (mainly from Cork) for executing the unusual design so well. They noted particularly the elaborate plaster decoration on the façade carried out by Hogan & Sons of nearby Great Brunswick Street. The main frontage was 186 feet long. At the rear of the building, there was a bathing area for horses and other animals. A very prominent feature was the 50 foot high ogee-shaped dome which sat above the company board room. On either side of a central ticket office were separate bathing areas for men and women. The interior featured "oriental arches and coloured bricks" and the floors were fitted with patterned tiles from Mintons.

=== Operations and trading ===
Initially trading was very successful; it has been calculated that the baths served 90 bathers a day during their first 4 years of operation.

There was an adjoining restaurant on the western corner of the building which was leased out to a succession of proprietors and was originally known as the Café de Paris, the first documented French restaurant in Dublin.

The bath attendants wore red dressing gowns and Turkish slippers, and served coffee and a chibouk to patrons relaxing after their bath.

Dr Barter left the business by 1867, and later opened Victorian Turkish baths known as The Hammam on Sackville Street on 17 March 1869. The baths at Lincoln Place were subsequently refurbished in 1867, and again in 1875 in two phases. The works in 1875 saw the installation of modern showers and a plunge bath. With competition from The Hammam and new baths on St Stephen's Green, the Lincoln Place baths went into liquidation in 1880 and were offered for sale by tender. They were purchased by the owners of the St Stephen's Green baths, Millar and Jury, and were modernised further.

John Curran, previously Dr Barter's manager at Bray, moved to Lincoln Place in 1881 where he was manager until his death in 1886.

After a series of events including an 1881 court case for negligence, Millar and Jury sold the baths in 1900.

=== Closure and demolition ===
After the bathing establishment closed, the building was used for a number of commercial purposes before being demolished in 1970.

== In popular culture ==
The baths are mentioned in James Joyce's Ulysses, where Leopold Bloom refers to them as "the mosque of the baths".
