= Gustavus Hume =

Surgeon from Ireland

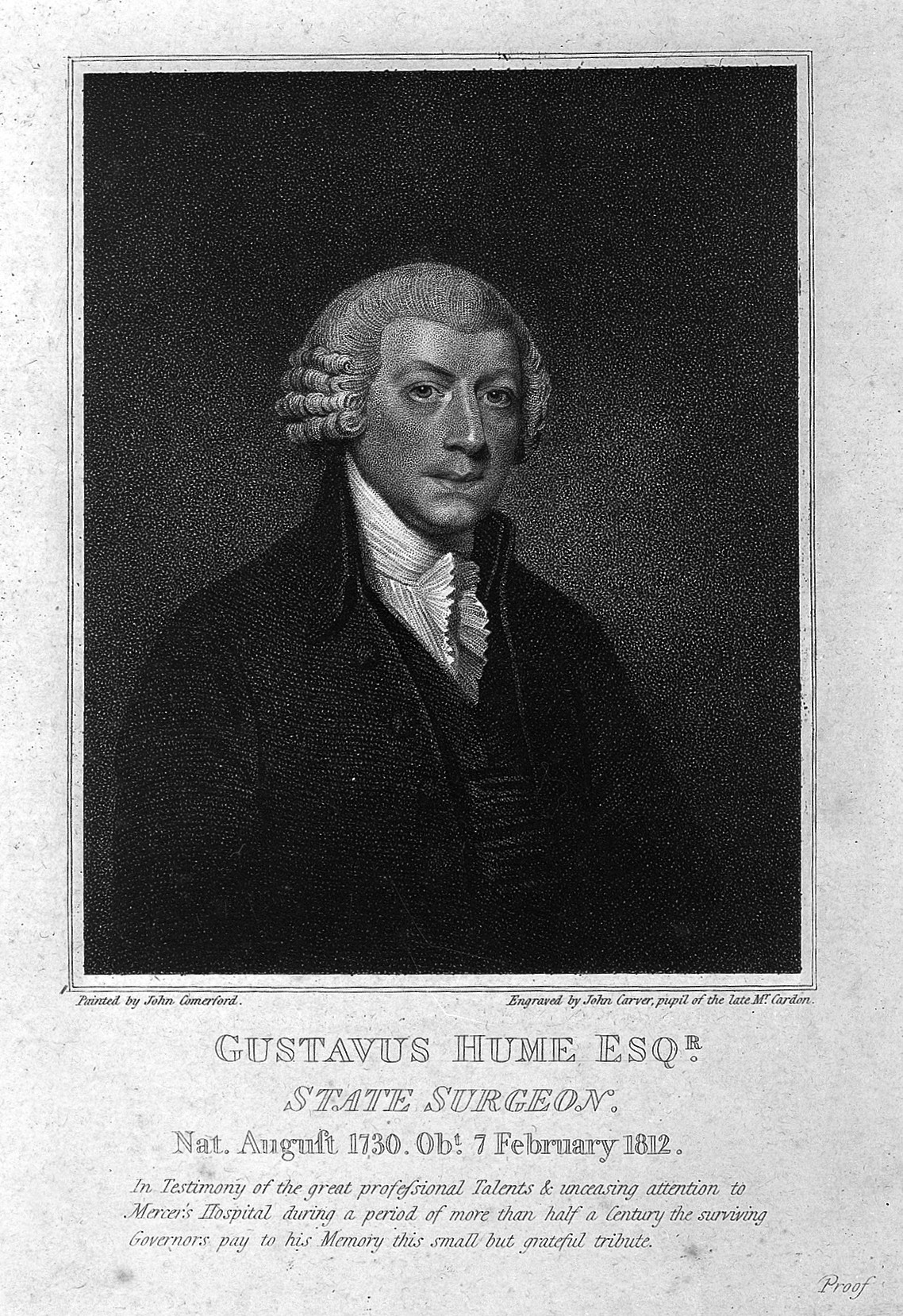
- Born: 1730; Kingdom of Great Britain
- Died: 7 February 1812 (aged 81–82); Dublin, Ireland
- Occupation: Surgeon

Gustavus Hume (1730 – 7 February 1812) was the president of the Royal College of Surgeons in Ireland (RCSI) in the first part of 1795. He specialised in the diseases of children. He was one of the surgeons who examined the body of the journalist William Jackson after he died from poisoning in a Dublin court in 1795 while awaiting sentencing for high treason.

== Early life and family ==
Gustavus Hume was born in 1730 to a family of Scottish origin, some of whom settled in Ireland in the seventeenth century. His father was Robert, and his grandfather was Thomas Hume, of Humewood, County Wicklow, who was an ancestor of the Irish Conservative politician William Wentworth Fitzwilliam Hume-Dick.

One of Hume's sons was the physician Thomas Hume (c. 1769–1850) and his great grandson was Lieutenant Colonel Sir Gustavus Hume (1826–1891) who served in the British Army during the Crimean War.

== Career ==
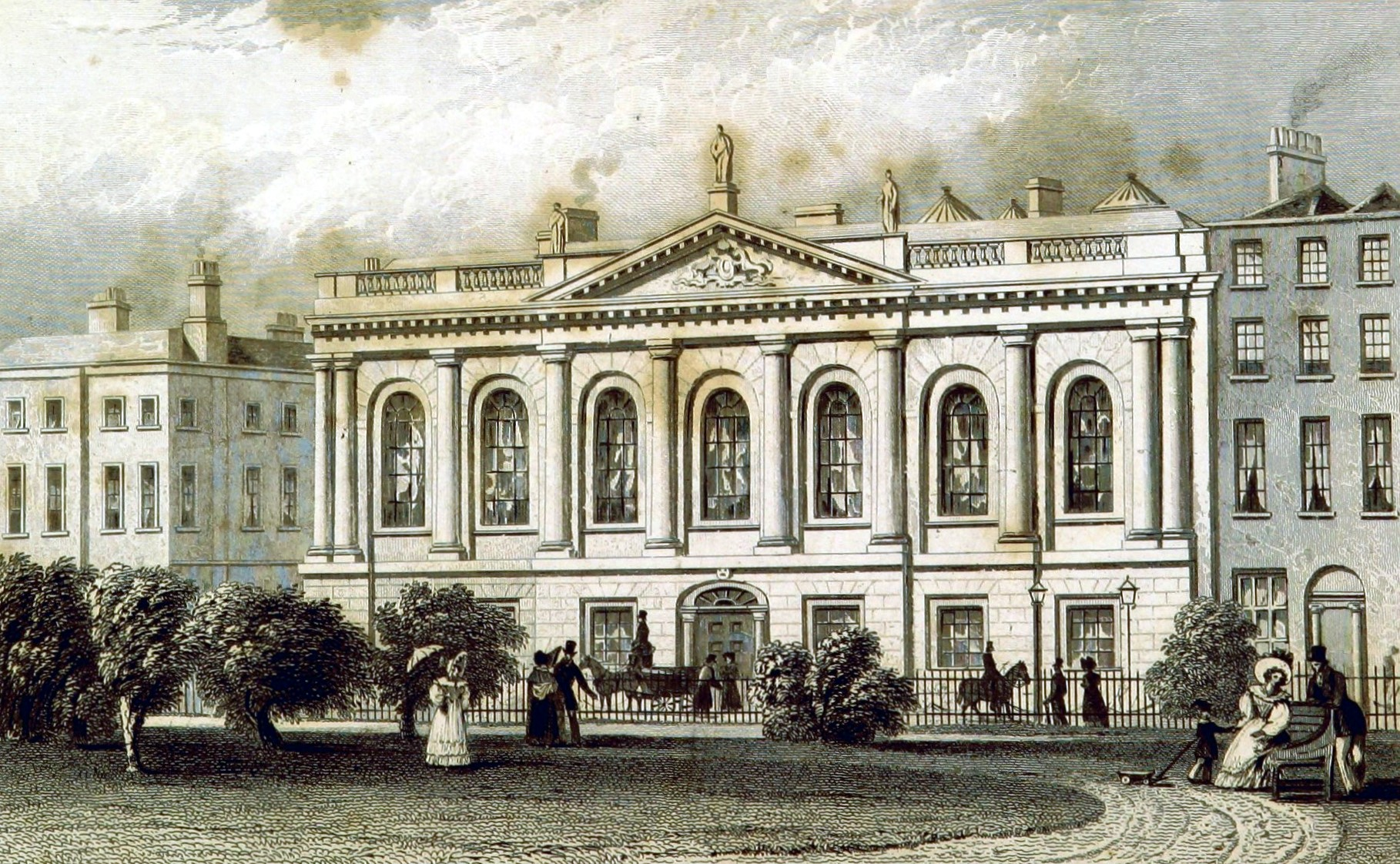
"The College of Surgeons, Dublin". 1837.

It is not known to which physician Hume was apprenticed. In 1758, he was living in Longford Street, Dublin, when he was appointed surgeon to the Mercer's Hospital. He developed a successful practice and specialised in the diseases of children. He liked to prescribe oatmeal porridge and as a result received the nickname "Stirabout Gusty" which was referred to in William Norcott's The Metropolis as follows:

"H-me, twice as ancient as the College Charter,
Scours Death with Stir-a-bout from ev'ry quarter."

Hume was one of 49 physicians and chirurgeons who declared their public support for the construction of a Publick Bath in Dublin in May 1771 and named Achmet Borumborad as a well qualified individual for carrying such a scheme into existence.

Hume was an early member of the Board of Examiners for Surgeons to County Infirmaries. He did not join the Dublin Society of Surgeons, but was one of the censors named in the first charter of the Royal College of Surgeons of Ireland. In 1791, he and Clement Archer jointly became State Surgeon in succession to John Neill.

Together with Dr Adrien, Hume examined the body of the journalist William Jackson in the dock of the King's Bench, Christ Church, on May Day 1795, after Jackson died from poisoning while awaiting sentencing for high treason.

Hume was president of the RCSI only from January to 4 May 1795, resigning on that date for reasons that are unknown but which Cameron writes probably related to the case of the former member of the society, Frederick Drury, who was expelled for giving false testimony in court. Drury sued for reinstatement and failed but significant legal costs were incurred which the society tried to recover from Drury. Vice President Clement Archer was elected in Hume's place.

Hume's medical writings were on the subjects of the diseases of children, angina pectoris, cowpox, and gout.

== Building ==
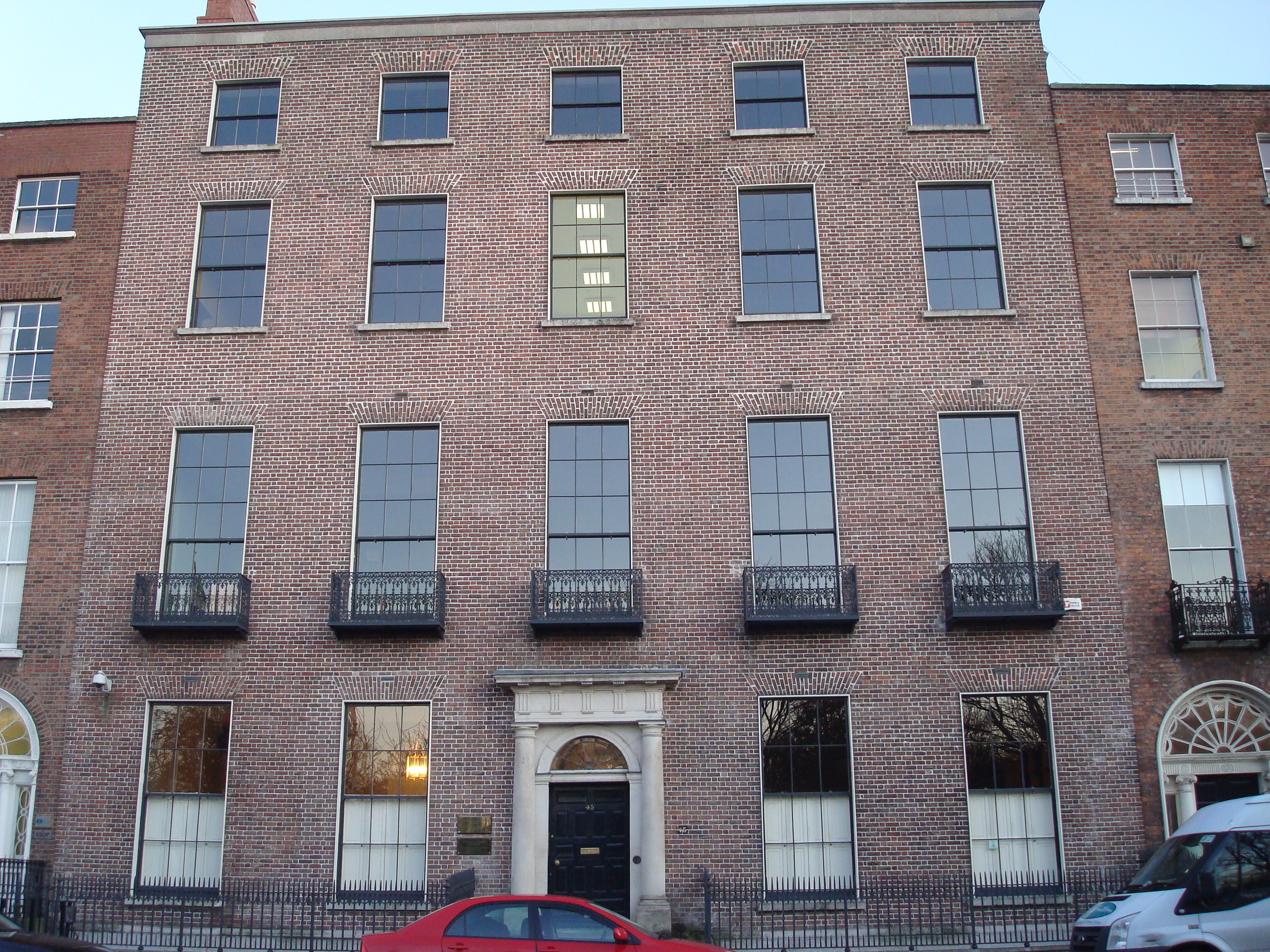
Hume's former home at 45 Merrion Square now housing the Irish Architectural Archive.

Hume built a number of houses. In 1770, he built number 5 Ely Row (previously Hume Row).

He built a mansion in Merrion Square to a design by Samuel Sproule, which was later divided into two large houses, in one of which Sir John Banks, physician to Queen Victoria, lived. The building has since been converted back into a single property and houses the Irish Architectural Archive.

He built a home for himself at 63 Dawson Street in which he died. In 1775, John Gilborne wrote of Hume:

"Gustavus Hume in Surgery excels,
Yet Pride of Merit ne'er his Bosom swells;
He adds to Dublin every Year a Street,
Where Citizens converse and friendly meet."

== Death ==
Hume died on 7 February 1812.
