= Gustavus Hume (British Army officer) =

Sir Gustavus Hume
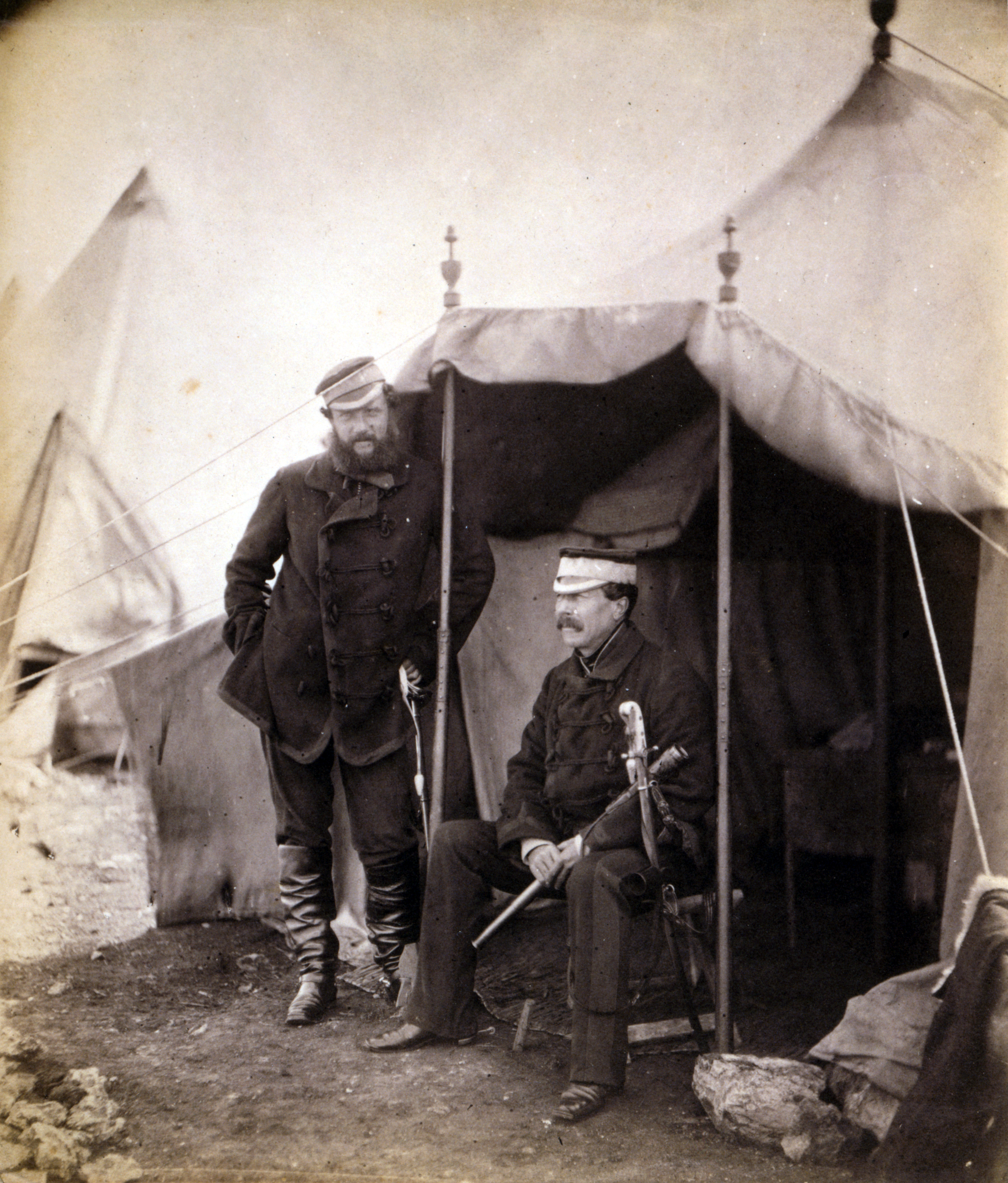
- Sir John Campbell and his aide-de-camp Captain Hume, (standing) by Roger Fenton, 1855
- Born: 25 February 1826
- Died: 16 June 1891 (aged 65)
- Military career
- Branch: British Army
- Rank: Lieutenant-Colonel
- Conflicts: Crimean War (Battle of the Alma, Battle of Inkerman, Siege of Sevastopol), Indian Mutiny (Siege of Lucknow)

Lieutenant-Colonel Sir Gustavus Hume (25 February 1826 – 16 June 1891) was a soldier in the British Army who served during the Crimean War (1854–56) and the Indian Rebellion of 1857. He took part in the Battle of the Alma, during which he was wounded, the Battle of Inkerman, the Siege of Sebastopol, and others. He was present at the Siege of Lucknow during the mutiny. He was later adjutant and lieutenant of the Queen's Body Guard of the Honourable Corps of Gentlemen at Arms. He was knighted by Queen Victoria in 1880.

== Early life and family ==
Hume was born on 25 February 1826, the second son of the Reverend Robert Hume of Dublin (died 1849).

He was the grandson of the Irish physician Thomas Hume (c. 1769 – 1850) and the great grandson of the surgeon Gustavus Hume (1732–1812).

== Career ==
Hume became an ensign with the 38th Regiment of Foot of the British Army on 30 May 1843. He became a captain in 1852. He served throughout the Crimean War and was present at the Battle of the Alma, during which he was wounded, the Battle of Inkerman, the Siege of Sebastopol, and the expedition to Kertsch. He was aide-de-camp to Major General Sir John Campbell and was present during the assault on the Great Redan at Sebastopol in June 1855 in which Campbell was killed. He served during the Indian Mutiny in 1857 and was present at the Siege of Lucknow (1858) and at the campaign in Oude.

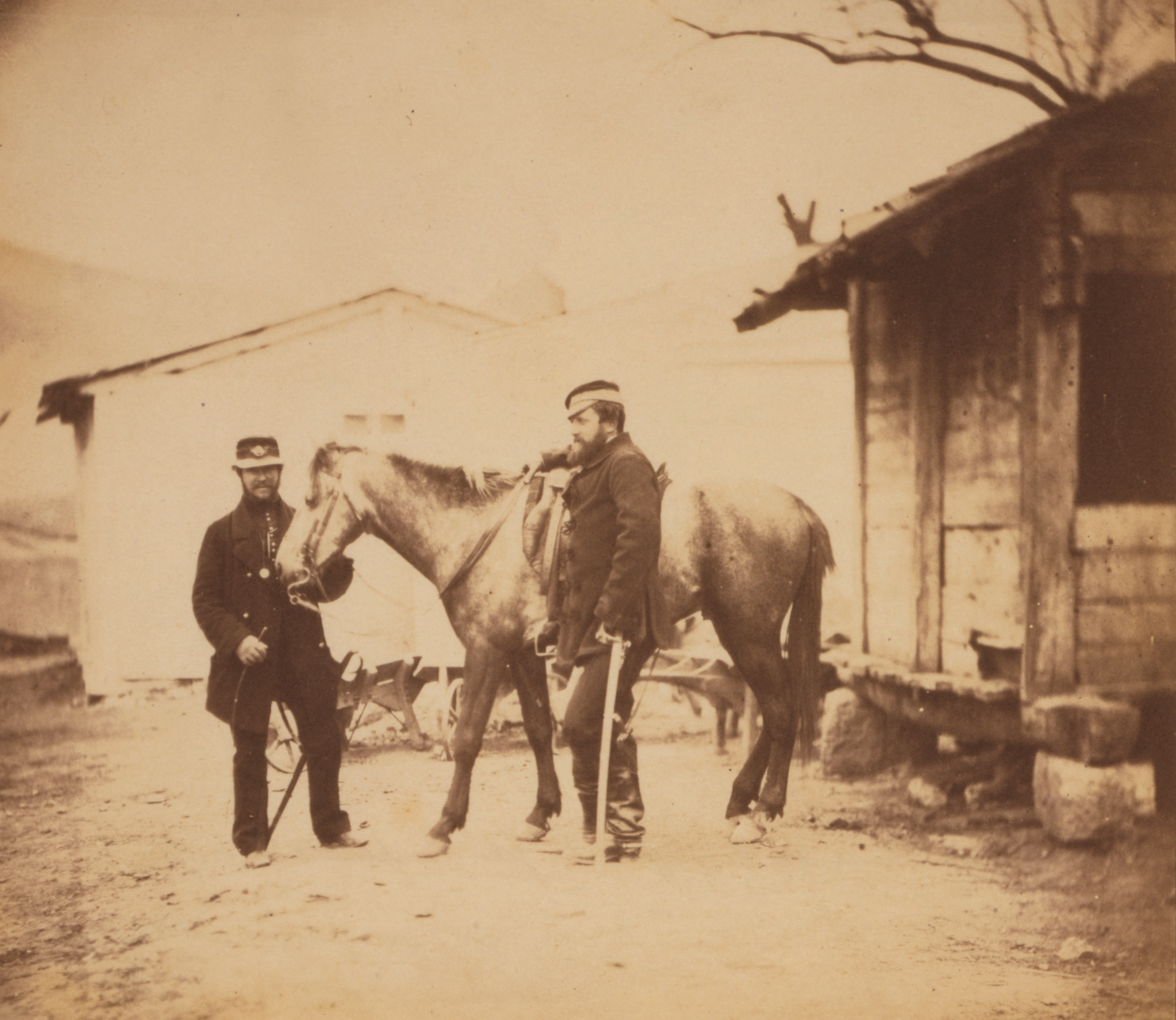
"Captain Hume on the staff of Sir John Campbell & his brother", Roger Fenton, 1855

He was assistant inspector of volunteers from 1860 to 1865 and promoted to lieutenant colonel in March 1863. He entered the Honourable Corps of Gentlemen at Arms in December 1872. He was made Clerk of the Cheque and Adjutant of the Corps of Gentlemen in January 1876, and lieutenant of the Corps in November 1878. He was knighted by Queen Victoria at Windsor Castle in December 1880. He was also a chevalier of the Legion of Honour.

== Death and legacy ==
Hume died at 21 Royal York Crescent, Clifton, on 16 June 1891. He left an estate of £226. His will was proved by his widow, Ellen Caroline Hume. His diary from 18 July 1857 to 30 April 1858 while serving with the 38th Regiment of Foot during the Indian Mutiny is held by the National Army Museum. It includes his account of the relief of Lucknow.
