= Archibald Richardson (surgeon) =

Archibald Richardson was the first State Surgeon of Ireland in 1774.

Richardson was one of 49 physicians and chirurgeons who declared their public support for the construction of a Publick Bath in Dublin in May 1771 and named Achmet Borumborad as a well qualified individual for carrying such a scheme into existence.
