= John Whiteway =

John Whiteway may refer to:

- John Whiteway (politician)
- John Whiteway (surgeon)
