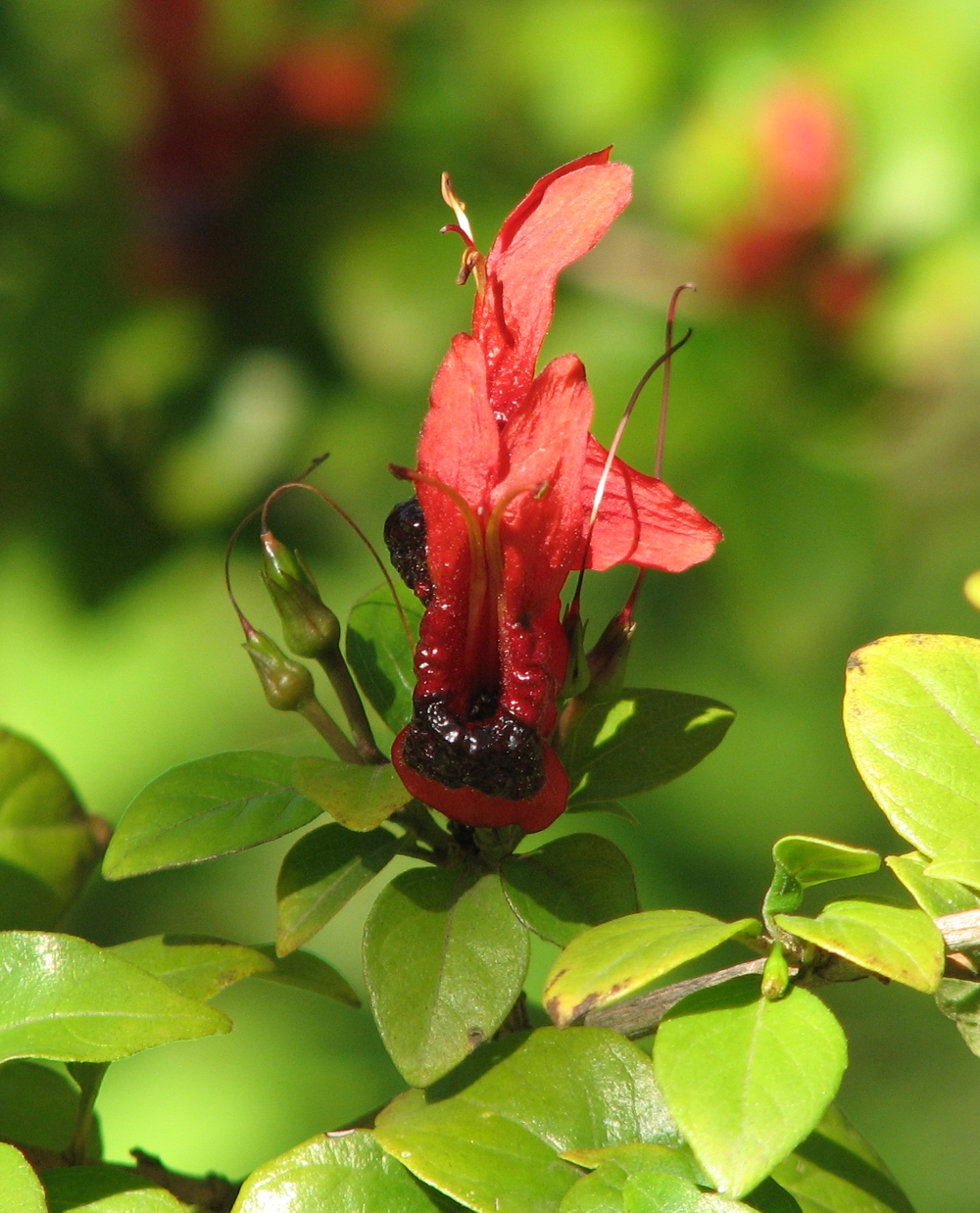

Scientific classification
- Kingdom: Plantae
- Clade: Tracheophytes
- Clade: Angiosperms
- Clade: Eudicots
- Clade: Asterids
- Order: Lamiales
- Family: Acanthaceae
- Genus: Ruttya
- Species: R. fruticosa

Binomial name
- Ruttya fruticosa Lindau

= Ruttya fruticosa =

Jammy mouth

Species of shrub

Ruttya fruticosa, also known as jammy mouth or jêmbekkie, is a shrub which is native to Africa. It can be found in South Somalia to Tanzania and in the woodlands of Dhofar, Oman. The name Ruttya was named in honour of Dr John Rutty and fruticosa means shrubby and refers to the habit of the plant.

== Seasonal blooming ==
The flower blooms usually bloom during late spring/early summer, mid summer, and late summer/early fall. This plant is attractive to bees, butterflies, and birds. It has average water needs. In addition, it requires a pH range 6.1 to 6.5 (mildly acidic). They have a varying colour, ranging from orange to dark pink/violet.

== Uses ==
The flowers of Ruttya fruiticosa used to be pulled off and sucked to extract the sweet nectar. The twigs were used to make kohl sticks and wedge-shaped dividers, which women used to part and plait hair.

This plant was also used as fodder for cattle and cattle, especially camels and goats. The flowers of the Ruttya fruitcosa are also an important bee forage

== Description ==
Height: 4–6 ft. (1.2-1.8 m)

Spacing: 36–48 in. (90–120 cm)

Hardiness: USDA Zone 8a: to -12.2 °C (10 °F)
USDA Zone 8b: to -9.4 °C (15 °F)
USDA Zone 9a: to -6.6 °C (20 °F)
USDA Zone 9b: to -3.8 °C (25 °F)
USDA Zone 10a: to -1.1 °C (30 °F)
USDA Zone 10b: to 1.7 °C (35 °F)
USDA Zone 11: above 4.5 °C (40 °F)
