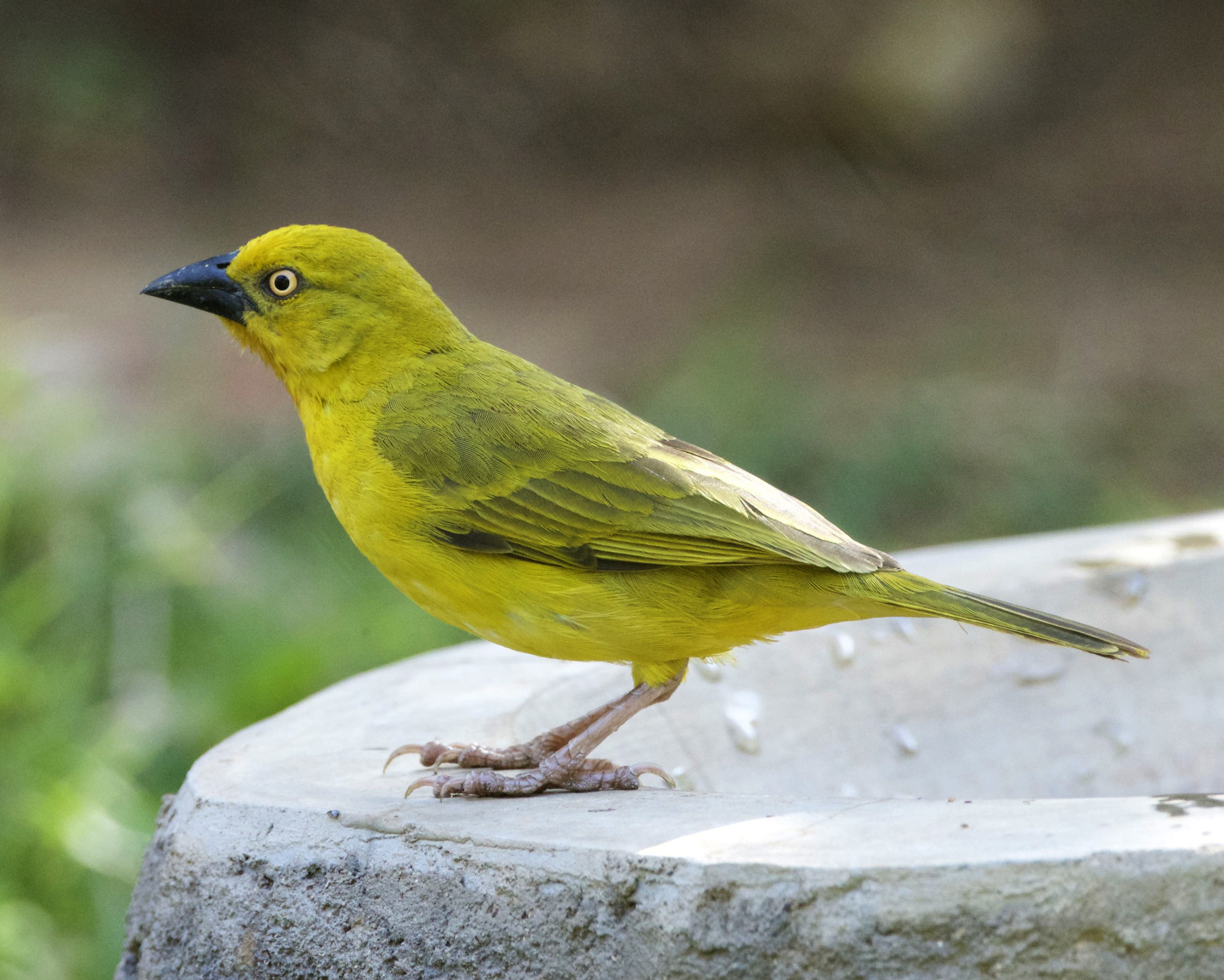

Conservation status
- Least Concern (IUCN 3.1)

Scientific classification
- Kingdom: Animalia
- Phylum: Chordata
- Class: Aves
- Order: Passeriformes
- Family: Ploceidae
- Genus: Ploceus
- Species: P. xanthops

Binomial name
- Ploceus xanthops (Hartlaub, 1862)

= Holub's golden weaver =

Species of bird

Holub's golden weaver (Ploceus xanthops), also known as the African golden weaver, is a species of bird in the family Ploceidae. The common name commemorates the Czech naturalist Emil Holub. It is found from Gabon to Uganda and Kenya, south to northern Namibia, northern Botswana and eastern South Africa. They have a yellow on their heads and light yellow eyes. They live for four years. Their usual call sounds like "chichi-chichi-chi-squirr ski-wee" but there is some variation from regions so some contact calls are a short "chirp.

== Description ==
Males differentiate from the females because of their full yellow heads, bright greenish-yellow body and the bit of orange under their chins that continues to the upper breast. The coloring on the females are duller and they only have the yellow coloring on the forehead. The males and the females share several similar characteristics, dull brown wings on the upper portion and then the lower portion having a yellow coloring. As they have light yellow eyes, black bills and pink legs. When the birds are younger they are a dull olive color with only the tail, chin and throat having the yellow coloring. Their eyes are dark brown and their bill is a pale brown.

== Distribution and habitat ==
They live in seventeen countries which are Angola, Botswana, Burundi, Congo, The Democratic Republic of the Congo, Eswatini, Gabon, Kenya, Malawi, Mozambique, Namibia, Rwanda, South Africa, United Republic of Tanzania, Uganda, Zambia and Zimbabwe. They live in areas that are inland from freshwater which includes forests, savannas, shrublands, grasslands, and wetlands. They cover a range of different habitats which includes bushy areas with tall grass. They can also be found on forest margins or the side of a stream. From East South Africa to West Angola they can be found on the coast. There is not much research so they are assumed to be sedentary. They live at elevations of 1,200 to 2,300 meters. They do not migrate for seasons and the furthest distance recorded was ten kilometers.

== Behavior and ecology ==
=== Diet ===
The Holub's Golden Weaver is omnivorous and eats a diet of invertebrate fruits, seed and nectar. The insects include beetle larvae, termites, grasshoppers, praying mantis, tabanid flies and spiders. The fruit includes guavas, figs and rhus pyroides. The seeds of grass and exocite pins along with the nectar of ruttya and erythrina. They will sometimes eat the petals of flowers as well.

=== Breeding ===
They are monogamous couples that breed anytime between the months of January–April but they start as early as September in South Africa, Zambia and Malawi. Breeding happens in colonies of two to three territorial males. Male birds perch beside a female, make specific movements and sing a song stretch (song that changes the speed or duration of an audio signal without affecting its pitch). The males build the nest that is two to two and a half meters up from tall bushes or reeds. Usually this is done over water and the females make the lining. Researchers have also found old nests from Brown Firefinch, White-collared Oliveback and Zebra Waxbill. They lay clutches of eggs that range from one to three that range from being a solid pink, blue or white to having red and lilac freckles. The incubation time is fourteen to fifteen days and after hatching they spend nineteen to twenty two days in the nest where they are fed by both parents.

== Status and conservation ==
As of 2024 they are not globally threatened. They are much less abundant than colonial species but the population trends are stable and they live over large areas so they are not considered vulnerable to extinction. Present in protected areas throughout its range. There is no research on the number of mature individuals in the wild right now.
