= State Surgeon =

State Surgeon may refer to:

- State Surgeon of Ireland
- State Surgeon General, in United States
