= Sir John Campbell, 2nd Baronet =

British army officer (1807–1855)

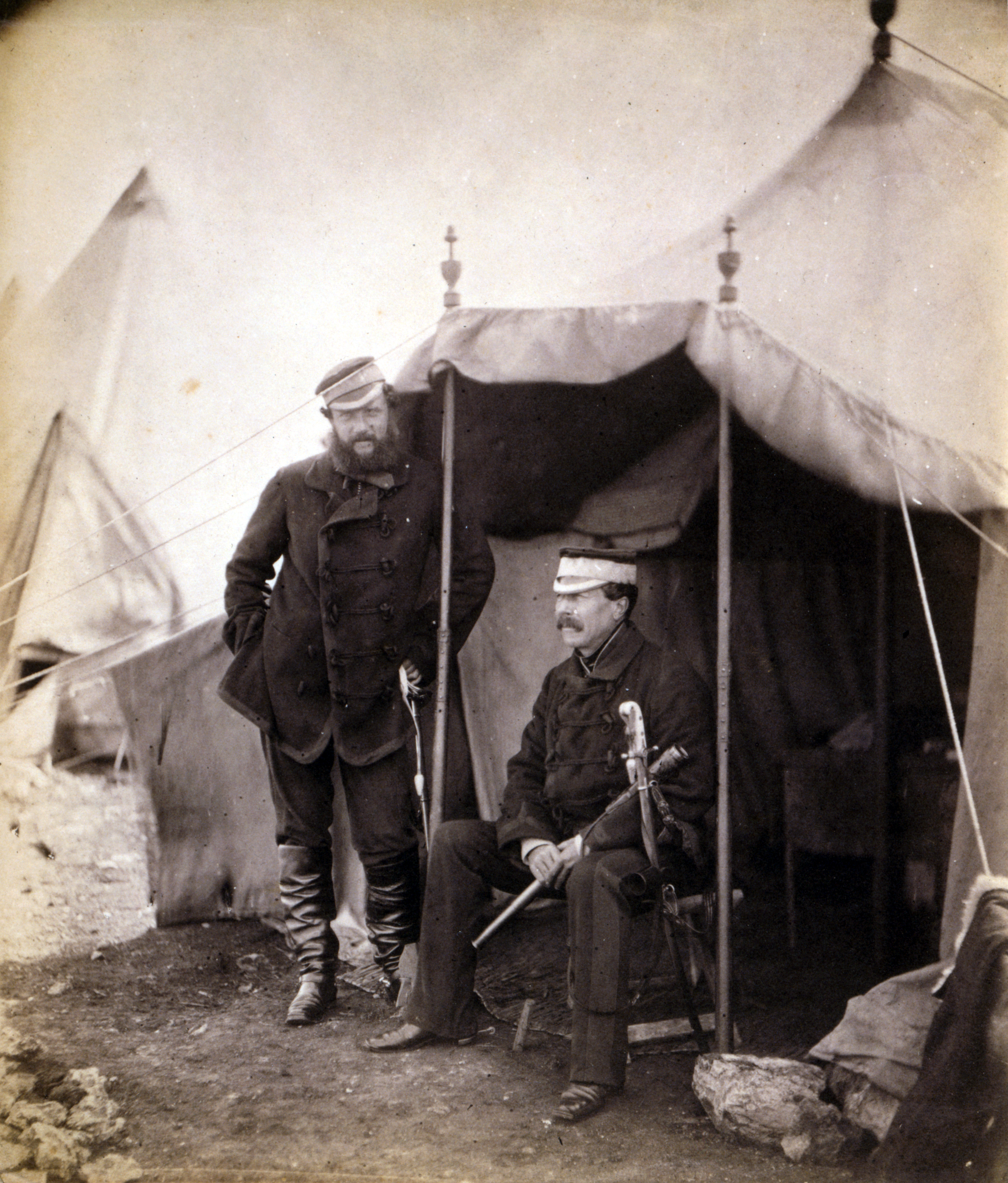
Captain Hume and Sir John Campbell (seated), Crimea War, Photo by Roger Fenton, Library of Congress

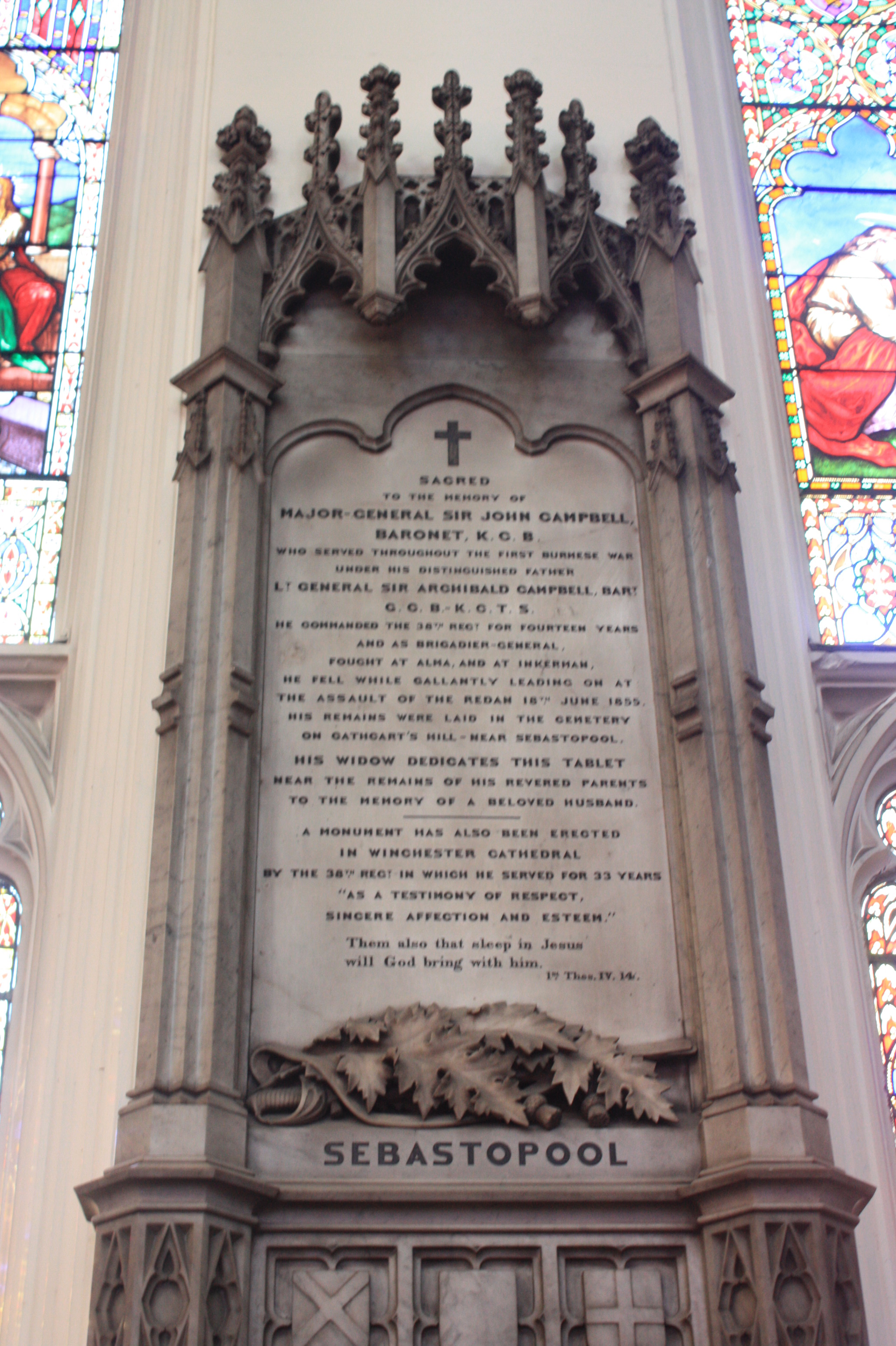
Memorial to Major General Sir John Campbell, St Johns Episcopal Church, Edinburgh

Major-General Sir John Campbell, 2nd Baronet (14 April 1807 – 18 June 1855), was a British army officer and the son of General Sir Archibald Campbell, 1st Baronet. He died in the Battle of the Great Redan.

== Early life ==
John Campbell was born on 14 April 1807, the second son of General Sir Archibald Campbell, 1st Baronet,(1769-1843) and Helen, daughter of Capt. John McDonald or MacDonald, of Garth, Perthshire, Scotland. The Campbells were members of the Smalls of Dirnanean in Perthshire. The Rev. Archibald Campbell, the elder son and heir to the baronetcy, died unmarried in 1831 serving as a chaplain in India. After his brother's death, John Campbell became his father's heir.

Campbell showed early skills as an artist, painting or sketching early gatherings and events in New Brunswick while his father served as Lieutenant-Governor of New Brunswick. Today a number of those portraits are in the possession of the Provincial Archives of New Brunswick.

== Military career ==
Campbell entered the army as an ensign in the 38th regiment, which his father then commanded, in 1821, joining the regiment in India. He served as aide-de-camp to his father throughout the first Burmese War, and on 1 July 1824 he was promoted a Lieutenant, without purchase, and in 1826 thanked by the governor-general in council for his services. On 11 July 1826 he was promoted to a company and remained in Burmah in a civil capacity until 1829, when he returned to England and joined the depôt of his regiment.

From 1831 to 1837 Campbell acted as aide-de-camp to his father when serving as Lieutenant-Governor of New Brunswick, and in the latter year he purchased the majority of his regiment. In 1840 he purchased the lieutenant-colonelcy of the 38th, and commanded it continuously in the Mediterranean, the West Indies, and Nova Scotia, until he was selected for the command of a brigade in the expeditionary force intended for the East in 1854.

In 1843 he had succeeded to the baronetcy on the death of his father.

On 11 Nov. 1851 he had been promoted colonel by brevet, and on 24 March 1854 he was posted to the command of the 2nd brigade of the 3rd division under Major-General Sir Richard England, with the rank of Brigadier-General. With that command he was present at the battles of the Alma and Inkerman, and on 12 December 1854 he was promoted major-general. After the Battle of Inkerman as the senior brigadier-general with the army, he was posted to the temporary command of the 4th division.

== Death ==
Oriental Army of the Crimean campaign by Gustav Bartsch. From left to right: Admiral Ferdinand-Alphonse Hamelin, Lord Lucan, Lord Raglan, Admiral Dundas, Sir John Campbell, Duke of Cambridge, Lord Cardigan, Ismail Pasha, Omer Pasha, Muhlis Pasha (Grigore Sturdza), Sultan Abdülmecid I, Said-Bey (Vasile Obedeanu), Ahmed Pasha, col. Desmaret, Marshal Baraguey d'Hilliers, Prince Napoleon, col. Trochu, Marshal de Saint-Arnaud, general Bosquet, general de Canrobert

On 7 June 1855 he was superseded by Lieutenant-General Henry Bentinck, and on hearing of the intended assault upon the Great Redan at Sebastopol he volunteered to lead the detachments of the 4th division to the attack. On 18 June he displayed "a courage amounting to rashness" and after sending away his aides-de-camp, Captain Hume and Captain Snodgrass, the latter the son of the historian of his father's war, he rushed out of the trenches with a few followers, and fell at once in the act of cheering on his men. Had he survived, Campbell would have been rewarded for his services in the winter, for in the London Gazette of 5 July it was announced that he would have been made a KCB.

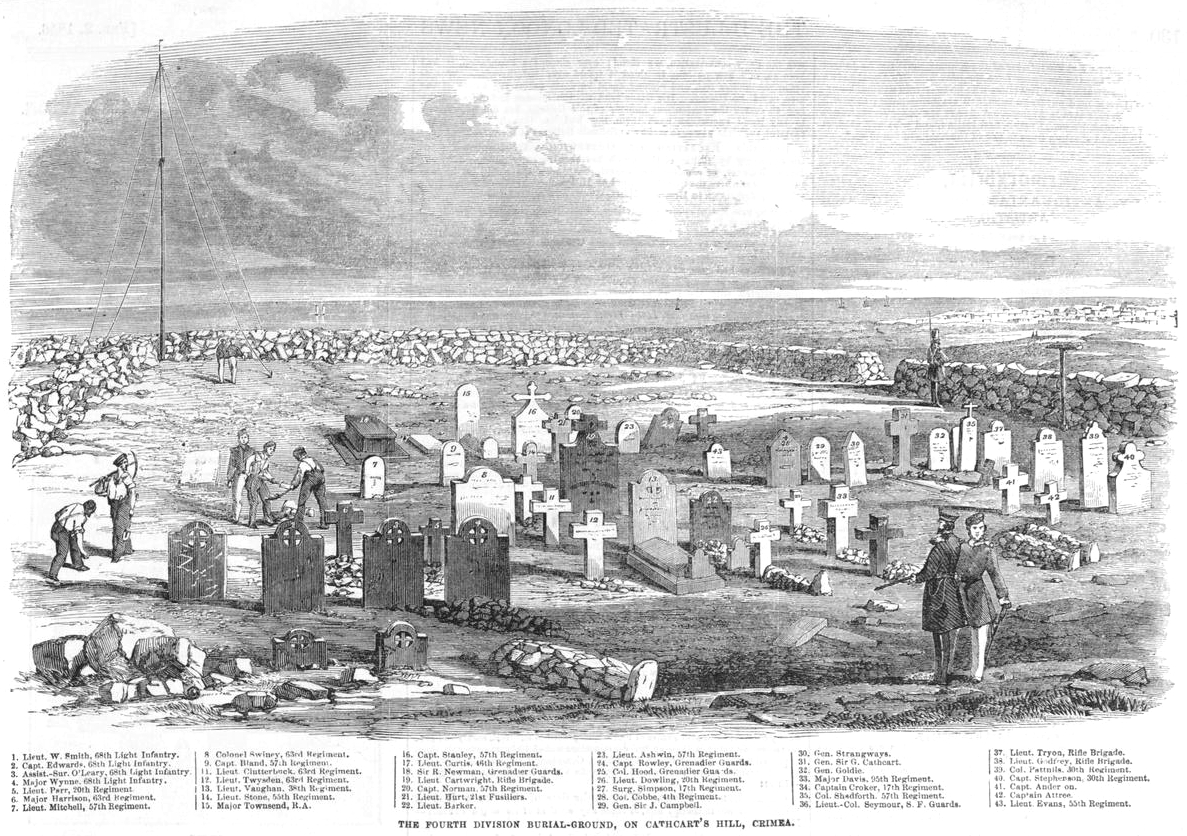
The Fourth Division Burial-Ground, on Cathcart's Hill, Crimea, Illustrated London News, 1856

He was buried on Cathcart's Hill near Sebastopol in what is now part of Ukraine.

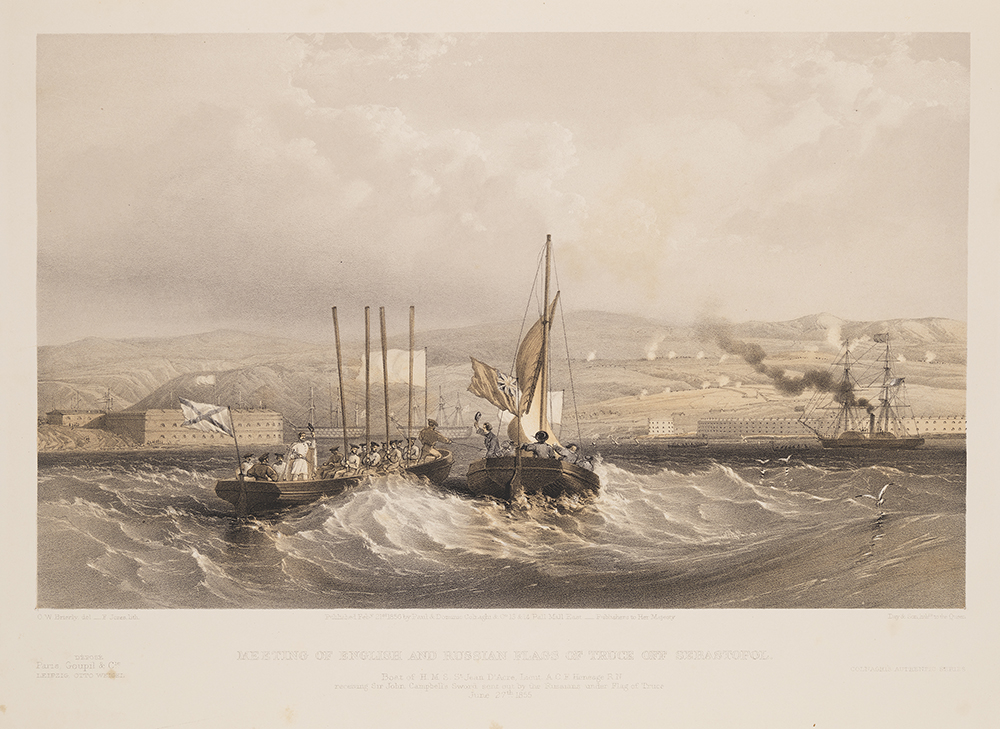
Return of Sir John Campbell's sword to the British on 27 June 1855

His sword and boots were taken from his dead body while it lay on the battlefield, but returned later by a Russian officer.

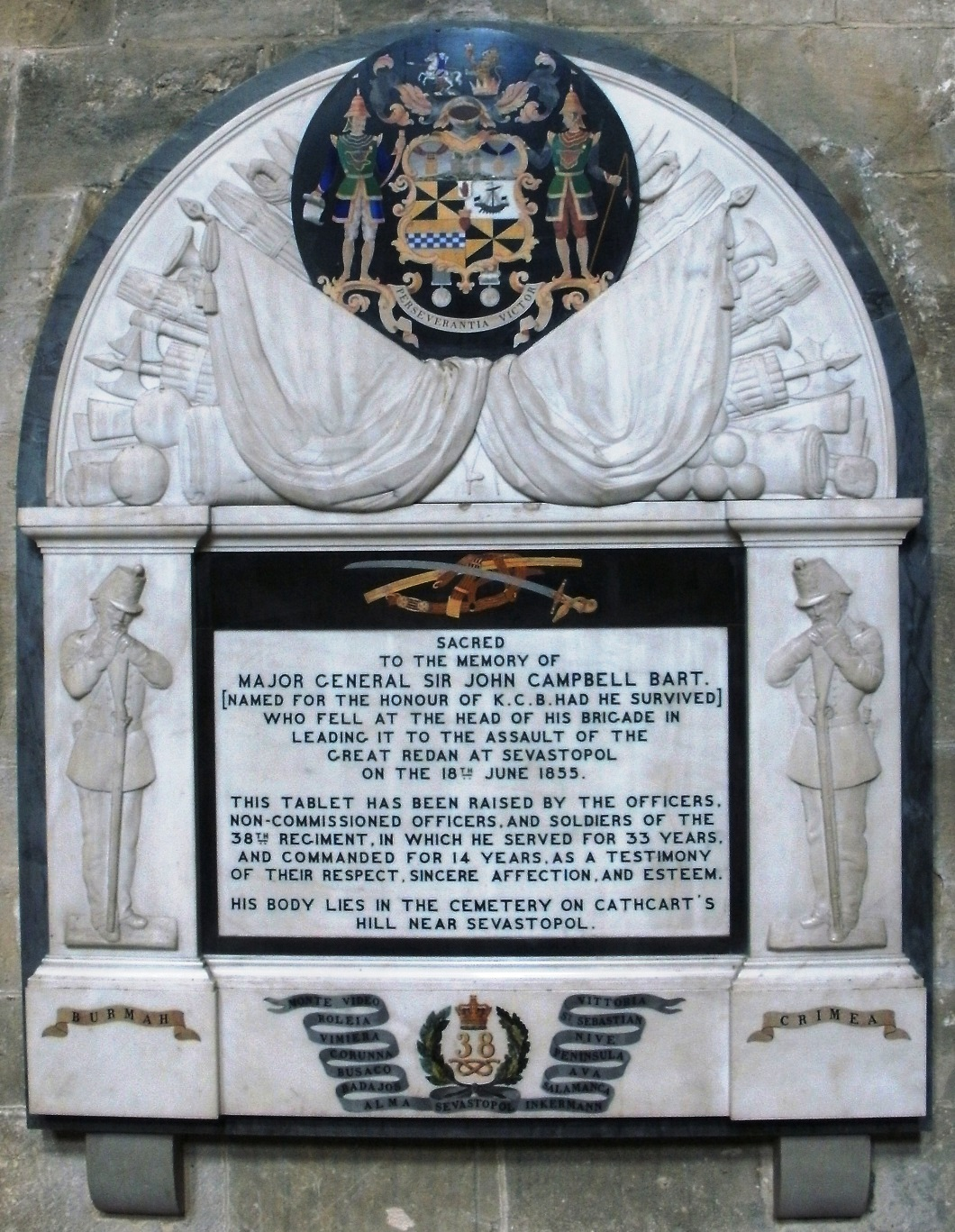
Memorial to Sir John Campbell (1807-1855) in Winchester Cathedral.

Memorials to Sir John Campbell's war service and death were erected at Church of St John the Evangelist, Edinburgh, Scotland and in Winchester Cathedral in Hampshire, United Kingdom.

Sir John Campbell's name appears on the Crimean War Memorial in Bath Abbey Cemetery, Bath, Somerset, England.

Sir John Campbell's swords and other memorabilia related to the Campbell family's military service are on display at the National War Museum of Scotland at Edinburgh Castle.

== Personal life ==
Campbell married Helen Margaret Crowe on 21 July 1841, the only child of Colonel John Crowe of the East India Company. The couple had eight children: five boys and three girls. The eldest son, Archibald Ava Campbell (1844-1913), became the third baronet.

== See also ==
- Campbell Baronets

Baronetage of the United Kingdom
Preceded by General Archibald Campbell	Baronet (of New Brunswick); 1843–1855	Succeeded by Archibald Ava Campbell
