= John Rutty =

- Born: 1697; Melksham, England
- Died: 1775 (aged 77–78); Dublin, Ireland
- Education: University of Leyden
- Occupation: Physician
- Medical career
- Profession: Doctor

John Rutty (1697–1775) was a Dublin Quaker physician and naturalist born in Melksham, Wiltshire, England. He was the author of many texts including A methodical synopsis of the Mineral Waters of Ireland (1757) and An Essay towards the Natural History of the County of Dublin (1772). After his death his spiritual diary was published, and the botanist William Henry Harvey named the genus Acanthaceae Ruttya after him.

== Life ==
He was born of Quaker parents on 25 December 1698. After a medical education at the University of Leyden, where he graduated M.D. in 1723 and read a thesis De Diarrhœa, he settled in Dublin as a physician in 1724. There he practised throughout his life.

Rutty was one of 49 physicians and chirurgeons who declared their public support for the construction of a Publick Bath in Dublin in May 1771 and named Achmet Borumborad as a well qualified individual for carrying such a scheme into existence.

He lived simply and often gave his services to the poor. On 6 April 1775, John Wesley records that he 'visited that venerable man Dr. Rutty.' Rutty then lived in rented rooms at the eastern corner of Boot Lane and Mary's Lane in Dublin.

He died on 27 April 1775, and was buried in a Quaker burial-ground close to St Stephen's Green.

== Works ==
In 1753, he began to keep a spiritual diary and continued it till December 1774, leaving directions in his will for its publication. The chief ill-doings of which he accuses himself are too great a love for the studies of the materia medica and meteorology, irritability, and excessive enjoyment of food. He deplored these excesses in language which caused Samuel Johnson to laugh.

His first medical book was An Account of Experiments on Joanna Stephen's Medicine for the Stone, published in London in 1742. He published in Dublin, in 1751, A History of the Rise and Progress of the People called Quakers in Ireland, from 1653 to 1751, a continuation of a book originally written by Thomas Wight of Cork in 1700; a fourth edition was issued in 1811.

In 1757, he published in London A Methodical Synopsis of Mineral Waters, a quarto of 658 pages, which gives an account of the chief mineral springs of the British Isles and of Europe. He had thrown doubt on some statements of Charles Lucas in his account of the spa of Lisdoonvarna, County Clare, and Lucas issued a general attack on the book.

He published in Dublin, in 1762, a tract called 'The Analysis of Milk', and in 1770 'The Weather and Seasons in Dublin for Forty Years', which mentions the prevalent diseases throughout that period. In 1772 he published A Natural History of the County of Dublin in two volumes. His last work was published at Rotterdam in 1775: it was a Latin treatise on drugs, titled Materia Medica Antiqua et Nova. It had occupied him for forty years.

- Materia medica antiqua et nova, repurgata et illustrata : sive de medicamentorum simplicium officinalium facultatibus tractatus; exhibens 1. Simplicia nobis veteribusque communia, de quibus fere quicquid veria aut verosimile apud Graecos veteres et recentiores et Arabes reperitur, seligitur, enarratur et notis illustratur; 2. Simplicia dubia et noviter detecta, quorum vires indagantur et observationibus atque experimentis recentiorum illustrantur. Opus XL. annorum. Dilly, Rotterodami 1775 – Digital edition by the University and State Library Düsseldorf
