= Clement Archer =

Irish surgeon, President of the RCSI

- Born: 21 December 1748
- Died: 1803 (aged 54–55)
- Medical career
- Profession: Surgeon

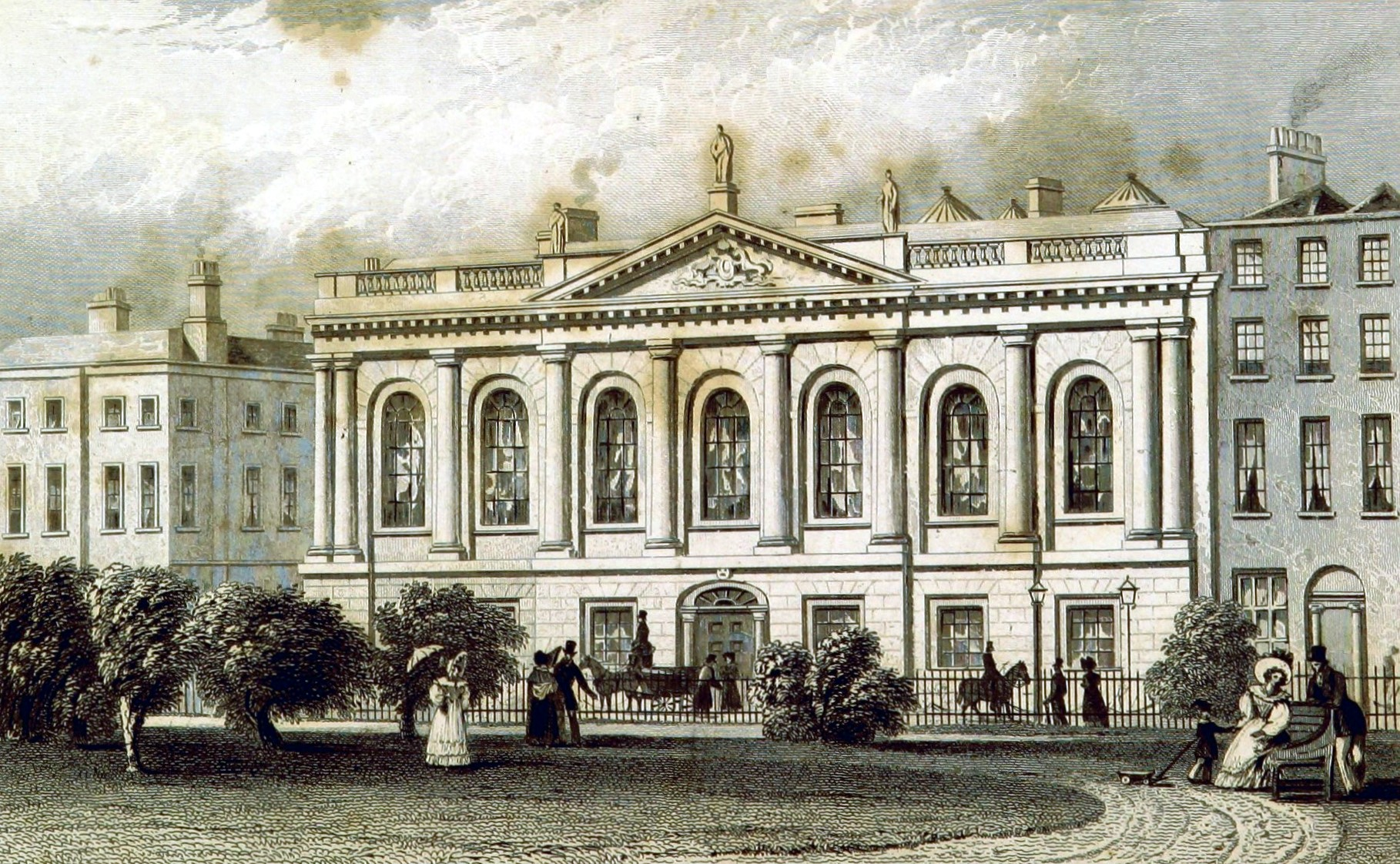
"The College of Surgeons, Dublin". 1837.

Clement Archer (21 December 1748 - 1803) was a surgeon and president of the Royal College of Surgeons in Ireland (RCSI).

Clement Archer was born in County Wexford on 21 December 1748. He was educated as a surgeon, and on 4 February 1772 was examined by the County Infirmaries' Board, and "passed" for the Longford Infirmary.

He settled in Dublin in 1774 and was an original member of the Surgeons' Society. In 1785, he, together with surgeons Bolger, Lindsay, Costelloe, Hartigan, and Graydon, and Drs. Brereton, Percival, Dickson, Kennedy, Bell, and Boyton, founded the Dublin General Dispensary in the old Post Office yard, Temple Bar, the treasurer being Sir William Newcomen.

Archer was one of 49 physicians and chirurgeons who declared their public support for the construction of a Publick Bath in Dublin in May 1771 and named Achmet Borumborad as a well qualified individual for carrying such a scheme into existence.

In 1797, Archer became Assistant Surgeon to Dr Steevens' Hospital and later succeeded John Whiteway as Surgeon of the Foundling Hospital. He was perhaps the first medical man in Ireland who practiced electrotherapy. He was a member of the Dublin Medico-Philosophic Society. In 1789 Archer was elected the first Professor of Pharmacy in RCSI. In 1791 he was appointed State Surgeon of Ireland.

Clement Archer became the President of the RCSI in 1795.
