= Achmet Borumborad =

Fictional Turkish doctor in 18th-century Ireland

Achmet Borumborad (fl. 1769–1786), Achmet Borumbadad (or sometimes simply Dr. Achmet or Mr. Achmet) was the assumed name of an eccentric medical con-artist, or quack, operating in late 18th-century Dublin, Ireland. He succeeded in gathering financial support for the construction of a Hammam (or "Turkish bath") on the banks of the River Liffey in the city. Purportedly a doctor, Borumborad claimed to have been born in Constantinople (Istanbul) from which he had subsequently fled. In reality, he was the fictitious creation of one Patrick Joyce of Kilkenny, or possibly a William Cairns, or Kearns, of Dublin. Adopting the persona of a native Turk, his unusual dress style, turban, and exotic affectations attracted much attention in the city at the time, and he was noted as "the first Turk who had ever walked the streets of Dublin in his native costume."

== History ==
=== Early life ===
According to historian Frank Hopkins, Joyce had "once been an attendant at a Turkish baths in London", his "only connection to Turkey", whereas historian Maurice Craig contends that Joyce may have actually spent part of his youth in the Levant region. Hopkins claims that his real name was William Cairns, as opposed to Joyce, that he had been born somewhere in the north of Ireland, and had been an apprentice apothecary in Dublin at one point.

=== Finglas ===
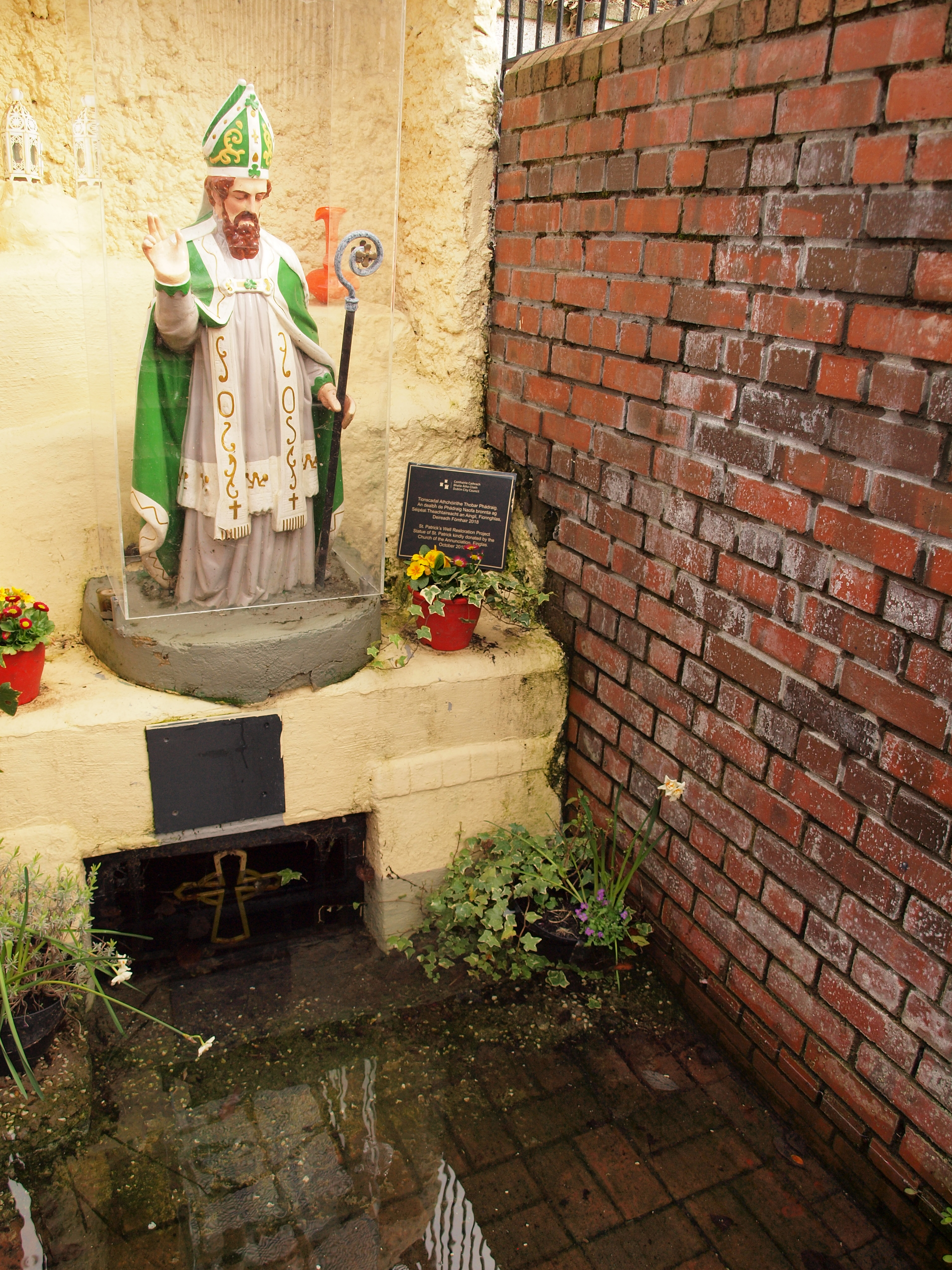
St Patrick's Well, Finglas in 2023

Borumborad's presence in Dublin was first noted in the year 1769, promoting the curative properties of waters in the suburb of Finglas, to the north of the city. Borumborad was convinced of the healing powers of the local St. Patrick's Well which fed the Finglas baths, publishing a pamphlet that year entitled "A Succinct Narrative of the Virtues of St. Patrick's Well at Finglas in the Cure of Scurbotic Complaints".

According to historian Michael J. Tutty, the pamphlet contained "...testimonials from his patients testifying to the life-giving properties of the waters, and inviting the public to join him in bringing them into use with 'taste and elegance' and in making Finglas a rival of Montpellier - then the great Continental resort". The Dictionary of Irish Biography notes that Borumborad was probably operating a medical practice of some description in Dublin or Finglas at the time, although no records attest to any recognised medical qualification he may have ever achieved.

==== Ballroom and Baths ====
On 1 May 1769, Borumborad (styled as "Achmet Borumbadad of ffinglass in the County of Dublin, Doctor of Physick") acted as grantor in a Deed of Mortgage to one George Taylor of the City of Dublin, Tallow Chandler, concerning "all that the Spring of water or well situate on the Lands called part of Cardiff's Castle (Cardiffscastle) near the Town of ffinglass (sic) called St. Patrick's well together with that small piece of land adjoining the same part of the said lands as now enclosed [..] together with all buildings and improvements thereon made, built and erected by the said Achmet Borumbadad". The mortgage was valued at £150.

Four months later, on 9 September 1769, Borumborad was involved in a 'Further deed of Mortgage' with the same George Taylor whereby a further consideration of £140 was mentioned, involving the same well in Finglas, but with the addition of "all buildings and improvements erected and made on the said premises now called and known by the name of the Ballroom and Baths". Borumborad subsequently sub-leased the lands to Taylor in a Deed of Assignment dated 7 November 1769, for the residue (remainder) of an 18-year lease he himself had been leasing from one "Richard Shew of Ffinglass aforesaid, ffarmer". It is unclear when Borumborad had initially begun leasing the land from Shew.

=== Conception of Batchelors Quay baths ===
Prior the Acts of Union 1800 between England and Ireland, Ireland had a parliament of her own which, according to librarian Michael Hewson, "had been fairly generous in making grants for projects which seemed worthwhile". Borumborad made use of this favourable environment and lobbied Parliament for money to build 'Hot and Cold Sea-Water Baths' along the quays of the River Liffey, together with free medical attention for the poor who attended. His plans were publicly endorsed by 50 surgeons and physicians, and 56 members of the Irish parliament who agreed to pay an annual sum for the upkeep of the facility. At various points between 1771 and 1781, Borumborad petitioned for help, and was "usually successful", according to Hewson.

On 4 May 1771, a notice appeared in the Freeman's Journal declaring the approbation, or approval, of a list of 30 named physicians, and 19 chirurgeons, who believed that Borumborad was competent in carrying a "Publick Bath" scheme into existence. Amongst those who committed their support were John Rutty, Charles Lucas, Fielding Ould, John Curry, Clement Archer, Francis Hutcheson and Philip Woodroffe.

Five days later, on 9 May 1771, the same paper laid out a prepared list of 11 'Proposals for Establishing a Set of Elegant and Commodious Baths in the City of Dublin' detailing the range of services the intended baths should offer, the desired equipment, and the details for a public subscription in order to raise the necessary funds to build it, which they valued at £612, 4 shillings. As part of the manifesto, the "erection, direction and conduct of the baths (were) committed to Mr. Achmet":

I. That a convenient Building, or Buildings, shall be erected, fit to contain all the various Kinds of Baths, simple or medicated, cold, temperate, tepid, or warm, with Stoves and Vapor Baths, Pumps or Water Brushes, with convenient Chambers and Appendages.

(..)

IX. That the Erection, Direction and Conduct of the Baths be committed to Mr. Achmet, who pledges himself with the Public, to carry the Scheme, with the utmost Exactness and Fidelity, into Execution, so as best may answer the Expectation of the Public in general, the Subscribers in particular, and more especially, the Learned of the Faculty of Physic (sic), and Profession of Surgery, under whose Direction and Auspices, he wishes to conduct the Baths.

At the end of the same article, Borumborad thanked the committee for their approbation and assured them that the project would greatly benefit the public, and reflect much honour on the committee members too. He took the opportunity to remind the physicians that until such time as he could receive their patients at the new baths, his baths at Finglass would remain open and had "almost every convenience in it for to accommodate your patients (sic) [..] where the situation has all those properties which constitute good air". He noted he could also procure lodgings for patients if needed at "agreeable lodges", and signed off using only his first name - Achmet. The proposals, as well as Borumborad's response, were reprinted in the 11 May 1771 edition of Freeman's Journal.

=== Opening of baths ===
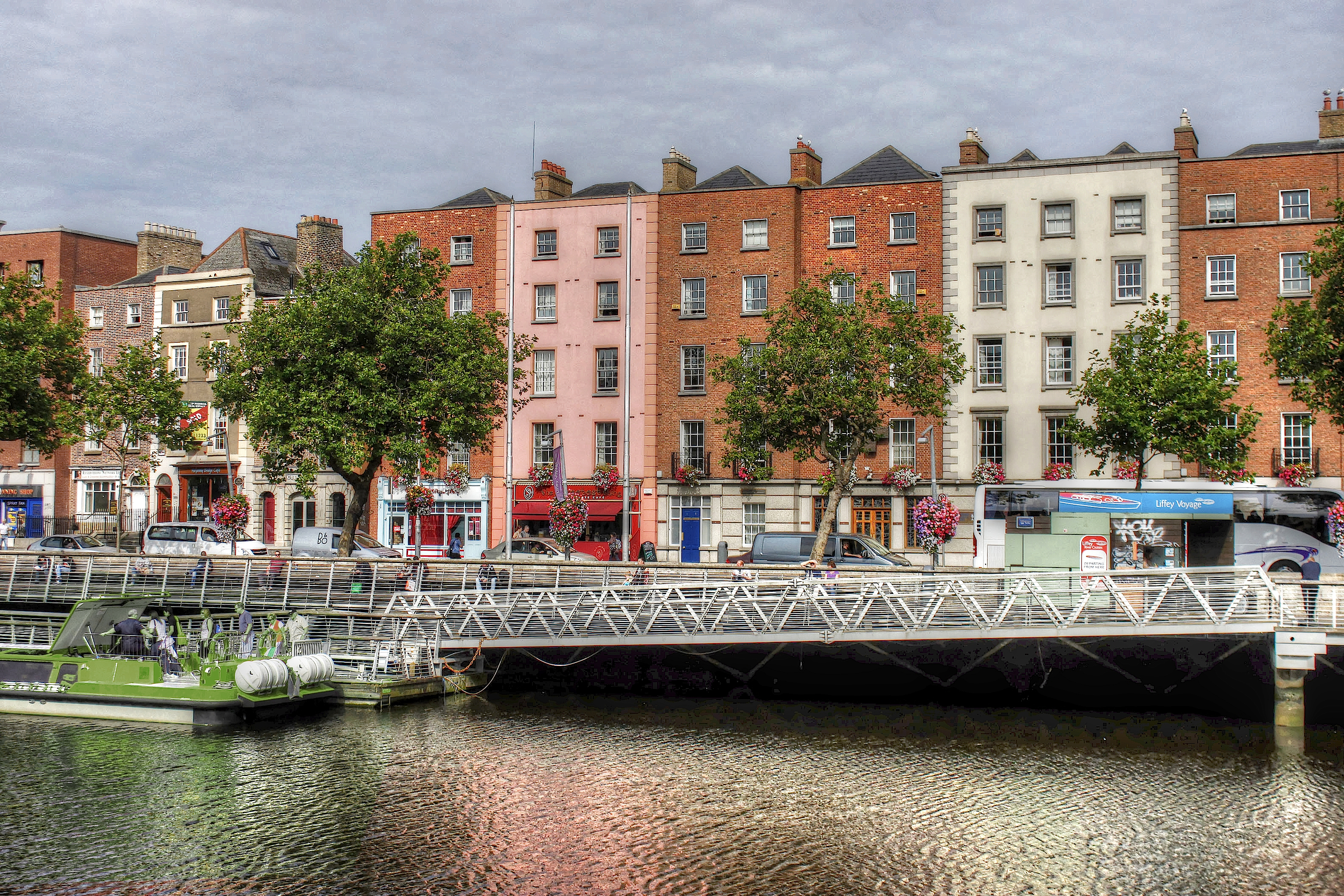
Bachelors Walk, Dublin in 2012

In October 1771, Borumborad finally opened his new Turkish baths at Batchelors Quay (modern day Bachelors Walk). Hopkins notes that the endeavour was based at number 40 Bachelor's Quay and named the 'Royal Patent Baths'. In 1771, the House of Commons Journals make note of financial support given to 'Dr Achmet' for his baths, and notes are recorded for several following years after. The baths were a great success, with Jonah Barrington (judge, lawyer and prominent Dublin socialite) proclaiming that "a more ingenious or useful establishment could not be formed in any metropolis."

On 2 October 1772, George Townshend, acting as Lord Lieutenant of Ireland (days before he relinquished the post to his successor), wrote a letter to the then-monarch (George III)'s secretary, requesting that he grant letters patent to Borumborad "for the Sole Use, Benefit & Advantage of his new(ly) constructed Baths & apparatus" in Dublin. Within the correspondence, Townshend noted that "the Whole Faculty of Physicians & Surgeons of the City of Dublin who viewed his (Borumborad's) said New Baths & Apparatus, have taken the Utility of the Same unto their most serious Consideration, & have thought proper, by a Certificate signed by them [..] to Signify their fullest Approbation thereof & to recommend & declare the Memorialist, as the Founder thereof, to be a Person worthy of Publick Encouragement in which Opinion I concur....". It is unclear whether George III granted the letters patent or not.

At a general meeting of the physicians and surgeons held in Dublin on 6 October 1773, the following rates were settled upon to be paid by "Cold Bathers" at the facility:

The Great Cold Bath (To such Bathers who are found with Towels and Caps)
Frequency of payment	£	Shillings	Pence	Equivalent in Pence per day
By the Year	5	13	9	3½
By the Half-Year	3	8	3	4½
By the Quarter	2	5	6	6
By the Month	1	2	9	9
By the Week	0	7	7	13
By the Time	0	2	2	-

The Great Cold Bath (To such Bathers who find themselves with every Thing)
Frequency of payment	£	Shillings	Pence	Equivalent in Pence per day
By the Year	3	8	3	2¾
By the Half-Year	2	5	6	3
By the Quarter	1	12	6	4
By the Month	0	16	3	6½
By the Week	0	5	5	9¾
By the Time	0	1	1	-

In addition to the Great Cold Bath, six private 'Cold Salt Water Baths' adjoining it opened on 19 October 1773. These baths were separate and distinct from the Great Bath, and from each other. Rates of bathing in these private baths, "to any Lady or Gentlemen", were as follows:

Cold Salt Water Baths (Children under the Age of 12 Years, if more in Number than one, at Half Price)
Frequency of payment	£	Shillings	Pence
By the Year	6	16	6
By the Half-Year	4	11	0
By the Quarter	2	16	10½
By the Month	1	14	1½
By the Time	0	2	8½

The Freeman's Journal gives an account of some of the rules that were in place in the bath as of October 1773, noting that persons afflicted with skin conditions could only be accommodated by contacting Borumborad directly, and the existence of a two hour slot for women only.

"- No person who is afflicted with any disagreeable Sore or Foulness of the Skin, can be admitted into any of these Baths - It is by no Means intended for to exclude (sic) the Benefit of them, for, upon their applying to Doctor Achmet, he will accommodate them upon the aforesaid Terms in Baths set apart for that Purpose.
- No Attendance can be given to any of the Cold Bathers more than a Person to keep the Door and shew (sic) them into the Bath by Rotation. Every Bather and Subscriber is to pay at the Door.
- The Great Cold Bath will be opened each Morning from Eight till Twelve o'Clock.
-The Great Cold Bath will open at One o'Clock each Day, and continue open till Three, for the Reception of Ladies only, when it will be closed for the remainder of the Day.
☛ N.B. As the Rules and Regulations at large, as established and approved of by the Faculty, are too long for a Publication in a Newspaper, they will be printed and framed with the Gentlemen's Signatures thereto, and hung up in every Apartment of the Baths."

— from the 15 January 1774 edition of Freeman's Journal

On 15 December 1773, several of the nobility and gentry gathered at Doctor Achmet's Baths to assess how the project was progressing, and discuss how best to collect subscriptions. With the Duke of Leinster in the chair, they resolved that the baths appeared to be of the "highest public utility", and that Dr. Achmet "well deserved the support and encouragement of the public". They agreed that the "most effectual method which at present can be resorted to, is a general subscription upon the terms already published and approved of by the Gentlemen of the Faculty", and encouraged all persons who approved of the 'useful institution' to pay their subscriptions to one of the following: the Duke of Leinster, Earl of Ross, Bishop of Corke, Lord Blayney, The Rt Honble John Besford, Doctor Smyth, Doctor Barry, Doctor Quin, Doctor Hutchinson, Mr Golvilie or the publisher George Faulkner. The final act of the meeting was to agree that the resolutions be published in the Dublin Journal.

On 25 December 1774, Borumborad (now styled as "Achmet Borumbadad, Doctor of Physick, Proprietor of the Dublin Baths") began leasing a plot of land from Simon Vierpyl, a statuary (sculptor), consisting of a dwelling house and adjacent plot of land fronting 52 feet in total along Batchelors Quay. The adjacent plot of land had previously been used by Vierpyl as a portland stone yard. The term of the lease was for 149 years at the yearly rent of £73 (above taxes), and included a covenant whereby an additional rent of £5 per annum would be levied "in case a bridge shall be built across the River Liffee (sic) eastward of Essex Bridge from the time such bridge shall be completely furnished". Although the area was named as Batchelors Quay in this 1774 deed, it is worth noting that at least as early as John Rocque's 1756 map entitled An Exact Survey of the City and Suburbs of Dublin, the area was already known by some as Batchelors Walk, a precursor to the modern spelling of Bachelors Walk.

=== Prominence and influence ===
According to Hewson, there was some doubt as to exactly "what part of the East Doctor Borumborad hailed from", but the author of a poem called The Medical Review published in 1775 registered no such doubts:

"His foreign accent, head close shaved or sheard,
His flowing whiskers and great length of beard,
His rolled-up turban, habit loose and cool,
Denote him a true native of Stamboule".

On 12 January 1778, Borumborad was admitted to the County Kildare "Knot", or Assembly of the Brethren, of the group known as The Friendly Brothers of Saint Patrick. Borumborad was admitted at the level of a Novice, and was not allowed to progress any further as he did not "profess" himself a Christian.

Borumborad would advertise the opening hours of the baths in Dublin newspapers, for example an advertisement from the Freeman's Journal dated May 1778 reads: "Dr. Achmet informs the Public that the Baths appropriated to the Reception of the Poor will be opened, as usual, on Sunday next, the 10th Inst. and to continue so during the Summer Season. Royal Baths, May 8th, 1778".

"Impressed with the most perfect Respect and Gratitude, Doctor Achmet begs Leave to return their Excellencies the Lord and Lady Lieutenant, the Patronesses of the Poor Bath Institution, the Nobility and Gentry, his most grateful Acknowledgments for the Honour conferred on him, as the Individual intrusted (sic) with the Emoluments of last Tuesday's Ball, in Aid of the Poor Baths (...) without which Thousands of the most miserable afflicted Objects in a Variety of Diseases, which the Baths are applicable to, must remain unrelieved. Royal Baths, May 20, 1778"

— from the 21 May 1778 edition of Freeman's Journal

Historian Toby Barnard contends that the baths may have served as a type of bagnio, locations which "inhabited a twilight area between restorative baths and sleazy massage parlours", but which nonetheless "acquired respectability under the management of Dr Achmet as they became a focal point for medical faddism" in the city.

In September 1778, Borumborad sub-leased the lands at Batchelors Quay to one William Marshall, Esquire, for the remainder of the term of 149 years, subject to redemption on payment of £2,093. 10s. 0d on a date six years later in September 1784. An indented deed drawn up in April 1784, witnessed that Marshall reassigned the lease back to Borumborad "in consideration of the sum of £600. 17s. 1d (being the sum then due upon the foot of the said recited mortgage for principal interest and costs)". It is known that Borumborad also engaged in property developments in Abbey Street Lower around the same time.

In an 1886 essay entitled "The Medallists of Ireland and Their Work", the academic William Frazer describes how Borumborad ("proprietor of baths in Dublin") once presented the Hon John Beresford and his second wife Barbara with a medal "as a token of gratitude for his assistance in securing Parliamentary grants for the establishment of a public baths in Dublin". The curved medal was struck in 1782 by William Mossop and designed be set into the side of a tankard of silver. Frazer finished the paragraph with the brief epitaph: "Achmet, who was the son of a Dublin tradesman named Kearns, dressed like a Turk, and passed for one for some years. An amusing account of his baths, &c, is given in Madden's "Periodical Literature," vol. ii., p. 209."

=== Hamilton incident ===
Before every parliamentary session, Borumborad would give a large party, at which wine and song "ministered to the good temper of the Members (of Parliament)". As historian Maurice Craig contends, "On one occasion, hoping for a larger grant for an extension, he gave a particularly grand entertainment to nearly thirty of the leading Members. Unfortunately, while the Turk was in his cellar bringing up another dozen to finish the good work, a comparatively abstentious Member (Sir John S. Hamilton) got up to leave. He was pursued by some of the keener drinkers, who with wild cries protested that he must stay to drink the last dozen. He hastened his steps in what he believed to be the direction of the street-entrance, and (since it was dark and the evening well advanced) fell precipitately into the Doctor's great cold bath".

Some of the other MPs also fell into the water after Hamilton, and it is considered that Borumborad lost influence with the group after the incident. Parliamentary support was withdrawn for his baths in the months that followed, and his reputation suffered as a result of a rumour that was spread amongst the citizens of the city that Borumborad had "...personally strangled the Christians in the Seven Towers of Constantinople".

=== Later life ===
In April 1784, Borumborad assigned the remainder of his lease at the Dublin Baths along Batchelors Walk to the Wide Streets Commission for the sum of £3,515. 16s. 6d.

Borumborad appears in a memorial of an Indorsement dated 1 June 1786, concerning the sale of the Conniving House tavern in Sandymount, "formerly in the possession of Michael Donnelly and lately in the possession of Richard Cranfield", an associate of Simon Vierpyl's. At this stage Borumborad was known as "Achmet Borum Badad (sic), Proprietor of the Royal Baths in the City of Dublin".

== True identity ==
Much of what is recorded of Borumborad derives from the memoirs of Jonah Barrington, including the entry in the 2009 Dictionary of Irish Biography. According to this account, Borbumborad fell in love with, and married, the sister of a well-known surgeon anatomist named William Hartigan (c.1766-1812), who lived at 8 South King Street (and later 3 Kildare Street). Borumbadad eventually revealed his true identity to this woman after being required to shave his beard and convert to Christianity in order to prove his devotion to her. An account of this event was recorded by a friend of the Hartigans named Miss Owen. The woman's first name is unknown, but a 1954 article in the Irish Press by historian Desmond Ryan states that she was an "actress of some notoriety", and that Borbumborad "subsequently abandoned her". Barrington's account concludes that, after revealing his true identity, "many people lost faith in the baths" and "I regret that I never inquired as to Joyce’s subsequent career, nor can I say whether he is or not still in the land of the living." Desmond Ryan, as well as historian Richard Robert Madden, claim that the name Patrick Joyce may also have been a pseudonym, and that the man may actually have been a Dublin-based tradesman by the name of William Cairns, or Kearns.

Murat R. Şiviloğlu in a 2024 article casts doubt over much of Barrington's account, including the name Joyce and the Hartigan connection. Şiviloğlu says Borumborad was really William Cairns, of "a distinguished Ulster Scots family". His first wife was Agnes Gregg (died 1785), sister of Belfast merchant William Gregg (died 1782). Their eldest son Nathaniel Cairns (born 1759) became William Gregg's heir; another son, William Cairns, was father of Hugh Cairns (1819–1885), who became Lord High Chancellor of Great Britain and was ennobled as Earl Cairns. Şiviloğlu says Borumborad's imposture was exposed by Bartholomew Dominiceti, who ran a London Turkish bathhouse and believed Borumborad had stolen his patents and investors. After his first wife's death, Cairns/Borumborad married 18-year-old actress Catherine Ann Egan, daughter of a Kilkenny surgeon; she was rumoured in the 1790s to have eloped with a baronet from Limerick. Borumborad may be the medical William Cairns recorded in 1793 in the Bengal Presidency.

== Costume and appearance ==
External image
- "Dr Achmet in the Character of the Sultan" (1780 engraving; p. 22 fig. 7)

Borumborad's unusual appearance and Ottoman dress attracted considerable attention in Dublin of the time. According to Michael Hewson:

"...He cut a very imposing figure being a well built man, over six feet tall, with a splendid black beard. His Turkish dress and the turban which crowned his head added to the dignity of his appearance and he spoke English with only a slight accent".

== Impact on literature ==
James Joyce's 1939 novel Finnegans Wake includes a character named "Afamado Hairductor Achmed Borumborad", an Indian sahib and aural surgeon whom the character of Anna Livia Plurabelle (ALP) consults on behalf of Humphrey Chimpden Earwicker (HCE). The character had an address at Sydney Parade, Dublin.

Spurr contends that the character of Borumborad (along with another character named Kavanagh) represents a hybrid figure recurring throughout the book which identifies the Irish with Indians as objects of colonial domination under the British.

== See also ==
- List of fictitious people
- Sake Dean Mahomed, a Bengali traveller, surgeon, entrepreneur who lived in Cork during the 1780-90s
- Francis Tumblety, a nineteenth century Irish-born American medical quack
- Victorian Turkish baths, Lincoln Place, a separate Dublin establishment which opened in 1860

== Sources ==
- Barnard, T. C. (1 January 2001). "'Grand Metropolis' or 'The Anus of the World'? The Cultural Life of Eighteenth-Century Dublin". Proceedings of the British Academy. 107. Oxford: Oxford University Press: 185–210.
- Benstock, Bernard (1 March 1965). "A Finnegans Wake Address Book". James Joyce Quarterly. 2 (3). Tulsa: University of Tulsa: 195–203. JSTOR 25486506.
- Devlin, Kimberley J.; Zhang, Mingming (1 September 2011). "ALP's Polyvocal Testimony in III.3: A Collaborative Interpretation". James Joyce Quarterly. 49 (1). Tulsa: University of Tulsa: 91–107. doi:10.1353/jjq.2011.0119. JSTOR 24598695.
- Craig, Maurice (1952). Dublin 1660-1860: The Shaping of a City. Dublin: Liberties Press. ISBN 978-1905483112.
- Fleetwood, Dr. John F. (1 September 1990). "Irish Quacks and Quackery". Dublin Historical Record. 43 (2). Dublin: Old Dublin Society: 70–84. JSTOR 30100953.
- Fraser, A. M. (1 August 1956). "The Friendly Brothers of St. Patrick". Dublin Historical Record. 14 (2). Dublin: Old Dublin Society: 34–40. JSTOR 30102639.
- Frazer, William (1 April 1886). "The Medallists of Ireland and Their Work". The Journal of the Royal Historical and Archaeological Association of Ireland. Fourth Series. 7 (66). Dublin: Royal Society of Antiquaries of Ireland: 443–466. JSTOR 25506957.
- Hart, W. A. (1 May 2002). "Africans in Eighteenth-Century Ireland". Irish Historical Studies. 33 (129). Cambridge: Cambridge University Press: 19–32. doi:10.1017/S0021121400015480. JSTOR 30006953.
- Hopkins, Frank (2002). Rare Old Dublin. Heroes, Hawkers & Hoors. Douglas, Cork: Marino Books. ISBN 1-86023-154-3.
- Moore, Desmond F. (1 March 1966). "The Royal Hibernian Academy". Dublin Historical Record. 21 (1). Dublin: Old Dublin Society: 28–37. JSTOR 30104289.
- Simms, Dr. J. G. (1 December 1977). "Dublin in 1776". Dublin Historical Record. 31 (1). Dublin: Old Dublin Society: 2–13. JSTOR 30104025.
- Spurr, David (1 December 1966). "Writing in the "Wake" of Empire". Modern Language Notes. 111 (5). Baltimore: The Johns Hopkins University Press: 872–888. JSTOR 3251250.
- Tutty, Michael J. (1 March 1973). "Finglas". Dublin Historical Record. 26 (2). Dublin: Old Dublin Society: 66–73. JSTOR 30082560.
