= William Hartigan (Irish surgeon) =

Irish physician

Dr. William Hartigan A28096

William Hartigan, MD, MRCSI (1756–1812), was an Irish surgeon.

He was born in Dublin in 1756, was educated as a surgeon, and commenced to practice in Dublin about 1778. On 17 August 1780, he was elected a member of the Dublin Society of Surgeons, and on the incorporation of the surgeons as the Royal College of Surgeons in Ireland (RCSI) in 1784, Hartigan was elected a member.

In 1789 he was appointed Professor of Anatomy in RCSI and he published a syllabus of lectures in 1796. He was appointed Professor of Surgery in RCSI in 1798. Hartigan was elected President of the Royal College of Surgeons in Ireland for the year 1797. He was later appointed Professor of Anatomy in Trinity College, Dublin University (TCD) and was subsequently appointed Professor of Anatomy in TCD.

In Cameron's History of RCSI, Hartigan is described as " having a good presence and agreeable manners, he secured a considerable amount of popularity in his circle. With his pupils he was a favourite; on two occasions those at the College of Surgeons presented him with complimentary addresses."

Hartigan died on 15 December 1812, and was interred in St. Ann's Church, Dawson Street. The house in which Hartigan so long resided (3 Kildare-street) was eventually sold to the Kildare Street Club, by whom it was pulled down.

He married firstly Isabella Steward (deceased circa 1783-1787) and secondly Anne Elizabeth Pollock. By his first wife he had one child Stuart Hartigan. By his second wife, he had several children including Edward and Charlotte, who married Sir Matthew Barrington, 2nd Baronet, best remembered as the founder of Barrington's Hospital, Limerick.

There is a portrait of William Hartigan in the National Gallery of Art, Washington by US artist Gilbert Stuart. One source notes that this portrait was described in a 1922 exhibition catalogue as Dr Hartigan, "A noted Surgeon and member of the Faculty of Trinity College, Dublin." This likeness is also reproduced in "Portrait of Irish Medicine."
