= John Whiteway (surgeon) =

Irish physician (c.1722–1797)

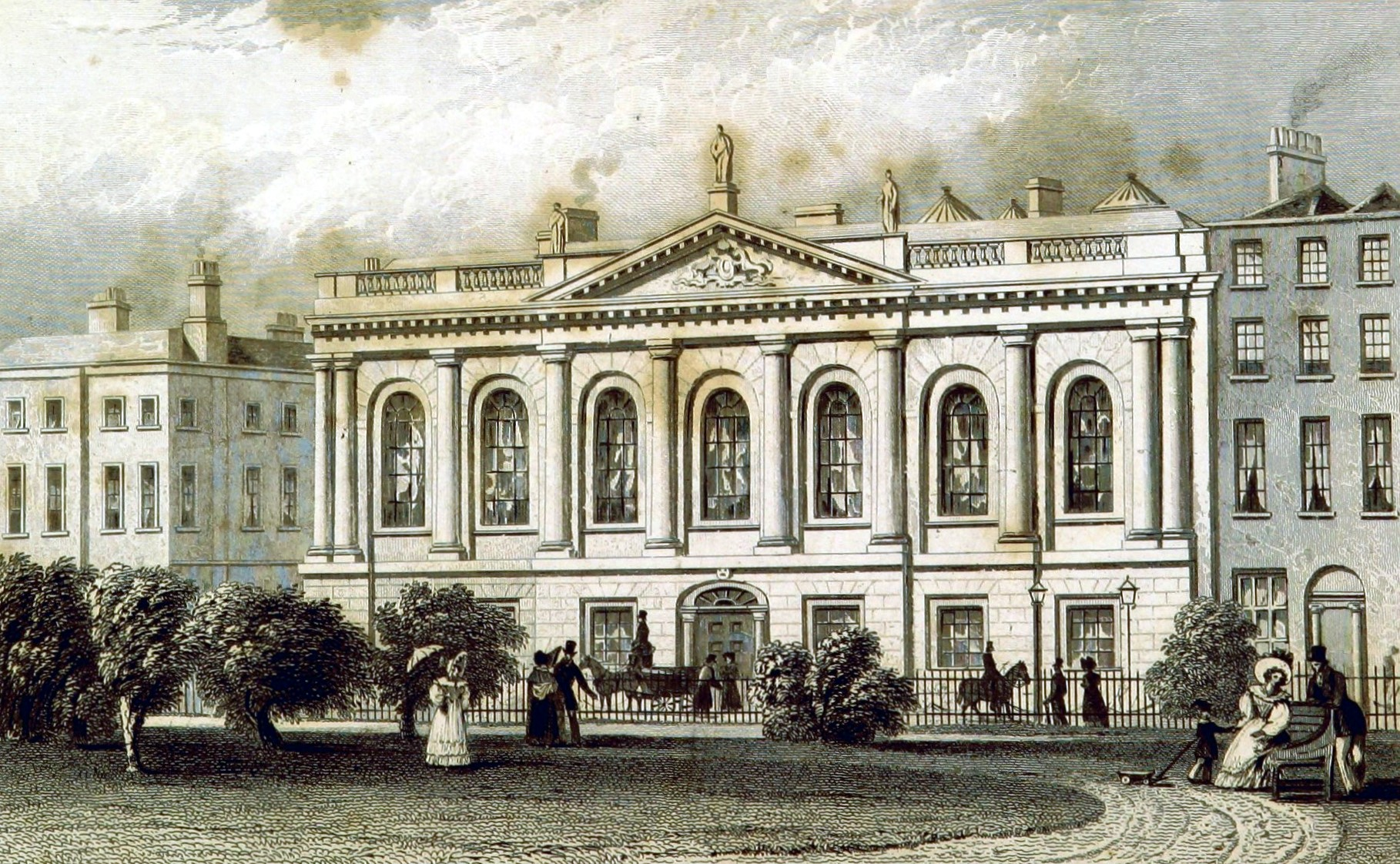
The College of Surgeons, Dublin (1837)

John Whiteway (c. 1722 – 25 May 1797) was a Dublin surgeon who was the second president of the Royal College of Surgeons in Ireland (RCSI) in 1786.

A kinsman of Whiteway, Jonathan Swift, Dean of St Patrick's Cathedral, Dublin, paid for Whiteway's education as a surgeon, and Cameron notes that Whiteway performed the autopsy on Swift. He was appointed visiting surgeon to St Patrick's Hospital, Dublin, and visiting physician to Dr Steevens' Hospital. He was also Surgeon to the Hospital for Venereal Diseases, North King Street. Cameroon notes that his practice was large, and he was considered a skilful surgeon, and usually employed the flap operation in amputations.

Whiteway was one of 49 physicians and chirurgeons who declared their public support for the construction of a Publick Bath in Dublin in May 1771 and named Achmet Borumborad as a well qualified individual for carrying such a scheme into existence.
