= Maurice Craig (historian) =

Irish architectural historian

Maurice James Waldron Craig
- Born: 25 October 1919; Belfast
- Died: 11 May 2011 (aged 91)
- Education: Trinity College Dublin
- Known for: Architectural historian

Maurice James Waldron Craig (25 October 1919 – 11 May 2011) was an Irish architectural historian, the author of several books on the architectural heritage of Ireland and other subjects, and a conservation activist.

== Life ==
He was born in Belfast in 1919, in a prosperous presbyterian family, though he later rejected his unionist background in favour of socialism and atheism and respect for Irish culture. He attended Castle Park School in Dalkey, Dublin, Shrewsbury School in England, Magdalene College, Cambridge, then returned to Ireland where, persuaded by poet Patrick Kavanagh, he completed a doctorate at Trinity College Dublin on the works of the early 19th-century English poet Walter Savage Landor.

Craig became active in Dublin architecture conservation in the 1940s.

From 1952, he worked in London in the Inspectorate of Ancient Monuments, but left in 1970 to join An Taisce in Dublin as its full-time executive secretary.

Craig was a prolific photographer of buildings. He donated his large collection to the Irish Architectural Archive in 2001, and anthologies of his photos have been published in book form.

Craig was married three times. His first marriage was to Beatrix Hurst, from which he had two children, and the second was to Jeanne Edwards. His third wife was actress and singer Agnes Bernelle, with whom he lived in Sandymount, Dublin, until her death in 1999.

== Bibliography ==
His books include:

- The Dublin City Churches of The Church of Ireland An Illustrated Handbook (1948) – A guide to the Church of Ireland churches located in Dublin City
- The Volunteer Earl (1948) – a biography of James Caulfeild, 1st Earl of Charlemont
- Dublin 1660–1860: The Shaping of a City (1952, 1969) – an influential work at a time of crisis for Dublin's colonial architecture
- Irish Bookbindings 1600–1800 (1954) – a history of Irish bookbinding
- Ireland Observed (1970, 1980, with Desmond FitzGerald) - a survey of Irish buildings
- Classic Irish Houses of the Middle Size (1976) – a survey of 17th/18th/19th-century houses of the minor gentry
- The Architecture of Ireland from the Earliest Times to 1880 (1982)
- The Elephant and the Polish Question (1990) - a varied collection of essays
- Cats and their Poets: An Anthology (2002) - a collection of ancient and modern poems about cats
- Mausolea Hibernica (2009) - a survey of mausoleums in Ireland
- Poems - a collection of poetry
- Photographs (2011) - a collection of architectural photographs taken by Craig around Ireland
