= State Surgeon of Ireland =

The office of State Surgeon of Ireland, or State Chirurgeon, was created by patent, on 1 July 1774, and was first filled by Archibald Richardson, who resided in Stafford Street, Dublin. The salary was fixed at £131 13s. 4d. In 1784 George Stewart succeeded Richardson, who became Chirurgeon General; and in 1787, Stewart having become Chirurgeon-General, John Neill, or Neile, of Dominick Street, succeeded him. In 1791 Gustavus Hume and Clement Archer were appointed joint State Surgeons. Archer being dead, and Hume having resigned, Gerard Macklin was appointed State Surgeon, on 22 October 1806 and he was the last holder of the office.
