= Thomas Hume =

Irish physician

Thomas Hume, M.D. (ca. 1769 – 1850) was an Irish medical doctor.

== Biography ==
Hume was born in Dublin in about 1769 to Gustavus Hume a surgeon. He was educated at Trinity College, Dublin, where he graduated B.A. in 1792, M.B. in 1796, and M.D. in 1803. On 6 July 1804 he was incorporated M.D. at Oxford as a member of University College He was admitted a candidate of the College of Physicians on 25 June 1807, a fellow on 25 June 1808, was censor in 1814, 1821, 1831, and 1832, and was declared an elect on 18 January 1832.

Hume sailed for Portugal as physician to the army under Arthur Wellesley in June 1808, but returned to England during the following year, and became physician to the Westminster Hospital. Resigning this office in 1811, he went back to the Peninsula. Hume was accused of insubordination and making false reports and his case was tried in 1813. He was found not guilty and the courts result was endorsed by the Prince Regent. Hume received from the commander-in-chief the appointment of physician to the London district, which he held until the establishment was broken up by the peace of 1815. He was physician to the Duke of Cambridge for some years. He died at Hanwell on 21 October 1850, aged 81, and was buried in the family vault of his wife, the last descendant of the mathematician, Dr. John Wallis.
