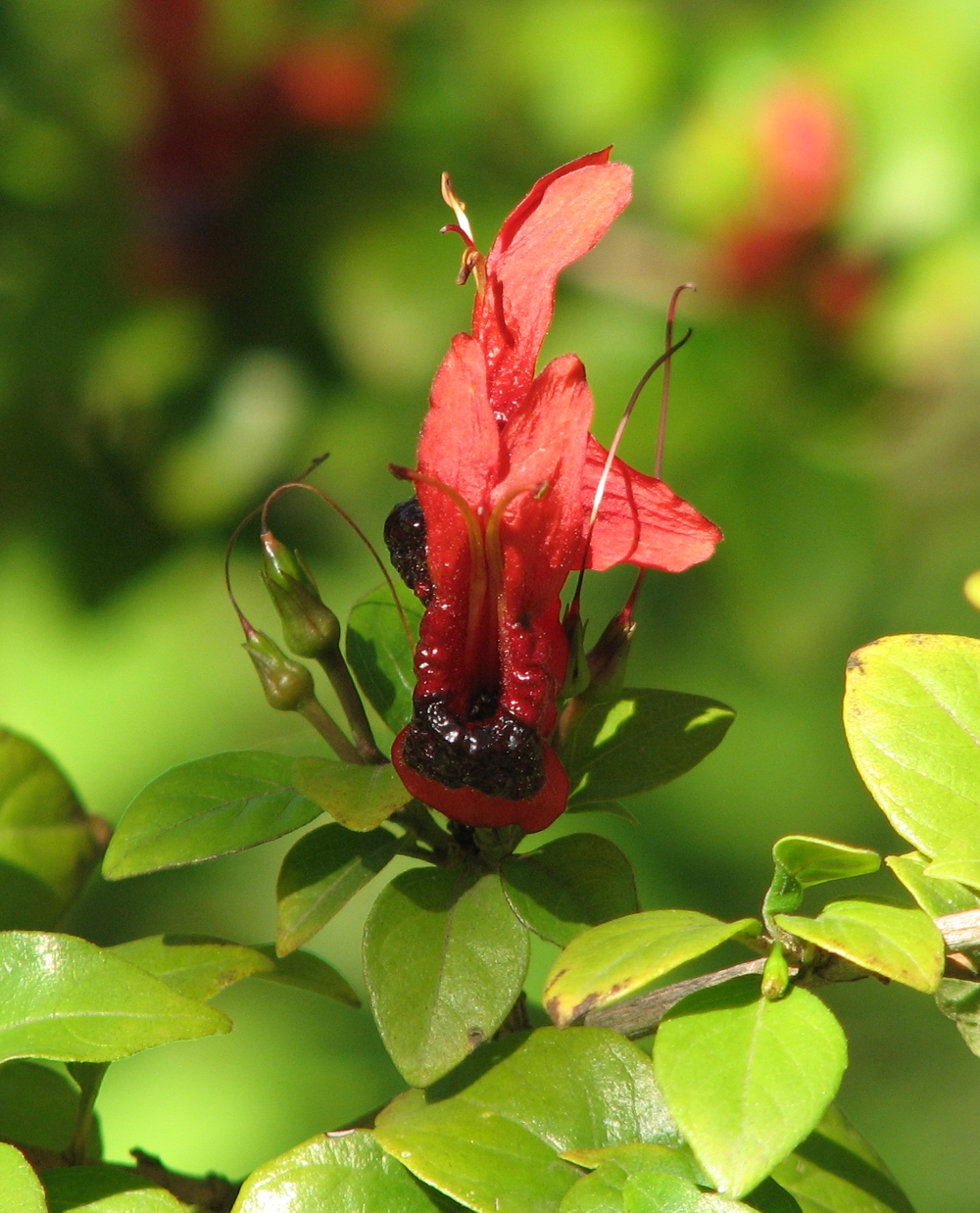
- Ruttya fruticosa

Scientific classification
- Kingdom: Plantae
- Clade: Tracheophytes
- Clade: Angiosperms
- Clade: Eudicots
- Clade: Asterids
- Order: Lamiales
- Family: Acanthaceae
- Subfamily: Acanthoideae
- Tribe: Justicieae
- Genus: Ruttya; Harv. (1842)

Species
- 6; see text

Synonyms
- Haplanthera Hochst. (1843)

= Ruttya =

Genus of flowering plants

Ruttya is a genus of plants in the family Acanthaceae. It includes six species native to eastern and southern Africa, Madagascar, and the southern Arabian Peninsula.

== Species ==
Six species are accepted.

- Ruttya bernieri Benoist – Madagascar
- Ruttya fragrans Benoist – Madagascar
- Ruttya fruticosa Lindau – northeastern tropical Africa and southern Arabian Peninsula
- Ruttya ovata Harv. – Mozambique, Eswatini, and South Africa
- Ruttya speciosa (Hochst.) Engl. – northern and northwestern Ethiopia
- Ruttya tricolor Benoist – Madagascar
