= Ottoman Baroque architecture =

Ottoman architectural style in the 18th and early 19th centuries

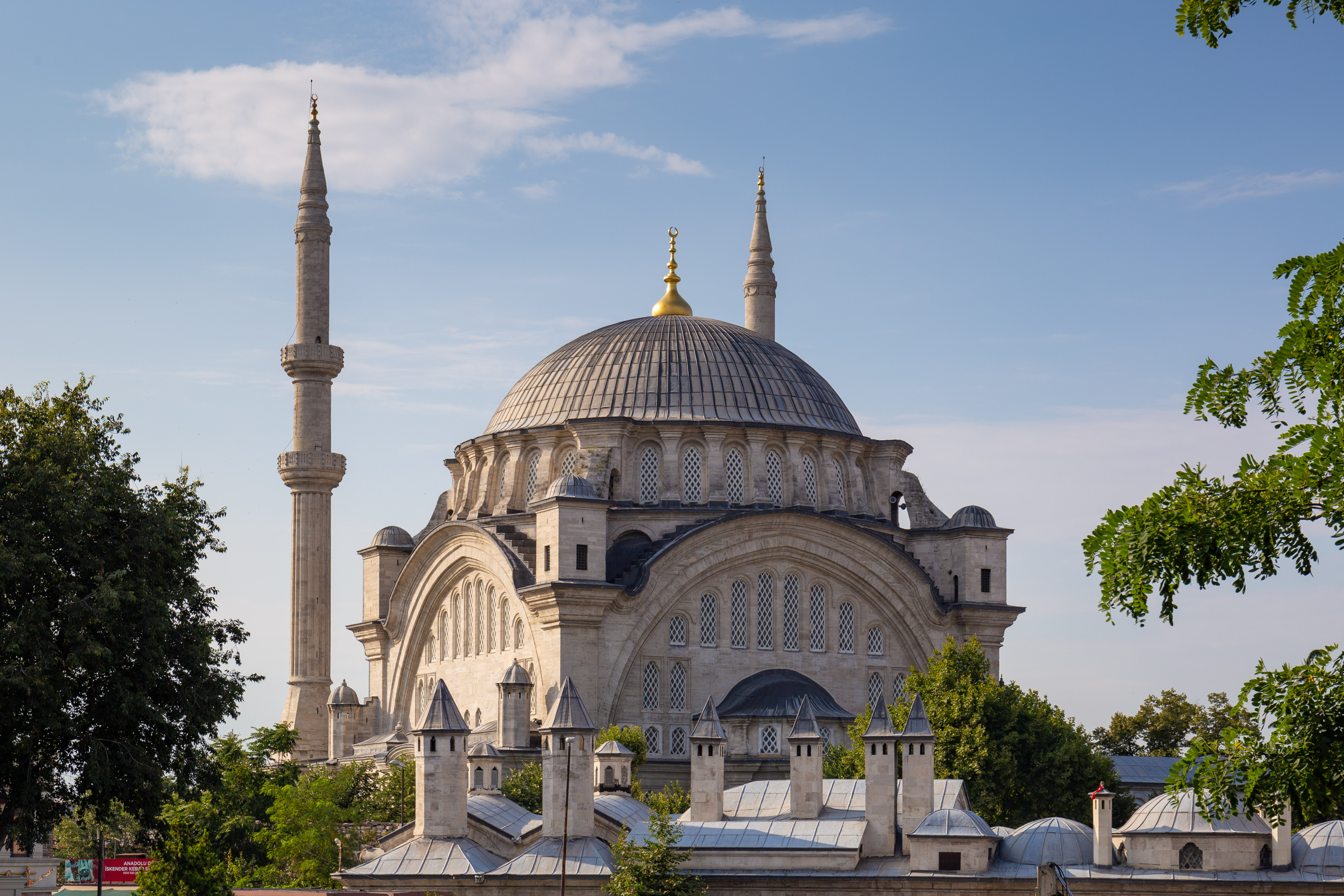
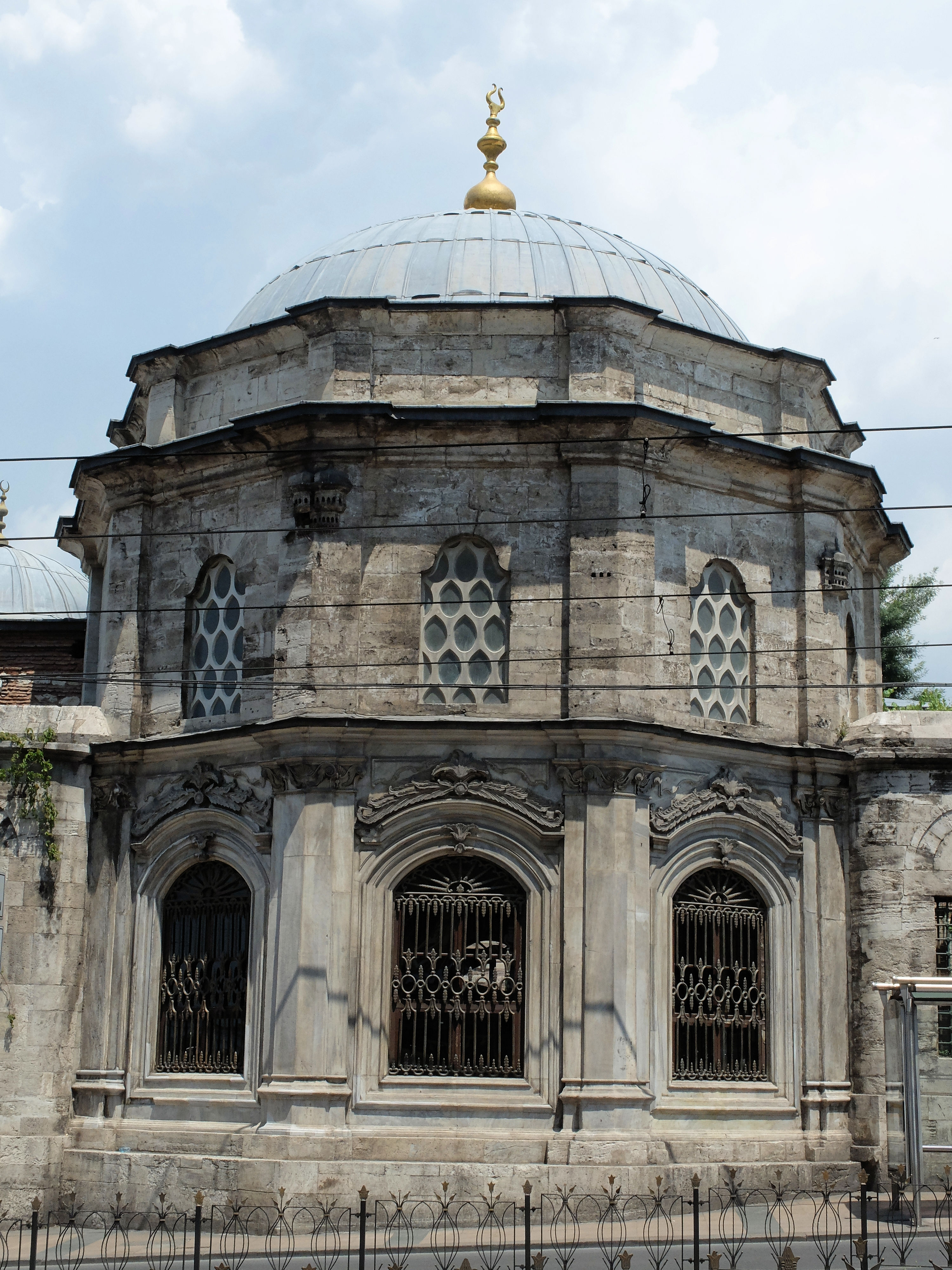
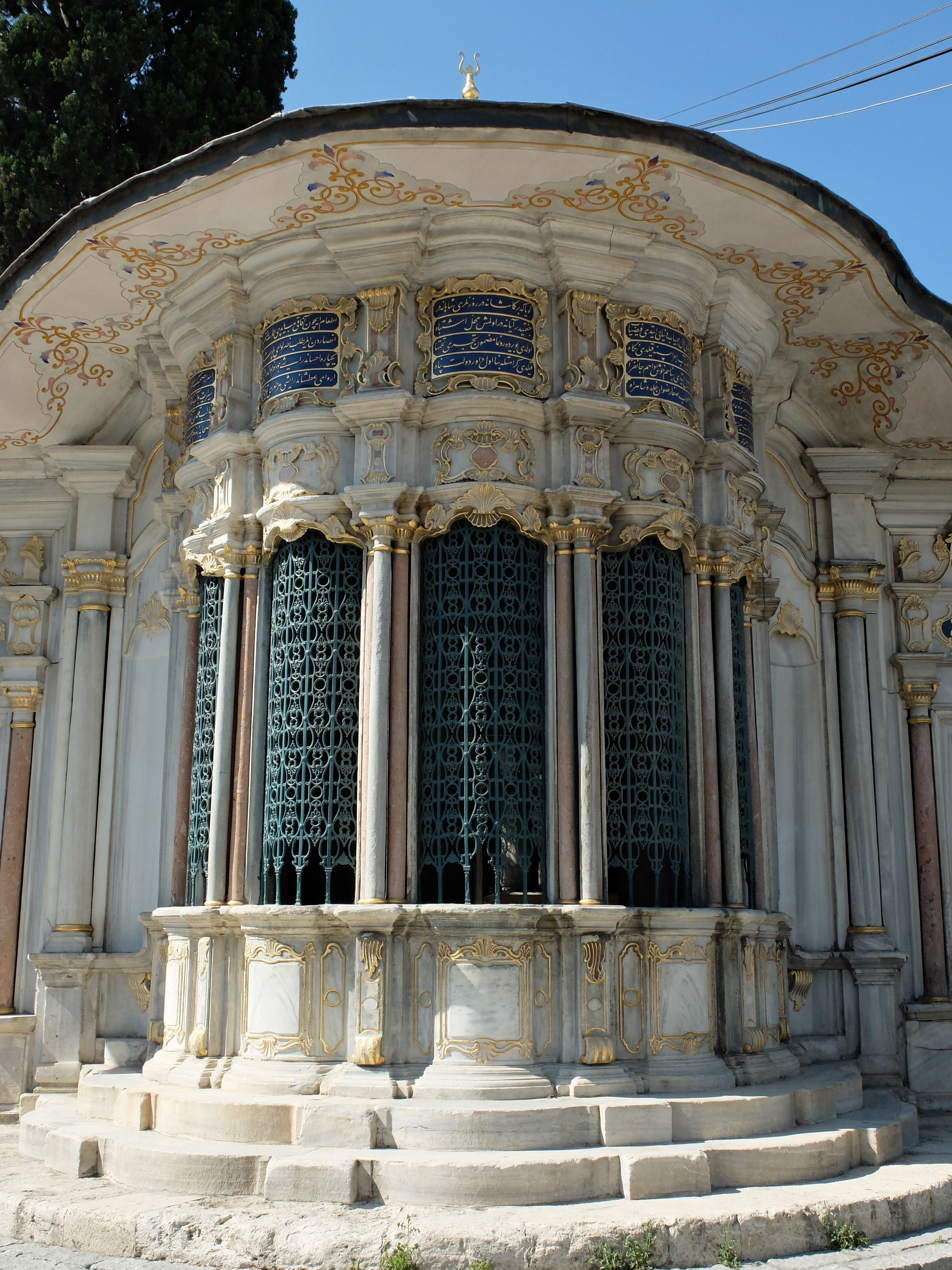
- Clockwise from top: Nuruosmaniye Mosque (1748–1755); Sebil of the Mihrişah Sultan Complex (1792–1796); Mausoleum of Mustafa III at the Laleli Mosque (1760–1764)
- Years active: 1740s to 1820s

Ottoman Baroque architecture, also known as Turkish Baroque, was a period in Ottoman architecture in the 18th century and early 19th century which was influenced by European Baroque architecture. Preceded by the changes of the Tulip Period and Tulip Period architecture, the style marked a significant departure from the classical style of Ottoman architecture and introduced new decorative forms to mostly traditional Ottoman building types. It emerged in the 1740s during the reign of Mahmud I (r. 1730–1754) and its most important early monument was the Nuruosmaniye Mosque, completed in 1755. Later in the 18th century, new building types were also introduced based on European influences. The last fully Baroque monuments, such as the Nusretiye Mosque, were built by Mahmud II (r. 1808–1839) in the early 19th century, but during this period new European-influenced styles were introduced and supplanted the Baroque.

== Background ==
From the 18th century onward, European influences were introduced into Ottoman architecture as the Ottoman Empire itself became more open to outside influences. During this period, the most predominant architectural style in Western Europe was the Baroque. In an Ottoman context, the term “Baroque” is sometimes applied more widely to Ottoman art and architecture across the 18th century including the Tulip Period. In more specific terms, however, the period after the 17th century is marked by several different styles. The Ottoman or Turkish "Baroque" style emerged in its full expression during the 1740s and rapidly replaced the style of the Tulip Period. This shift signaled the final end to the previous classical style which had dominated Ottoman architecture in the 16th and 17th centuries.

The political and cultural conditions which led to the Ottoman Baroque trace their origins in part to the Tulip Period, during the reign of Ahmed III, when the Ottoman ruling class opened itself to Western influence. After the Tulip Period, Ottoman architecture openly imitated European architecture, so that architectural and decorative trends in Europe were mirrored in the Ottoman Empire at the same time or after a short delay. Changes were especially evident in the ornamentation and details of new buildings rather than in their overall forms, though new building types were eventually introduced from European influences as well. The term "Turkish Rococo", or simply "Rococo", is also used to describe the Ottoman Baroque, or parts of it, due to the similarities and influences from the French Rococo style in particular, but this terminology varies from author to author.

== Developments ==
=== First Baroque monuments (1740s) ===
The first structures to exhibit the new Baroque style are several fountains and sebils built by elite patrons in Istanbul in 1741–1742: the fountain of Nisançı Ahmed Pasha added to the southwest wall of the Fatih Mosque cemetery, the Hacı Mehmet Emin Ağa Sebil near Dolmabahçe, and the Sa'deddin Efendi Sebil at the Karaca Ahmet Cemetery in Üsküdar. The Baroque-style Cağaloğlu Hamam in Istanbul was also built in the same year and was sponsored by Mahmud I, demonstrating that even the sultan promoted the style. The revenues of this hammam were earmarked for the Hagia Sophia (Ayasofya) Mosque, where Mahmud I built several new annexes and additions. These additions included a domed ablutions fountain in 1740–41 that is decorated with Baroque motifs but still maintains a traditional Ottoman form overall. More indicative of the new style is the imaret that Mahmud I added in the northeastern corner of Hagia Sophia's precinct in 1743. The imaret has an extravagantly Baroque gate which is carved with high-relief vegetal scrolls and a spiralling "swan-neck" pediment, flanked by marble columns with Corinthian-like capitals, and surmounted by wide eaves.

Godfrey Goodwin, a scholar of Ottoman architectural history, suggests that the külliye which most clearly demonstrates the transition between the old and new styles was the Beşir Ağa Mosque and its sebil, built in 1745 near the western perimeter of Topkapı Palace. Scholar Doğan Kuban states that Baroque motifs spread gradually from one architectural element to another, progressively replacing the sharper geometric decoration of the classical era with more dynamic curved forms such as the "S" and "C" curves and eventually with even more flamboyant European Baroque elements. Ünver Rüstem argues that the rapidity with which the style appeared across Istanbul after 1740 and the fact that the first Baroque structures were all commissioned by high-ranking elites should be interpreted as a deliberate effort by the sultan and his court to promote the new style.

Early Baroque monuments

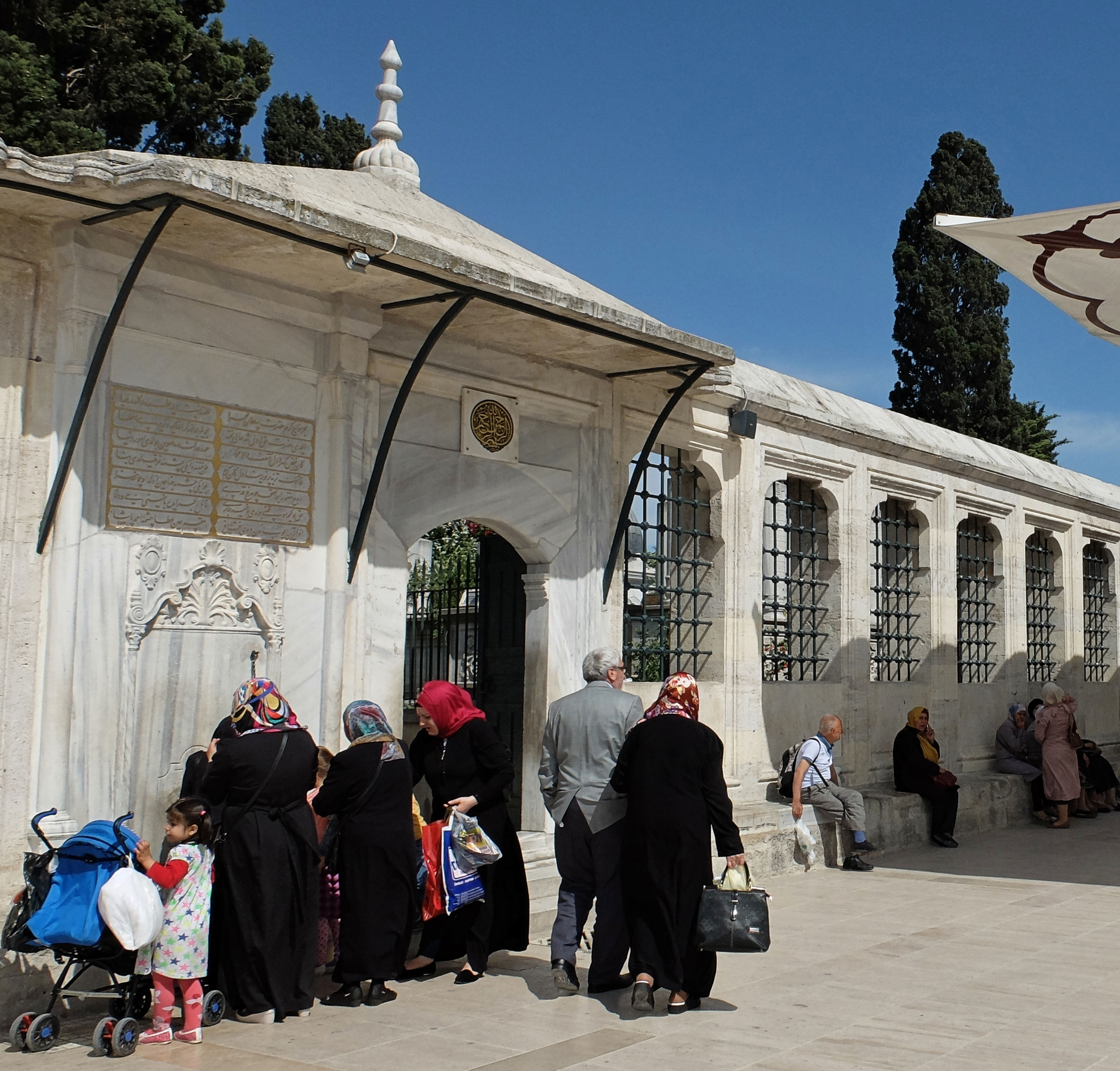
Entrance to the Fatih Mosque's cemetery, with the Fountain of Nisançı Ahmed Pasha (1741–42) on the far left

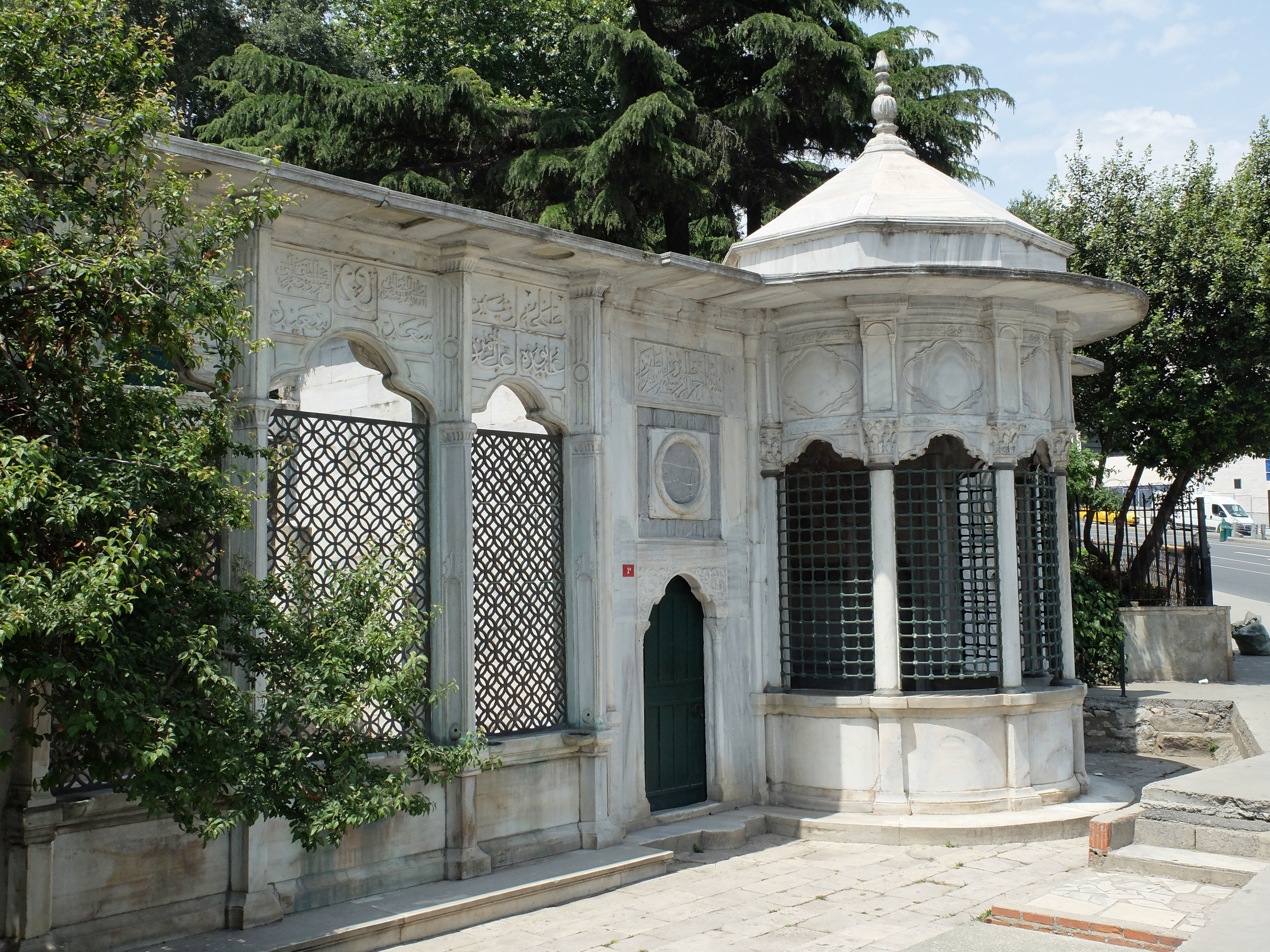
Hacı Mehmet Emin Ağa Sebil, Istanbul (1741–42)

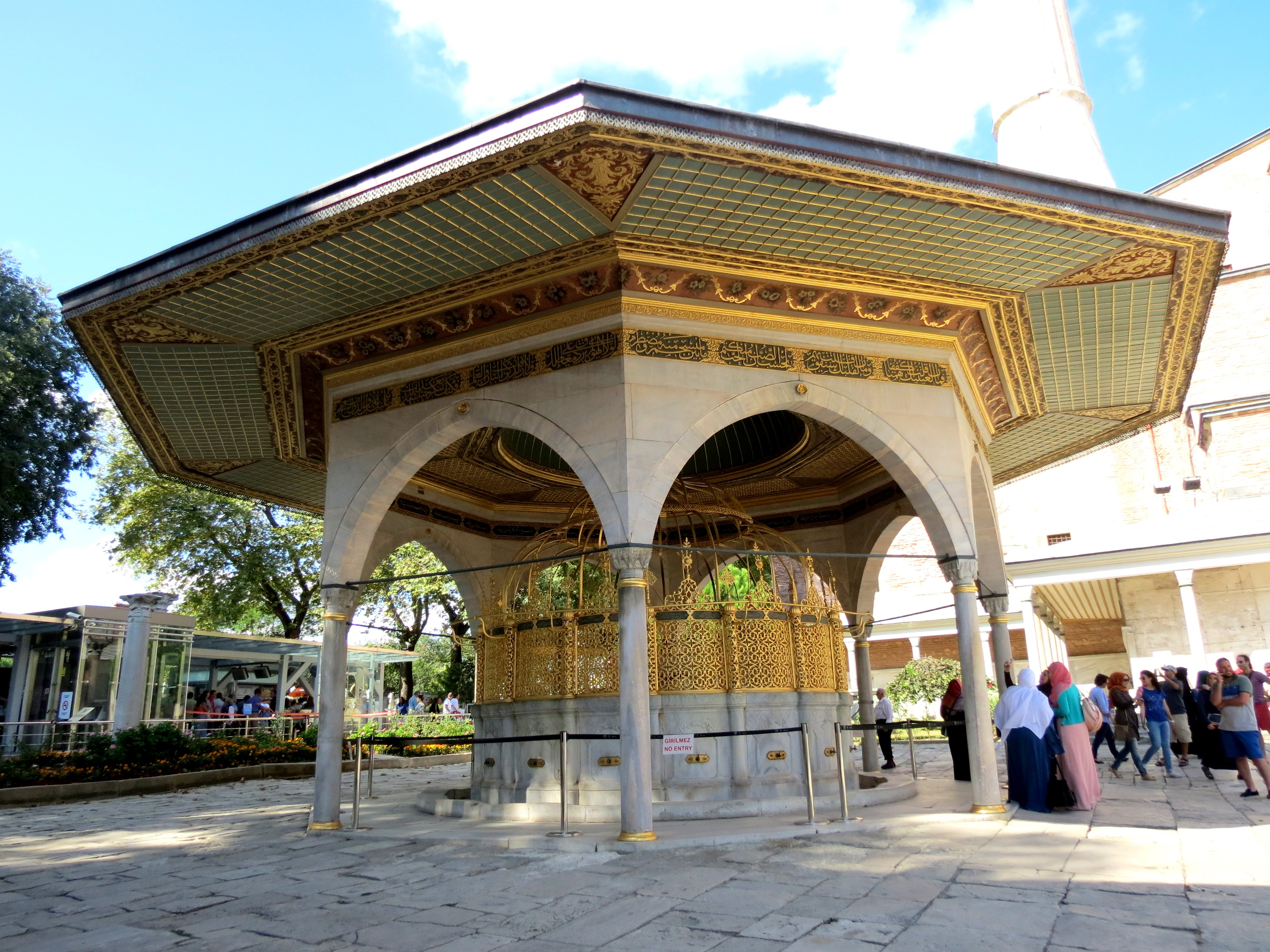
Fountain of Mahmud I at Hagia Sophia, Istanbul (1740–41)

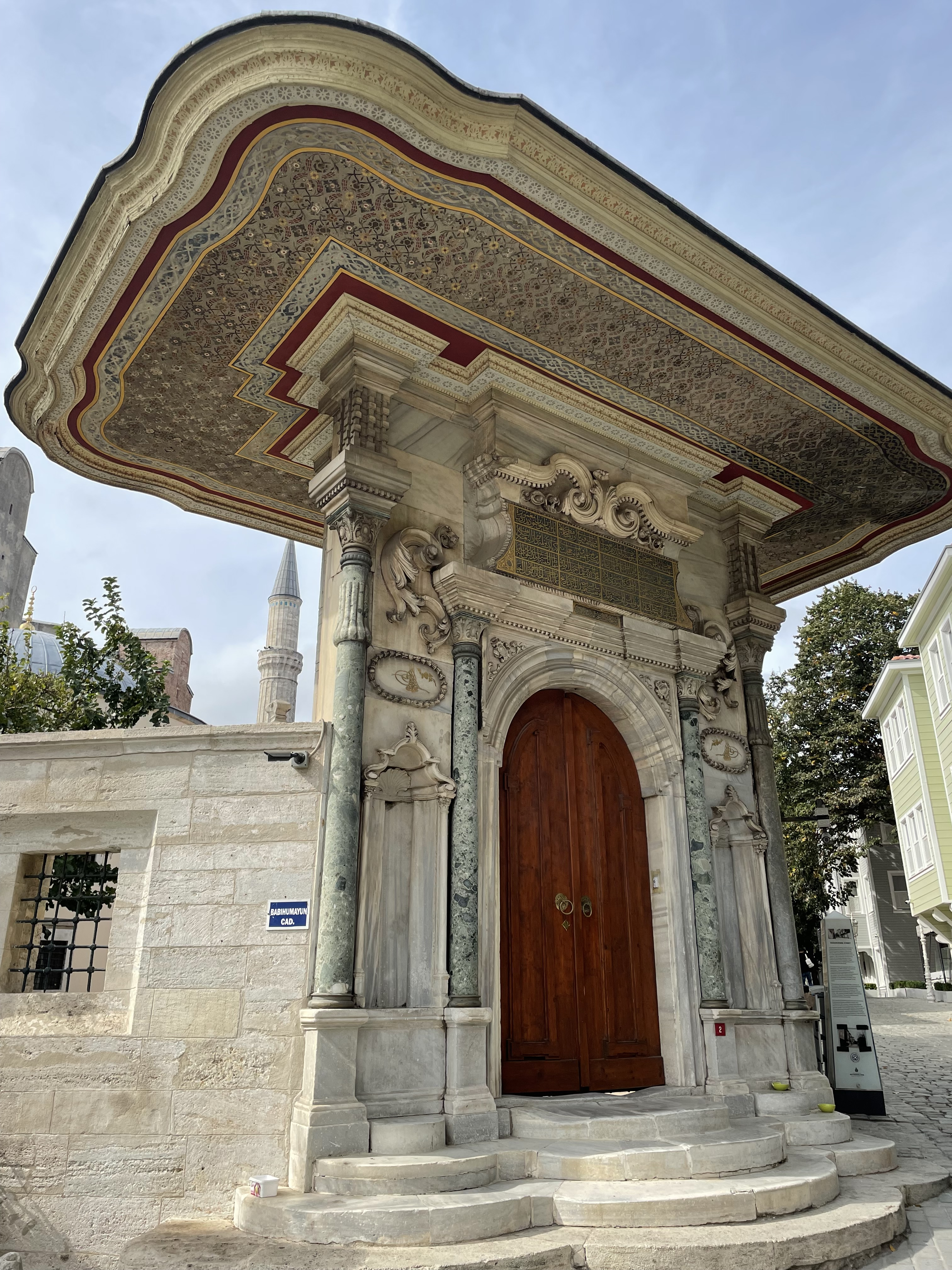
Gate to the imaret of Hagia Sophia, Istanbul (1743)

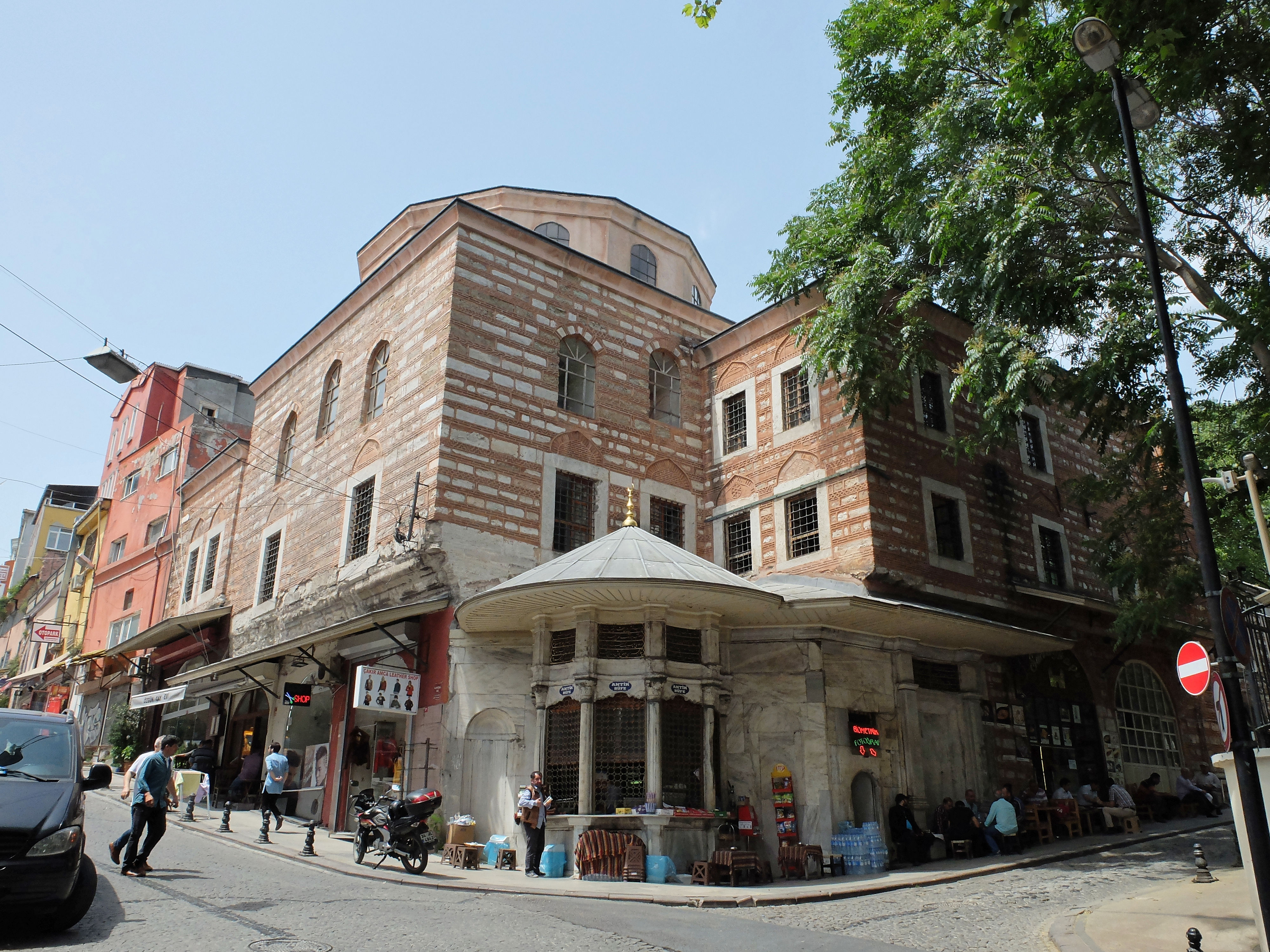
Beşir Ağa Mosque and sebil, Istanbul (1745)

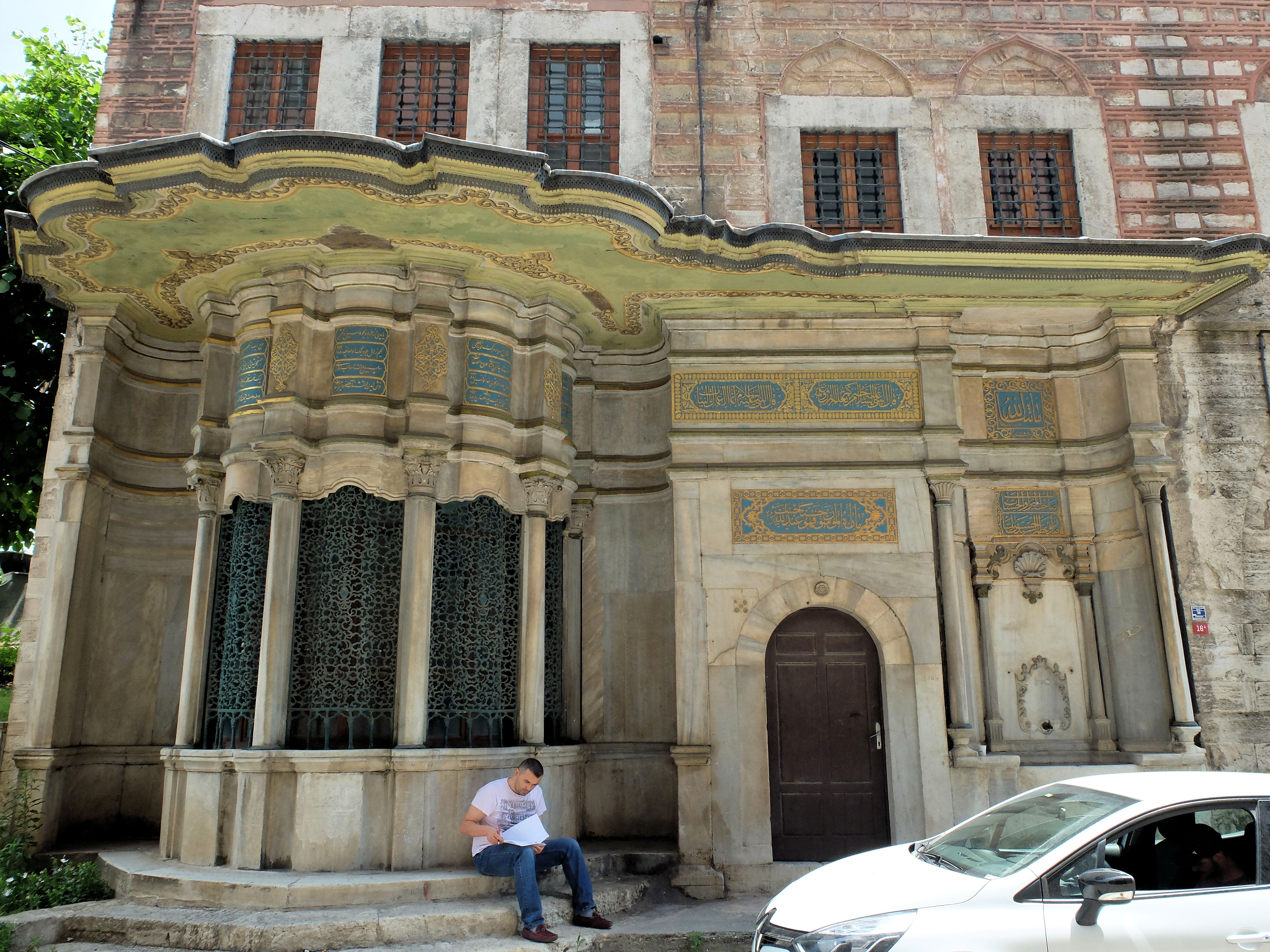
Sebil of the Seyyid Hasan Pasha complex, Istanbul (1745)

=== The Nuruosmaniye complex ===
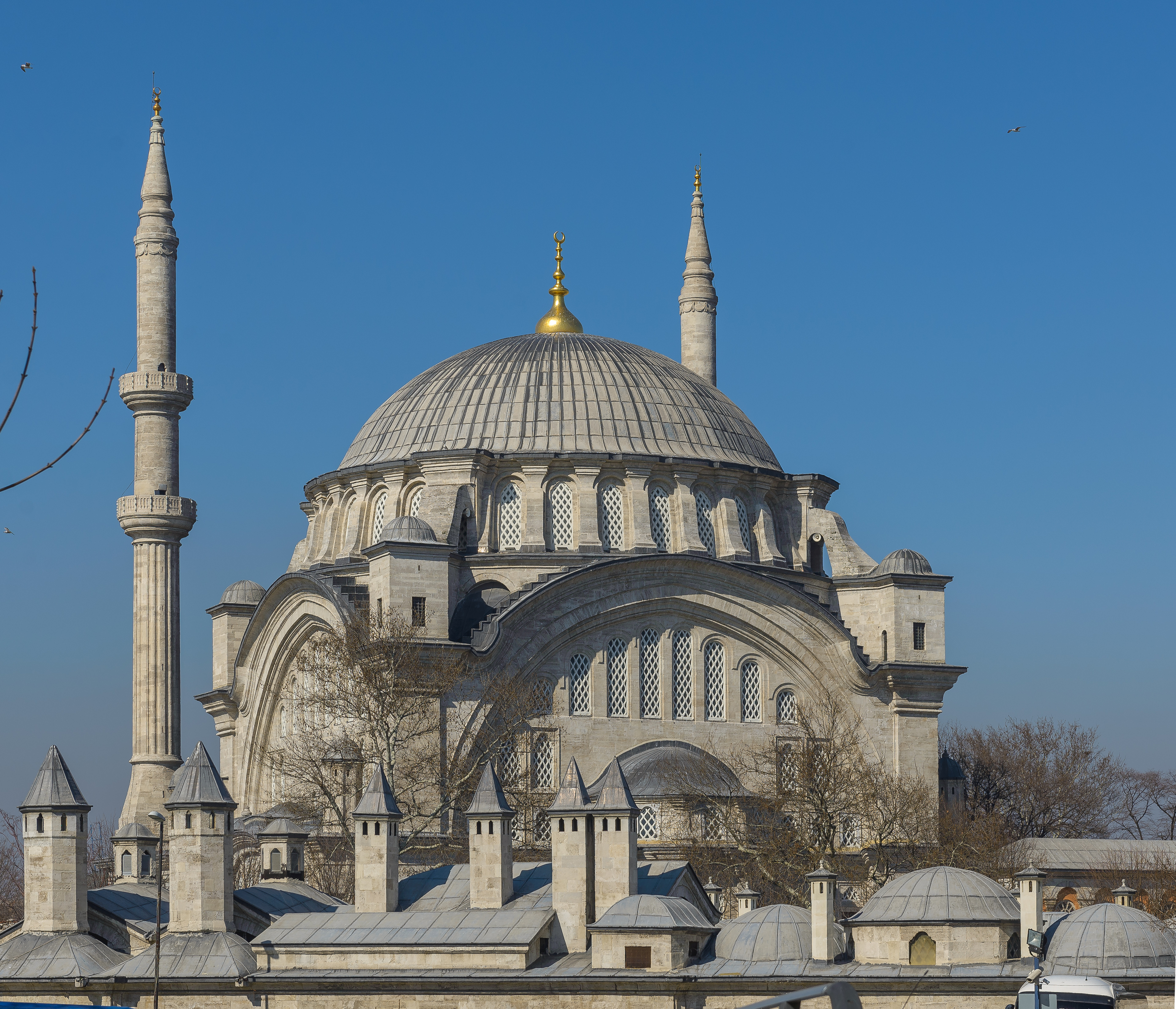
Nuruosmaniye Mosque, Istanbul (completed in 1755)

The most important monument heralding the new Ottoman Baroque style is the Nuruosmaniye Mosque complex, begun by Mahmud I in October 1748 and completed by his successor, Osman III (to whom it is dedicated), in December 1755. Kuban describes it as the "most important monumental construction after the Selimiye Mosque in Edirne", marking the integration of European culture into Ottoman architecture and the rejection of the classical Ottoman style. It also marked the first time since the Sultan Ahmed I Mosque (early 17th century) that an Ottoman sultan built his own imperial mosque complex in Istanbul, thus inaugurating the return of this tradition. Historical sources attest that the architect in charge was a Christian master carpenter named Simeon or Simon. Simeon's chief assistant was a Christian man named Kozma and the majority of the stonemasons under him were Christians as well. Both Simeon and Kozma were given robes of honour by the grand vizier at the mosque's opening ceremony. Ünver Rüstem notes this may have been the first time Christian architects were officially honoured in this fashion at the inauguration of a mosque and that it reflected the growing status of Christian craftsmen during this era.

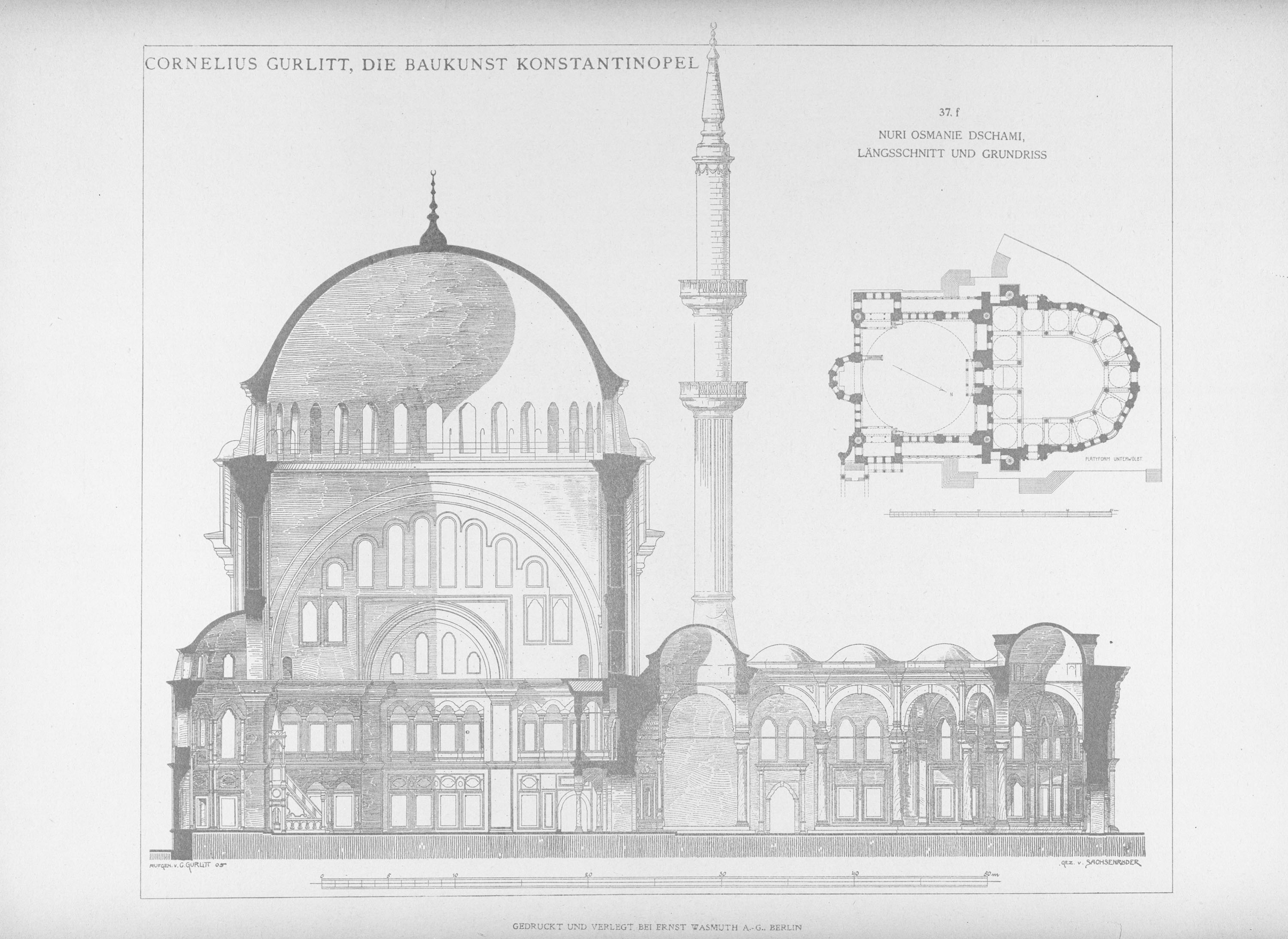
Elevation and floor plan of the Nuruosmaniye Mosque (from drawings by Cornelius Gurlitt)

The mosque consists of a square prayer hall surmounted by a large single dome with pendentives. The dome is one of the largest in Istanbul, measuring 25.75 meters in diameter. From the outside, the dome sits above four huge arches (one for each side of the square) pierced with many windows that provide light to the interior. The closest precedent to this design in classical Ottoman architecture is the Mihrimah Sultan Mosque in the Edirnekapi neighbourhood. The projecting apse which contains the mihrab is also comparable to the Selimiye Mosque in Edirne.

The details and decoration of the mosque are firmly Baroque. For example, the curving pediments above the exterior arches have concave flourishes at their edges, while the windows, doorways, and arches of the mosque have mixtilinear (i.e. combination of different curves) or round profiles instead of pointed arch profiles. The central doorway of the courtyard is topped by an unusual radiating sun motif carved in stone while the other doorways have pyramidal semi-vaults which, instead of the traditional muqarnas, are carved with many rows of acanthus-like friezes and other motifs – a composition that is neither Ottoman nor European in style. Even more unusual is the form of the mosque's courtyard, which is semielliptical instead of the traditional rectangular form.

Inside, the mosque's prayer hall is flanked by symmetrical two-story galleries that extend outside the main perimeter of the hall. The corners of these galleries, on either side of the mihrab area, include space for the muezzins on one side and for the sultan's loge on the other, thus dispensing with the traditional müezzin mahfili platform in the middle of the mosque. This gallery arrangement leaves the central space unencumbered while still dissimulating the supporting piers of the dome. The most exuberant Baroque carvings, such as flutes and scroll forms, are found on the minbar. The hood of the mihrab, like the semi-vaults above the exterior doorways, is carved with a mix of eclectic friezes that replace the traditional muqarnas. The mosque's stone decoration also establishes a new style of capitals that distinguishes the Ottoman Baroque: a vase or inverse bell shape, either plain or decorated, usually with small but prominent volutes at its corners, similar to Ionic capitals.

Like earlier imperial foundations, the mosque formed the center of a complex consisting of several buildings including a madrasa, an imaret, a library, a royal tomb, a sebil and fountain, and an imperial pavilion (Hünkâr Kasır), most of which are equally Baroque. The sebil and fountain that flank the western gate of the complex have curved and flamboyant forms counterbalanced by the plain walls around them, which Goodwin calls the "epitome of the baroque" style for these features. The library in the northeastern corner is distinguished by undulating curves and a roughly elliptical interior. The tomb, which houses the remains of Şehsuvar Sultan, has ornate moldings and concave cornices.

At the eastern corner of the mosque is an L-shaped structured which consists of a covered ramp leading to an imperial pavilion. This kind of feature first appeared in the 17th century with the Sultan Ahmed I Mosque and was further exemplified by the Hünkâr Kasrı of the New Mosque in Eminönü. At the Nuruosmaniye, however, this pavilion is more detailed, more prominent, and more deliberately integrated into the rest of the complex. It was used as a private lounge or reception area (selamlık) for the sultan when visiting the mosque and gave him direct access to the sultan's loge inside the mosque. Because such imperial pavilions were closer to the public eye than the imperial palace, they played a role in enhancing the sultan's public presence and in staging some public ceremonies. Accordingly, the construction of imperial pavilions as part of imperial mosques aligned itself with the cultural shift taking place in the 18th century around the sultan's official displays of power, and such imperial pavilions became ever more prominent in later imperial mosques.

Details of the Nuruosmaniye complex

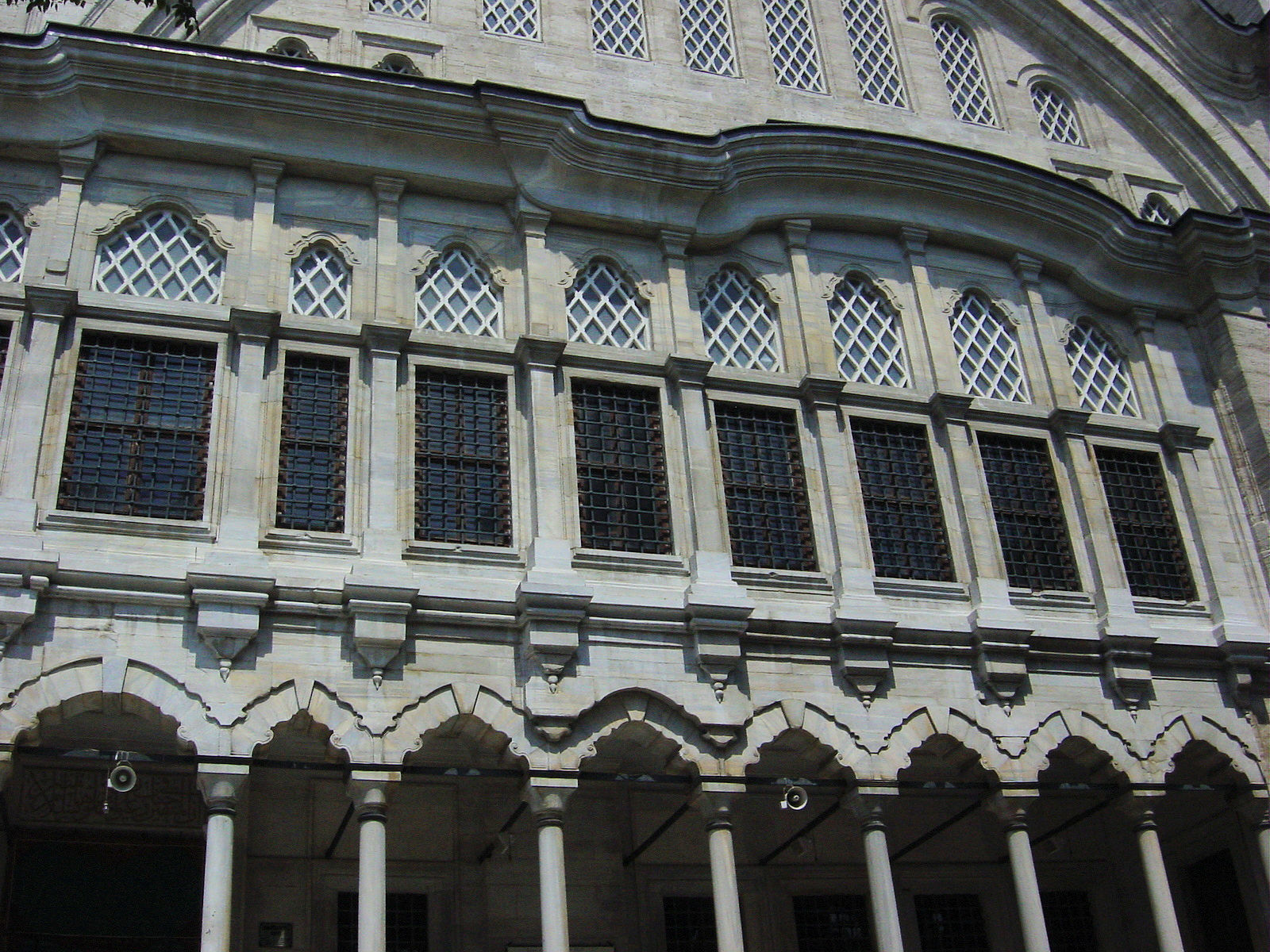
Mixtilinear arches in the lateral portico and windows of the mosque

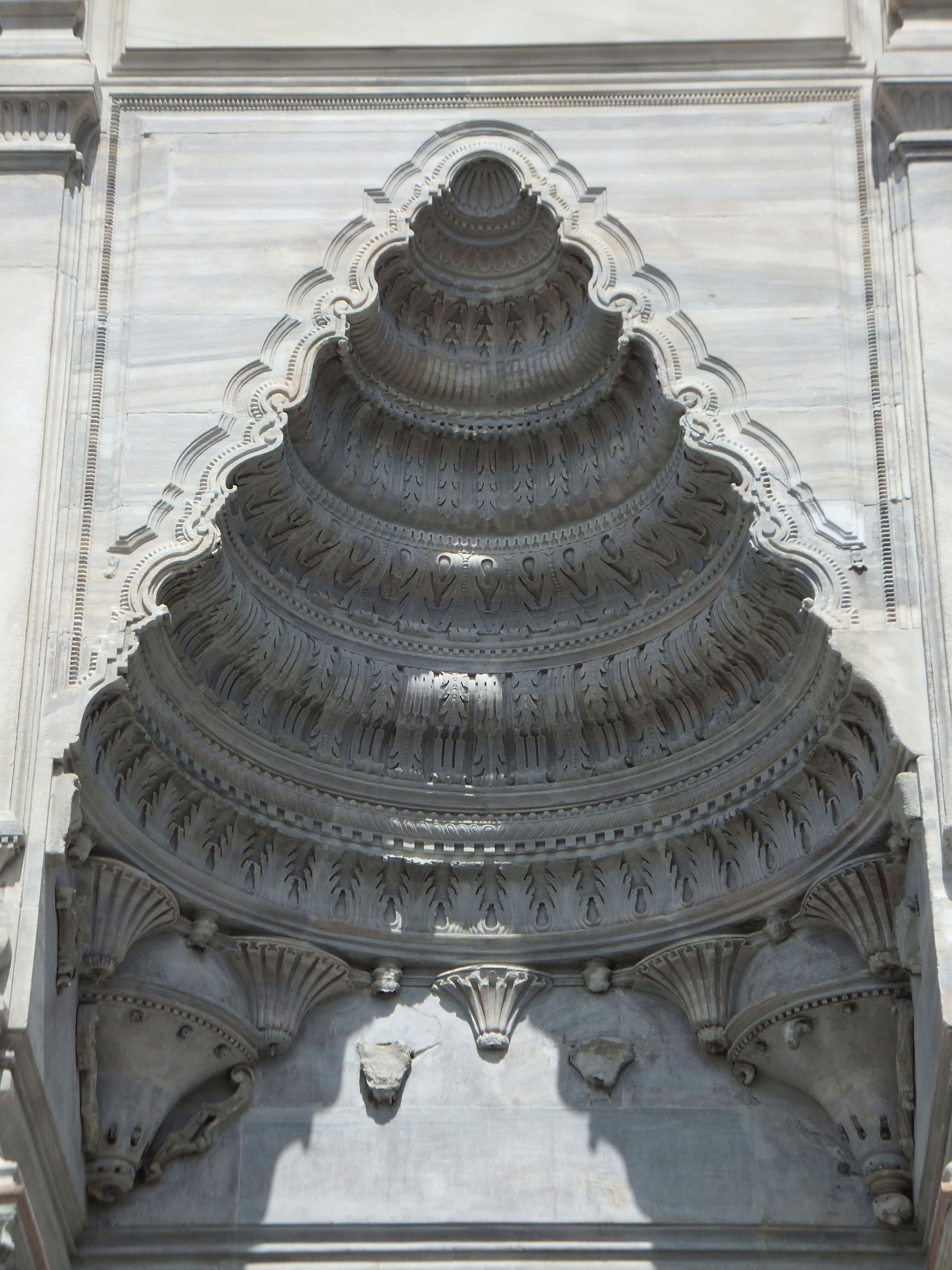
Semi-vault above one of the mosque entrances, with Baroque friezes replacing muqarnas

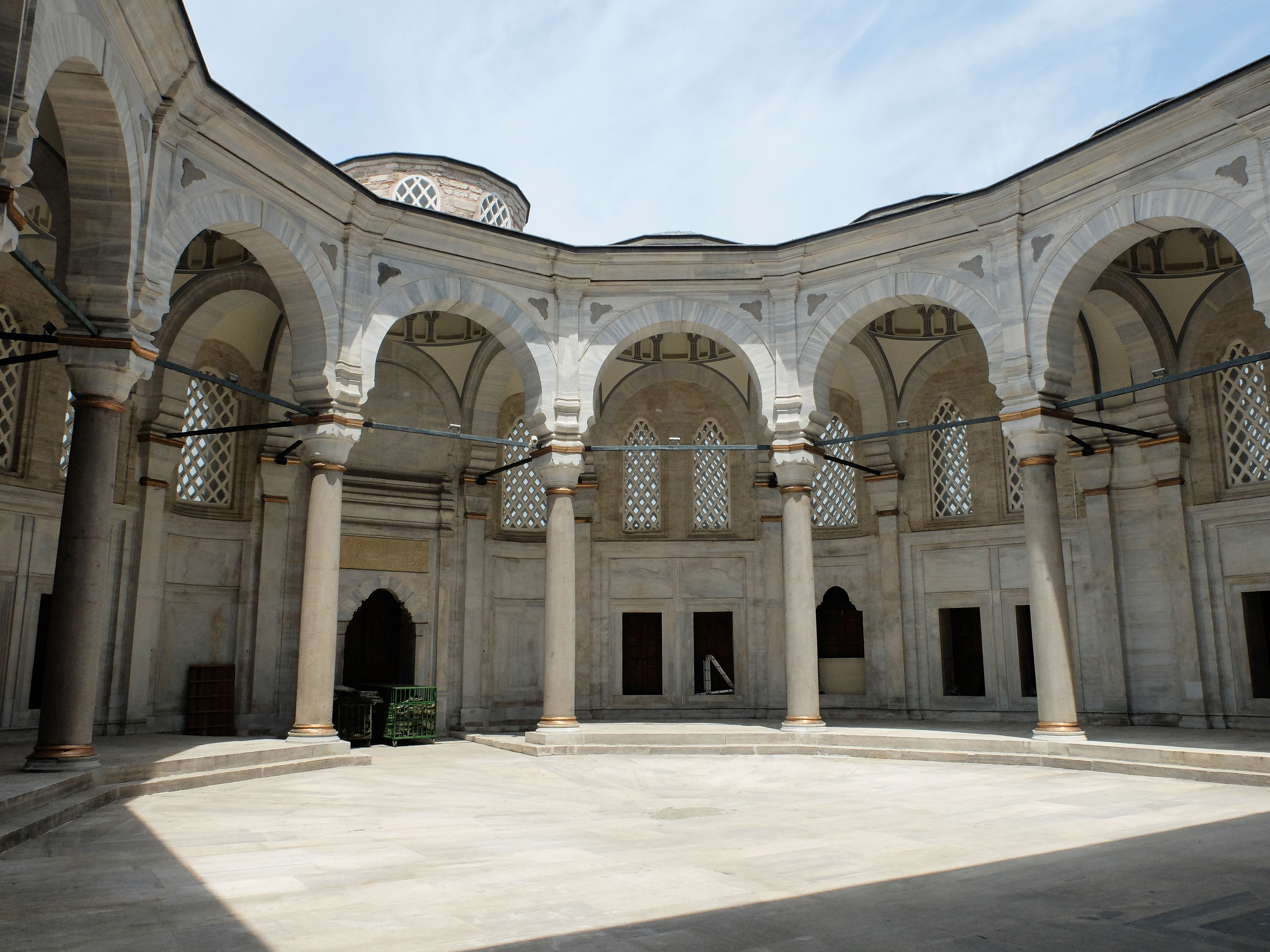
Courtyard of the mosque

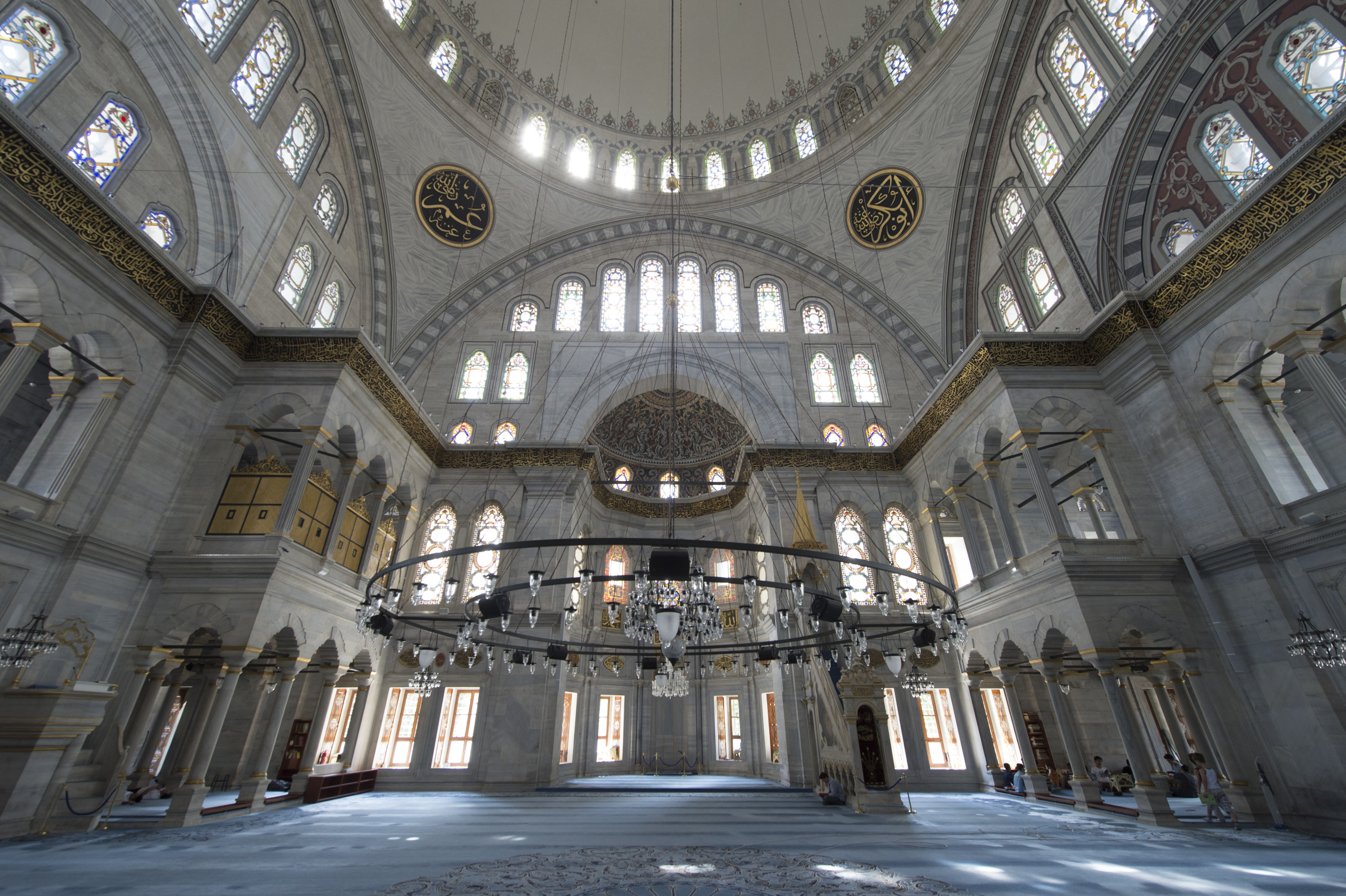
Interior of the mosque

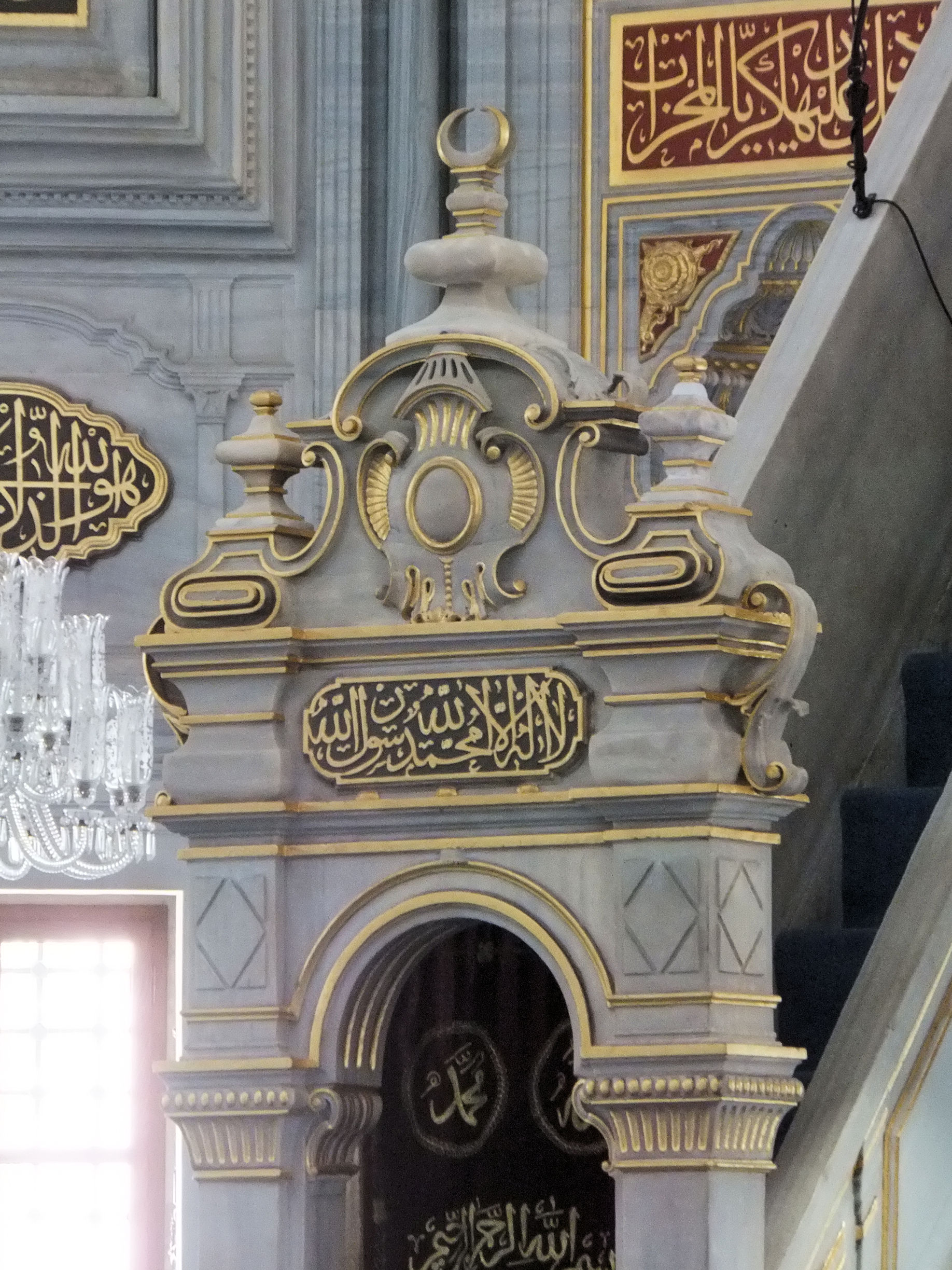
Baroque details of the minbar inside the mosque

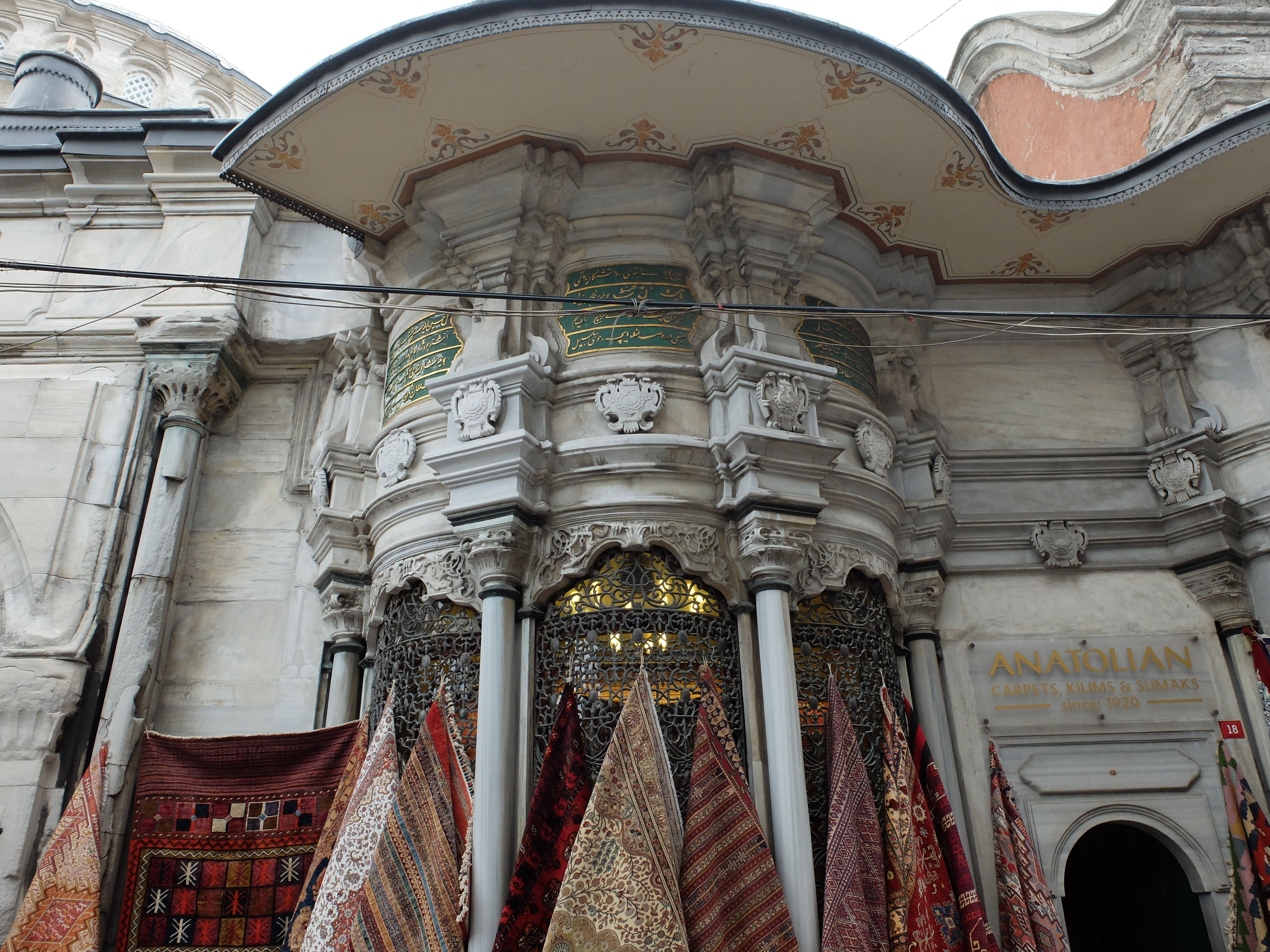
Sebil of the complex

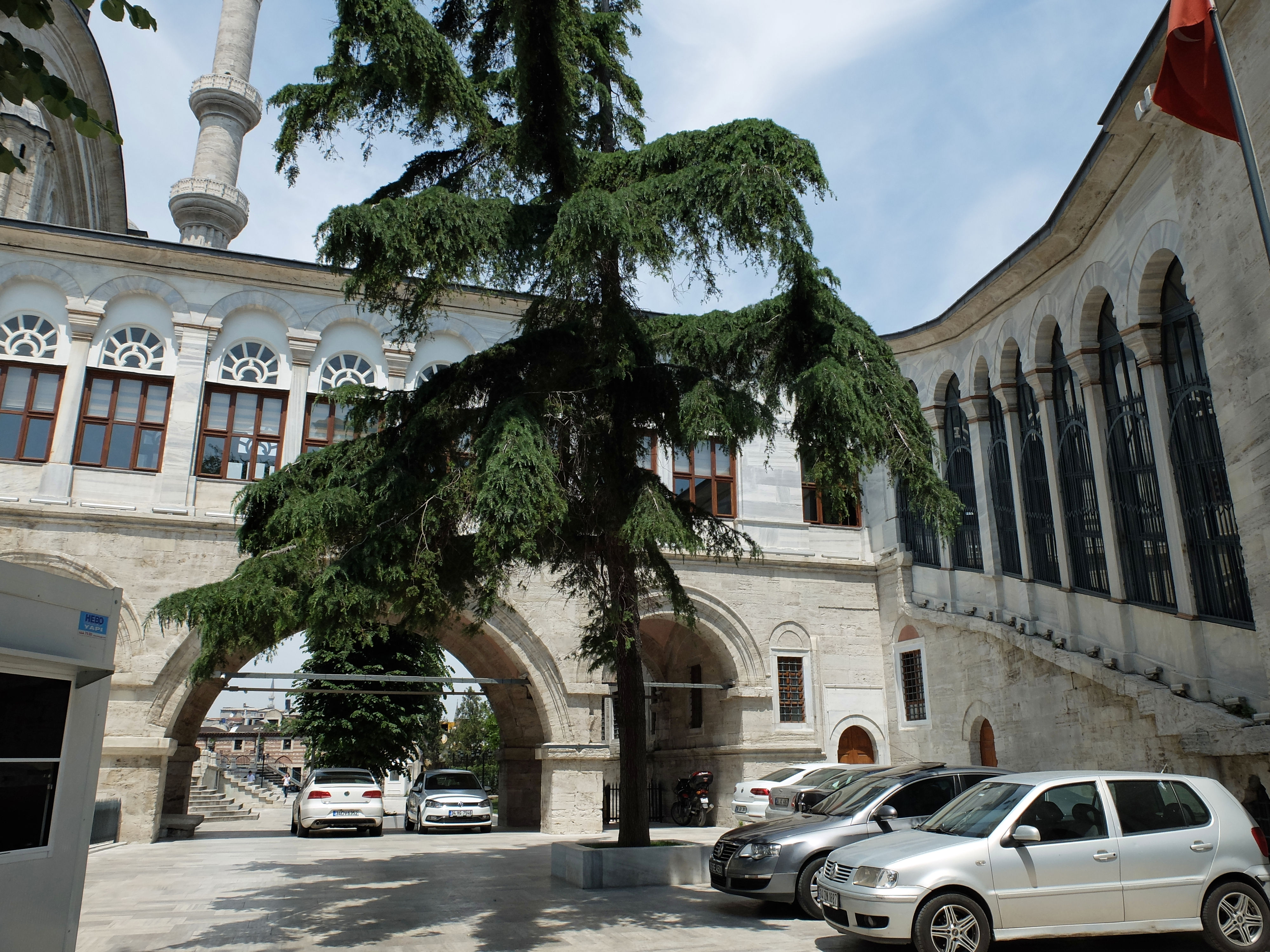
Imperial pavilion: a ramp on the right leads to a private lounge connected to the mosque on the left

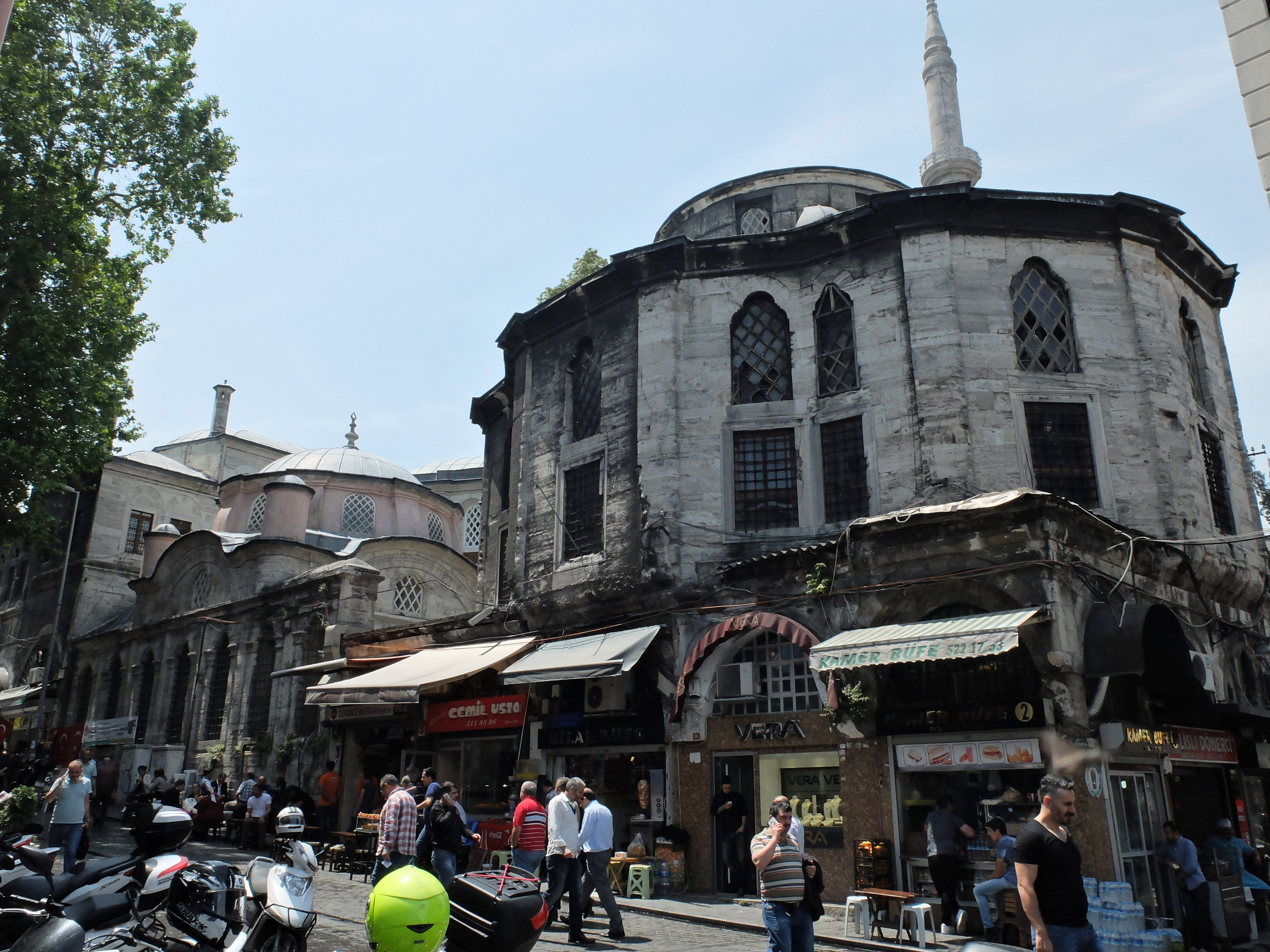
The tomb (left) and library (right) of the complex

=== Reign of Mustafa III ===
Mustafa III (r. 1757–1774), successor of Osman II and a son of Ahmed III, engaged in many building activities during his long reign. His first foundation was the Ayazma Mosque in Üsküdar in honour of his mother. Construction began in 1757–1758 and finished in 1760–1761. It is essentially a smaller version of the Nuruosmaniye Mosque, signalling the importance of the Nuruosmaniye as a new model to emulate. It is richly decorated with Baroque carved stonework, especially in the mihrab and minbar. While the mosque is smaller than the Nuruosmaniye, it is relatively tall for its proportions, enhancing its sense of height. This trend towards height was pursued in later mosques such as the Nusretiye Mosque. The Ayazma Mosque differs from others mainly in the unique arrangement of its front façade, which consists of a five-arched portico reached by a wide semi-circular staircase. This arrangement is similar to another contemporary mosque built in Aydın in 1756, the Cihanoğlu Mosque. The latter is also an example of Baroque elements appearing outside Istanbul in the mid century. One minor detail of the Ayazma Mosque that was recurrent in the 18th century is the small birdhouse carved in stone on the exterior. Such birdhouses were made in the preceding century but in the Baroque period they become more ornate and are commonly attached to the exteriors of both religious and civil buildings.

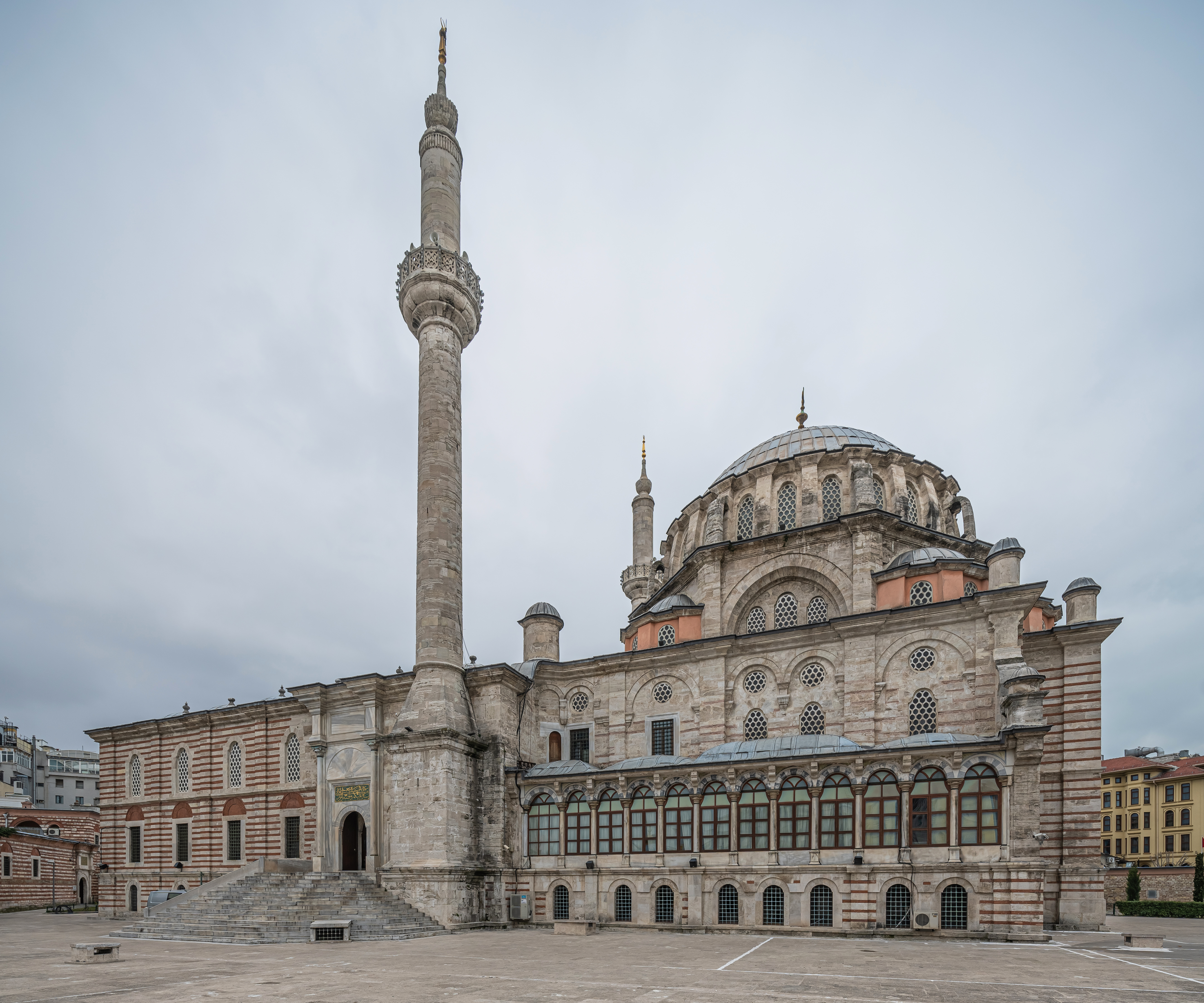
Laleli Mosque in Istanbul (1760–1764)

Mustafa III's own imperial mosque was built in the center of Istanbul and is known as the Laleli Mosque. Its construction began in 1760 and finished in 1764. Its architect was Mehmed Tahir Agha. Due to the sultan's personal wishes, its form is based on that of the Selimiye Mosque in Edirne, consisting of a main dome supported by eight piers and four corner semi-domes, thus differing significantly from the Nuruosmaniye's design. However, unlike the Selimiye Mosque, the piers are more slender and are mostly integrated directly into the walls. The mosque's courtyard is rectangular again, leaving the Nuruosmaniye's semi-elliptical courtyard as an experiment that was not repeated. The decoration is also firmly Baroque, with Ionic-like capitals, round and mixtilinear arches, a mihrab similar to the Nuruosmaniye's, and other Baroque motifs. The result is a mosque that incorporates the visual style of the Nuruosmaniye in a more restrained way and integrates it more closely with traditional Ottoman architecture.

The Laleli Mosque is surrounded by the usual annexes: imperial pavilion, sebil, madrasa, imaret and the tomb of Mustafa III. More unique, though, is the large artificial platform on which the mosque stands. The substructure of this platform contains a vaulted hall that was originally used as a storehouse and is now occupied by a market. The complex also includes a caravanserai, the Çukurçeşme Han or Taş Han, which contributed to the mosque's revenues. Mustafa III also built another caravanserai, the Büyük Yeni Han, at around the same time (in 1764) in the city's central commercial district. It is Istanbul's second-largest caravanserai. Both caravanserais are centred around long rectangular courtyards, which was a trend for these types of buildings in this period.

The Laleli Mosque is also notable for its apparent Byzantine influences. The walls of the mosque's exterior and the walls of its courtyard are constructed in alternating layers of white stone and red brick. This technique was used in early Ottoman constructions but it was largely absent in the later imperial mosques of Istanbul. Along with the use of coloured marble decoration inside the mosque, this feature may have been a deliberate callback to the city's ancient Byzantine monuments. This "Byzantinising" trend was not commonplace but did occur in other monuments during the Baroque period. For example, the Mosque of Zeyneb Sultan (Mustafa III's sister), built in 1769, exhibits an even stronger Byzantine appearance. According to Ünver Rüstem, this phenomenon may reflect a certain introspection among Ottoman architects of the time about the city's past and about the connection between Ottoman architecture and Byzantine architecture. This was abetted by the fact that some Baroque motifs evoked forms and motifs that are also found in Byzantine architecture, including the Hagia Sophia.

A sense of historical consciousness or historicism in Ottoman architecture of the time may be also evident in Mustafa III's reconstruction of the Fatih Mosque after the 1766 earthquake that partially destroyed it. The new Fatih Mosque was completed in 1771 and it neither reproduced the appearance of the original 15th-century building nor followed the contemporary Baroque style. It was instead built in a Classical Ottoman style modelled on the 16th-century Şehzade Mosque built by Sinan – whose design had in turn been repeated in major 17th-century mosques like the Sultan Ahmed I Mosque and the New Mosque. This probably indicates that contemporary builders saw the new Baroque style as inappropriate for the appearance of an ancient mosque embedded in the mythology of the city's 1453 conquest. At the same time, it showed that Sinan's architecture was associated with the Ottoman golden age and thus appeared as an appropriate model to imitate, despite the anachronism. By contrast, however, the nearby tomb of Mehmed II, which was rebuilt at the same time, is in a fully Baroque style.

Architecture under Mustafa III

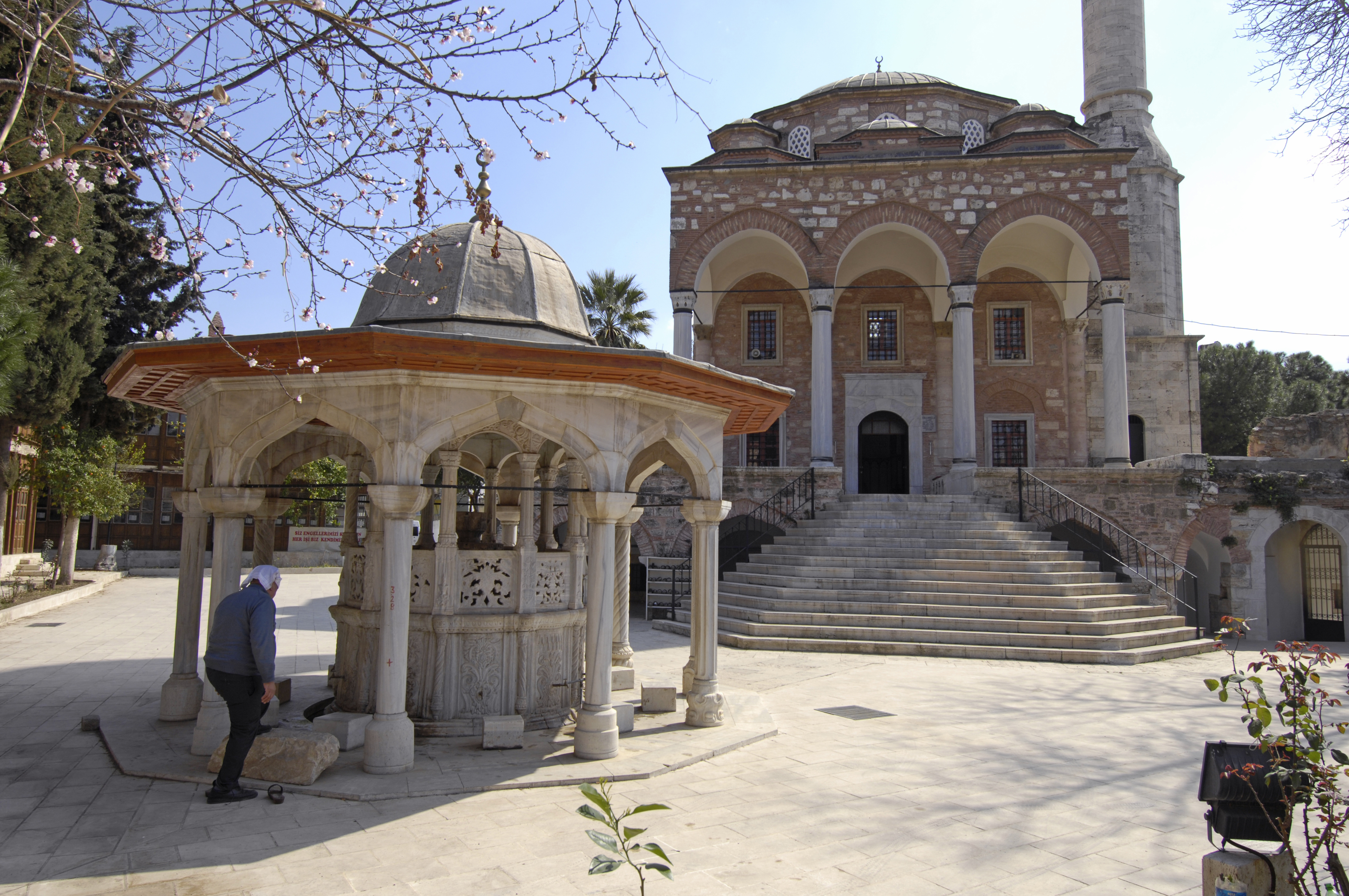
Cihanoğlu Mosque in Aydın (1756)

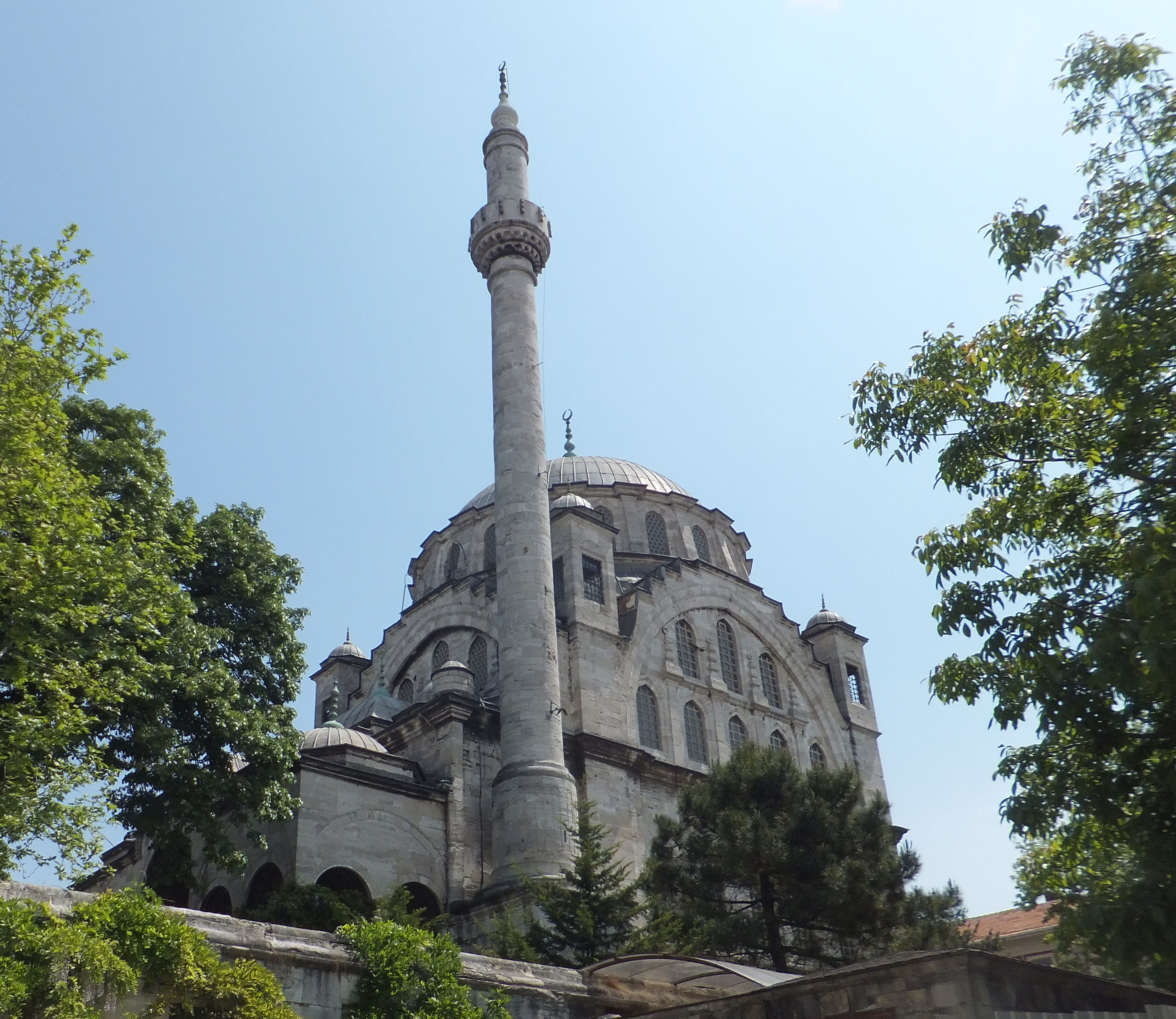
Ayazma Mosque in Üsküdar (1757–1761)

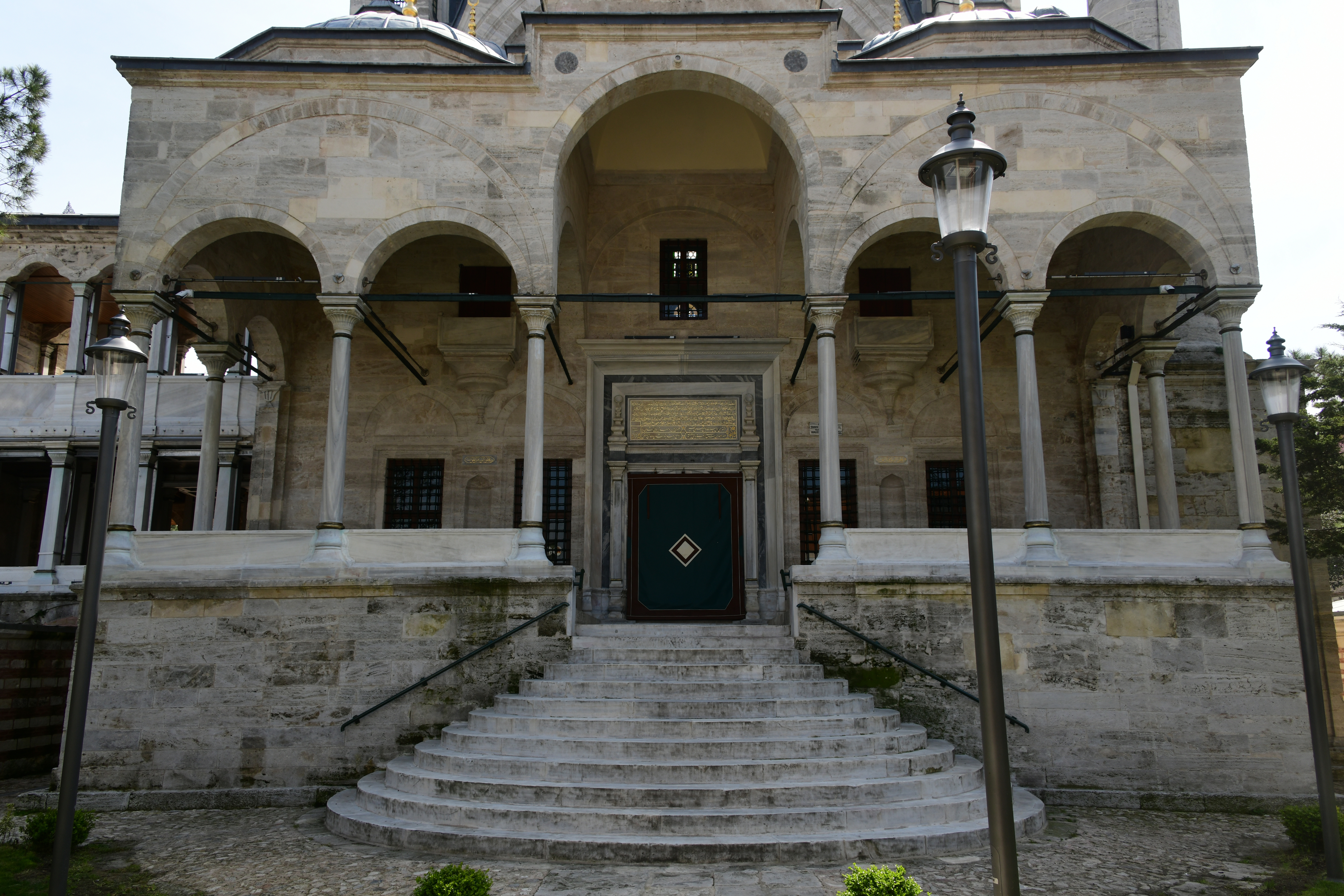
Front porch of the Ayazma Mosque

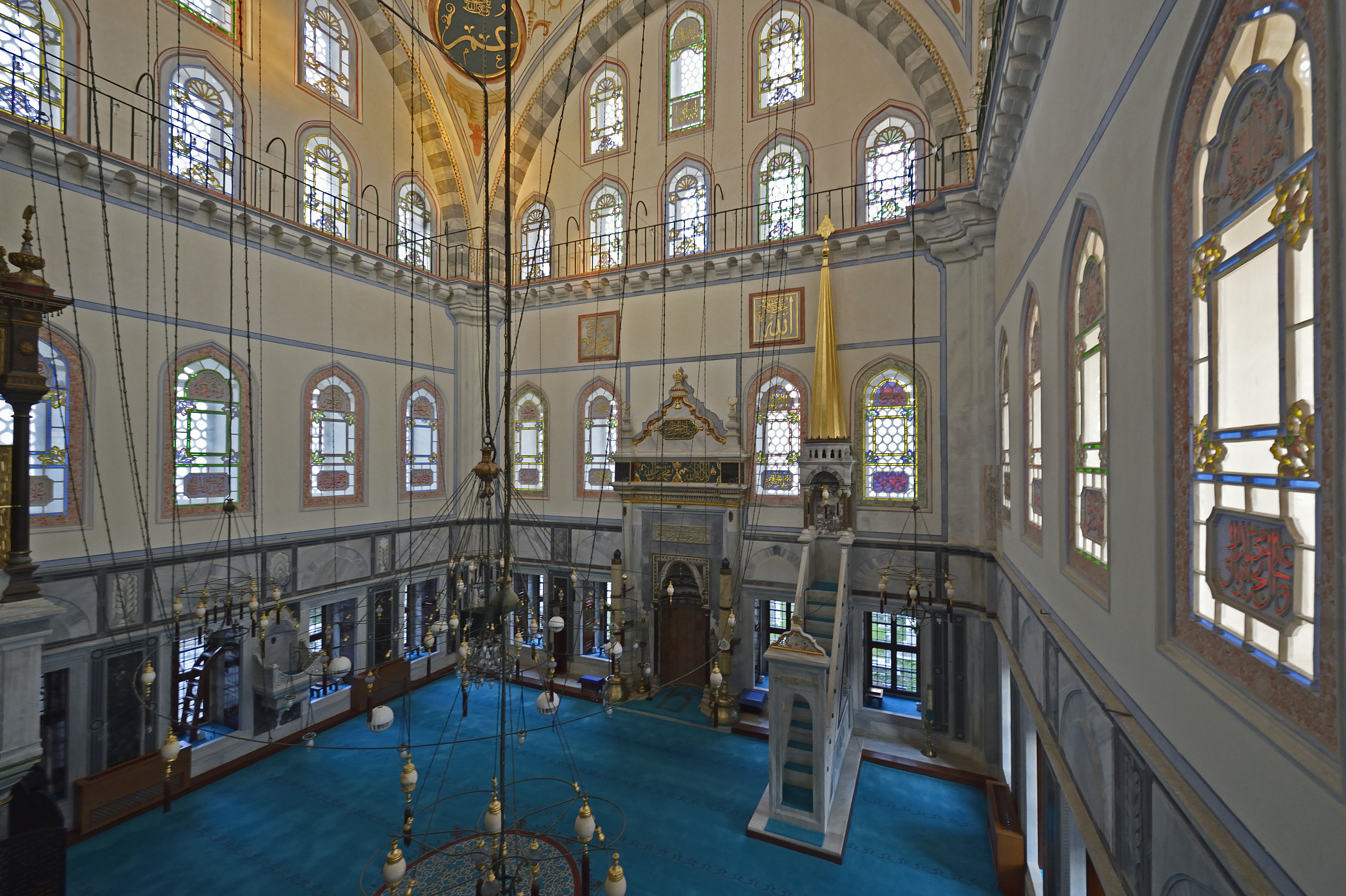
Interior of the Ayazma Mosque

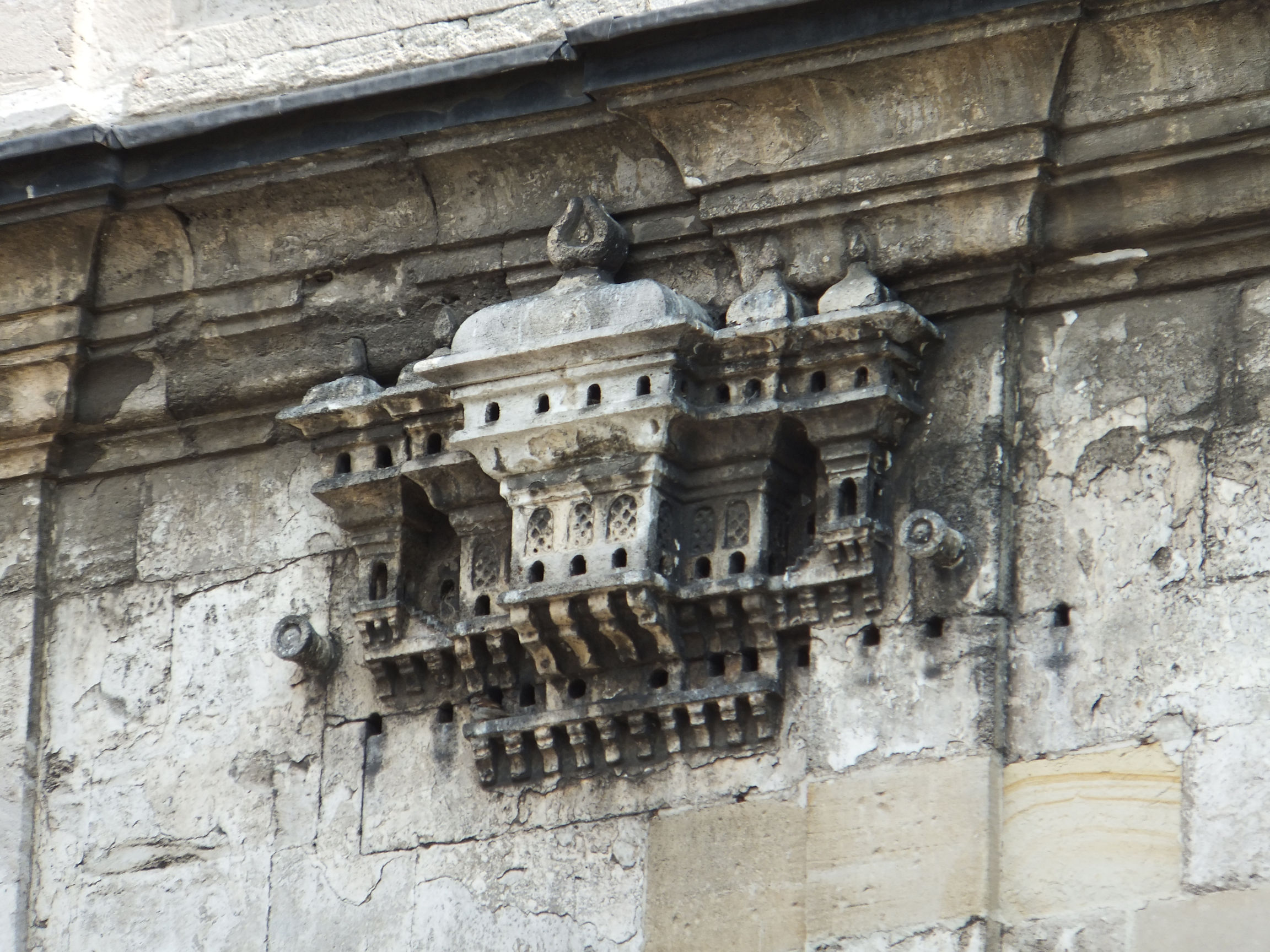
Example of 18th-century birdhouse on the exterior of the Ayazma Mosque

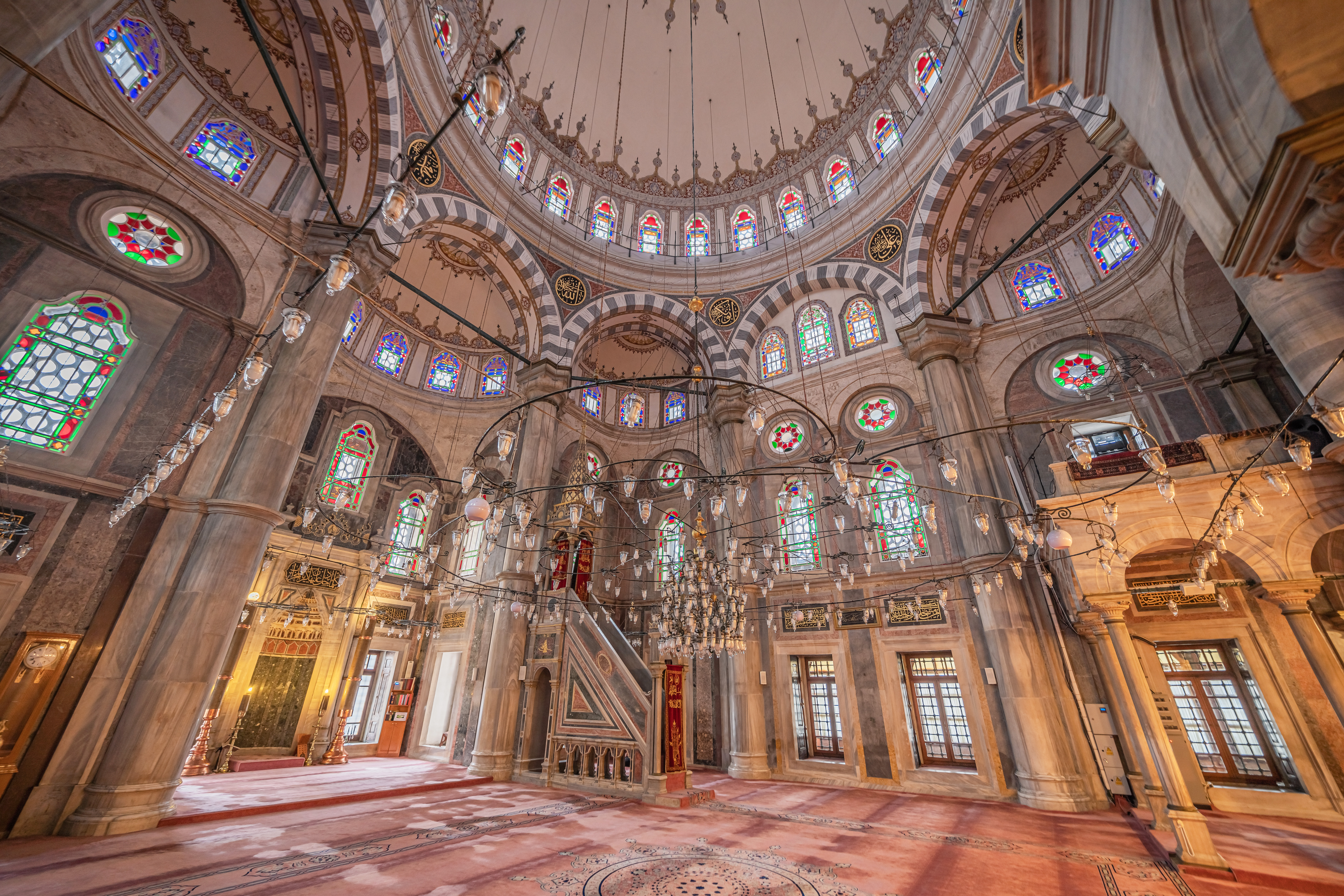
Interior of the Laleli Mosque in Istanbul (1760–1764)

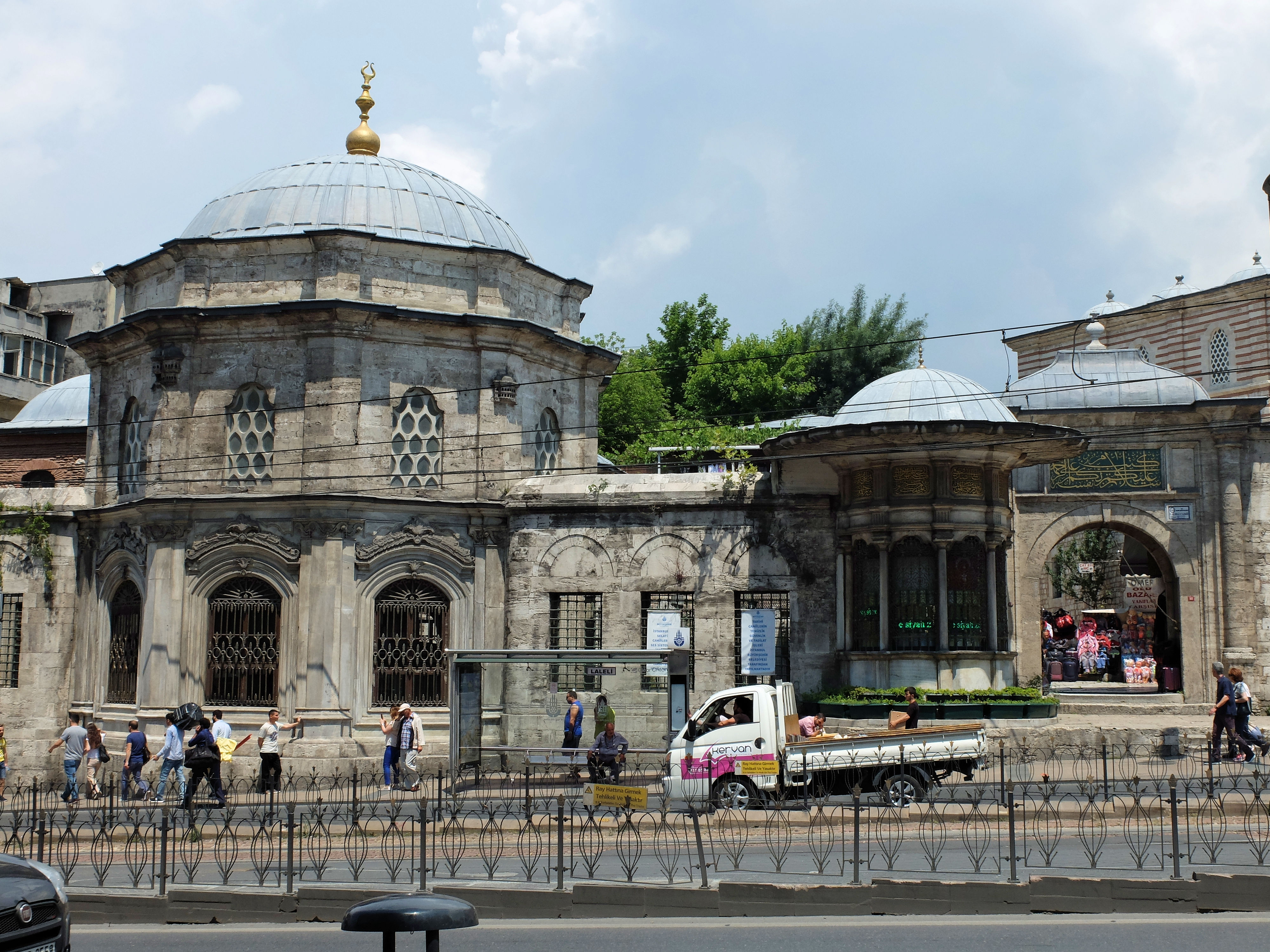
Tomb and Sebil of the Laleli Mosque complex

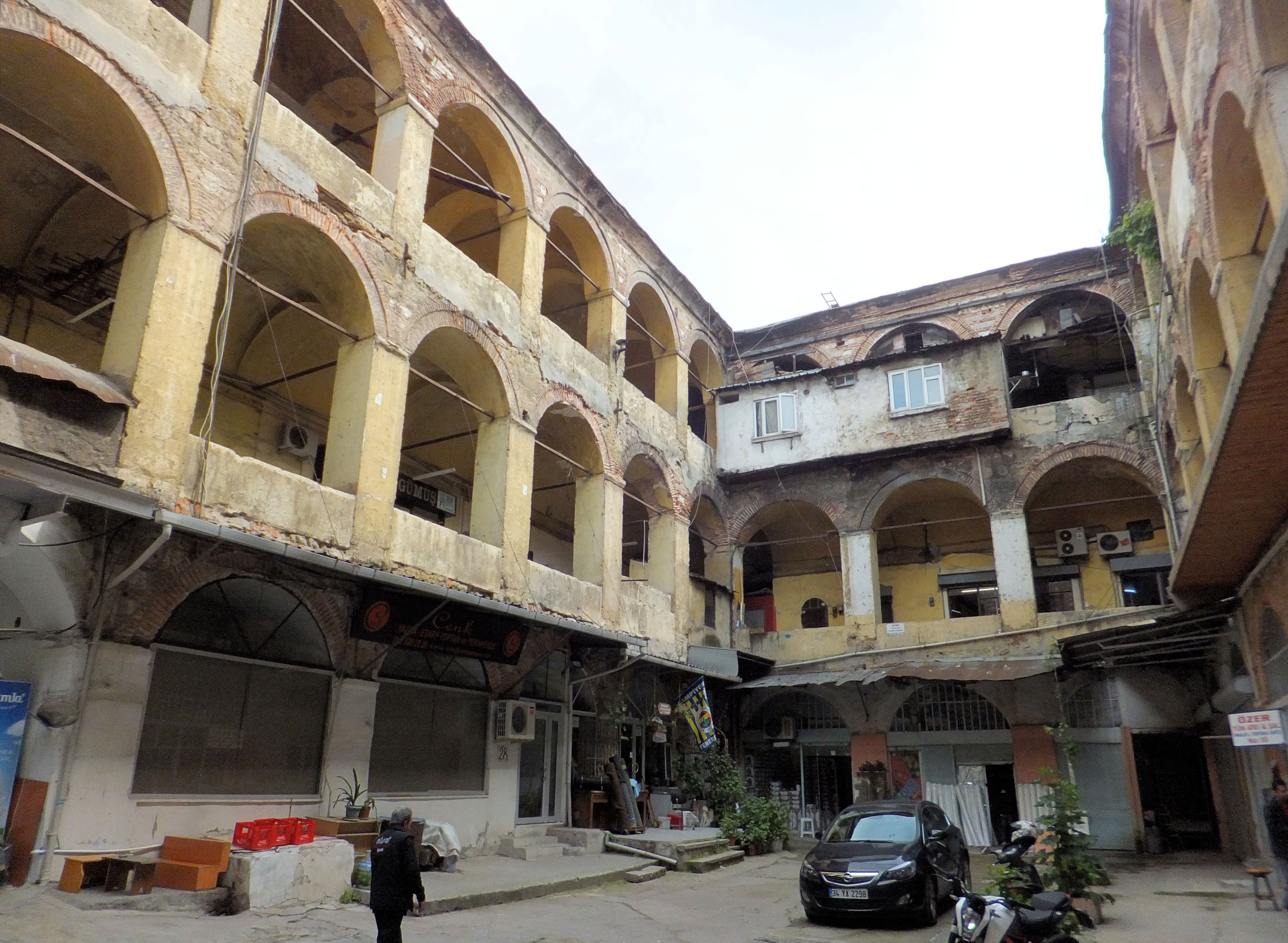
Büyük Yeni Han, Istanbul (1764)

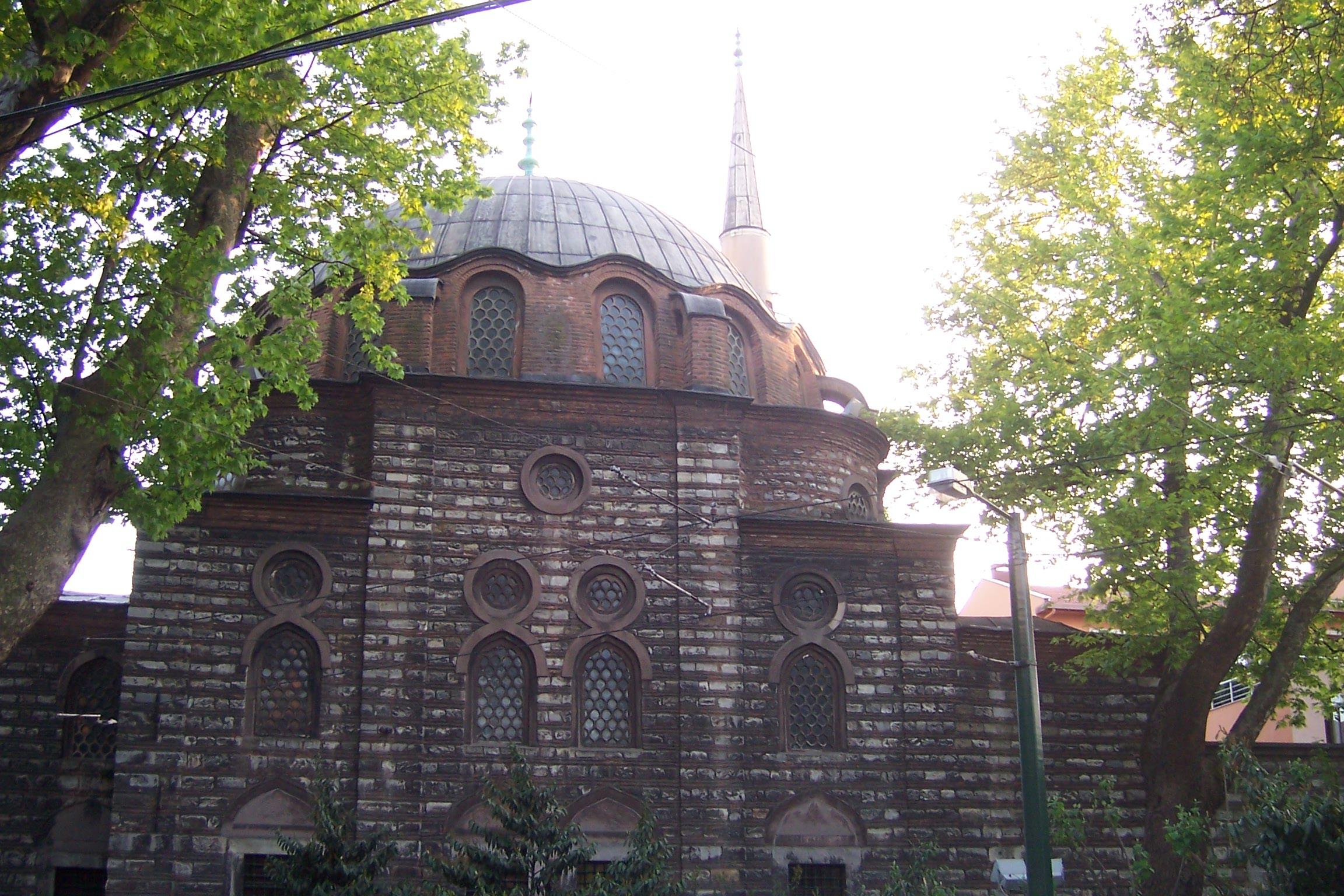
Zeynep Sultan Mosque, Istanbul (1769)

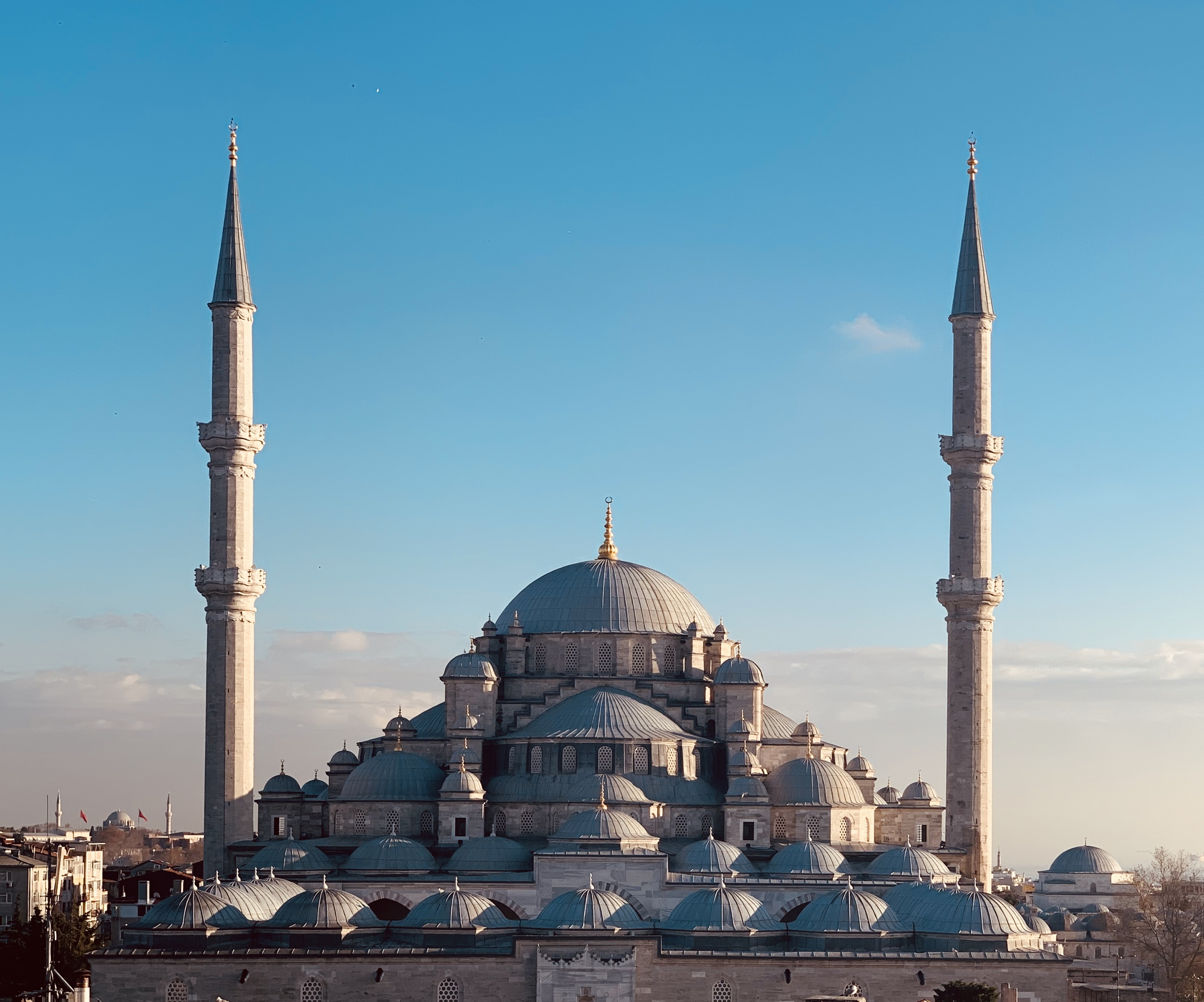
Fatih Mosque in Istanbul, rebuilt by Mustafa III (completed in 1771)

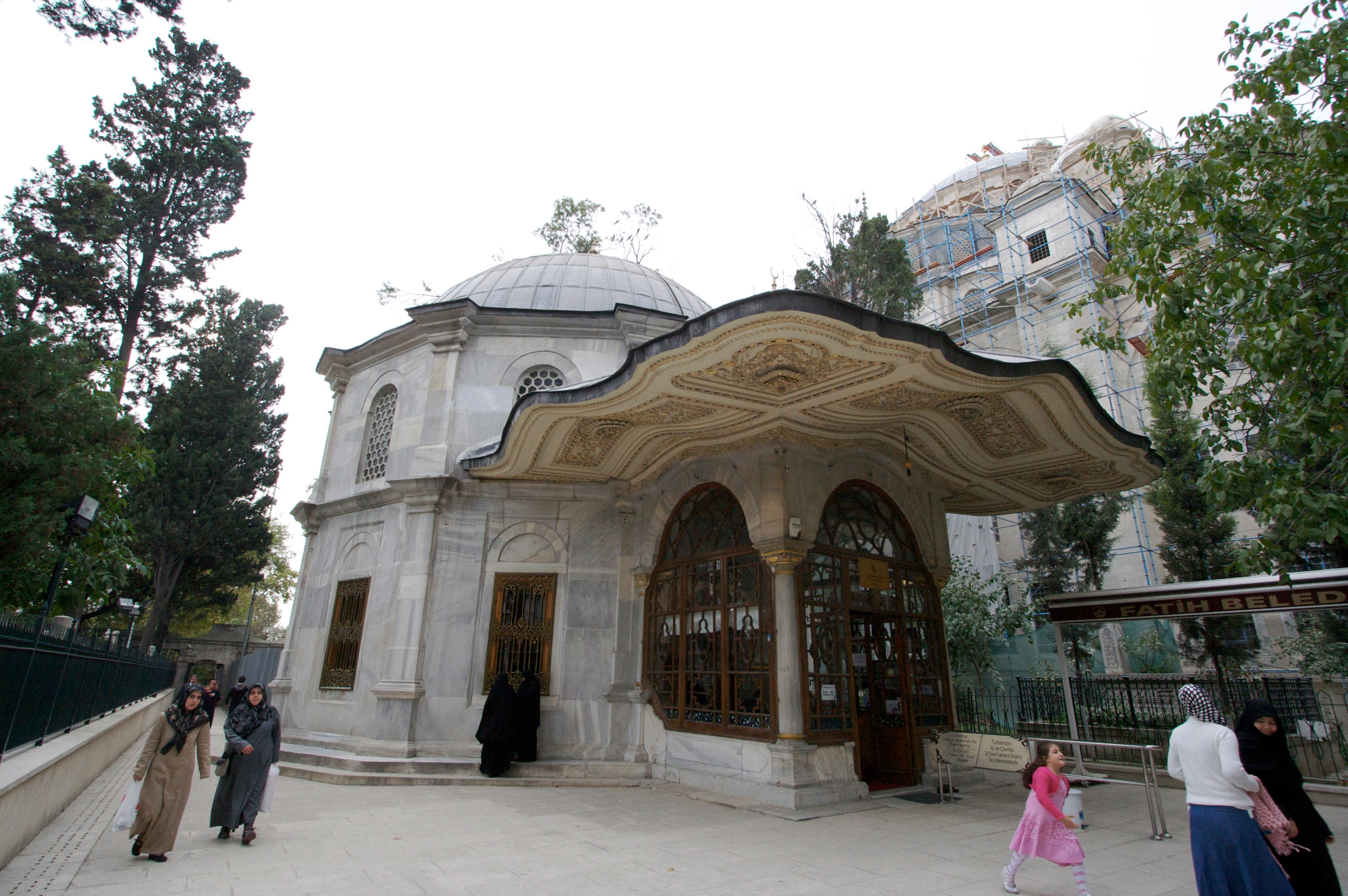
Tomb of Mehmed II behind the Fatih Mosque (reconstructed circa 1771)

=== Reign of Abdülhamid I ===
During the reign of Abdulhamid I (r. 1774–1789) more foreign architects and artists arrived in Istanbul and the Baroque style was further consolidated. Abdulhamid I built the Beylerbeyi Mosque (1777–1778) and Emirgan Mosque (1781–82), both located in suburbs of Istanbul on the shores of the Bosphorus, though both were modified by Mahmud II (r. 1808–1839). The Beylerbeyi Mosque is notable for being oriented towards the water: while some Istanbul mosques had been built along the waterside before, the Beylerbeyi Mosque is the first one which was clearly designed to present its main façade towards the shoreline. The mosque was intended to serve as the sultan's prayer space when he was residing in one of his palaces along the Bosphorus. The prayer hall is a traditional single-domed space, but the mosque's most innovative and influential feature is the wide two-story pavilion structure that occupies its front façade, replacing the traditional courtyard or entrance portico. This is an evolution of the imperial pavilions which were attached to the side or back of earlier mosques, taking on a more residential function as a royal apartment and forming an integrated part of the mosque's appearance. This new configuration was repeated in the design of later imperial mosques.

Abdülhamid built his tomb as part of a charitable complex, the Hamidiye Complex, constructed between 1775 and 1780 in the Eminönü neighbourhood. The chief court architect at the time was still Mehmed Tahir Agha (as it was under Mustafa III), but his role in the design of the Hamidiye Complex is not confirmed. The complex lacks a monumental congregational mosque and includes only a small mosque (mescit). Its main components were instead a madrasa and an imaret, along with the tomb itself and other minor structures. The design of the complex was notable for being completely integrated into the pre-existing urban fabric instead of being set apart in its own enclosure. The sultan's tomb is in Baroque style and one of its notable details is a large Qur'anic inscription band in thuluth script that curves around the interior.

Across the street from Abdülhamid's tomb was an ornate sebil, but this was relocated near the Zeynep Sultan Mosque after 1911 when the complex was partly demolished to widen the street. This sebil is considered one of the finest examples of Baroque sebils. Its surface shows a greater degree of three-dimensional sculpting, being profusely carved with scrolls, shells, foliage, and other Baroque moldings. The decoration also demonstrates a greater Rococo tendency, such as asymmetries in the details of the motifs. Another similar example from this period is the decorated façade and sebil of the Recai Mehmet Efendi School (1775), near the Şehzade Mosque. This trend towards even greater ornateness, including more three-dimensional renditions of motifs like acanthus leaves and oyster shells, along with the similarities to the Rococo style, came to characterize Ottoman Baroque architecture in the last quarter of the 18th century.

Architecture under Abdülhamid I

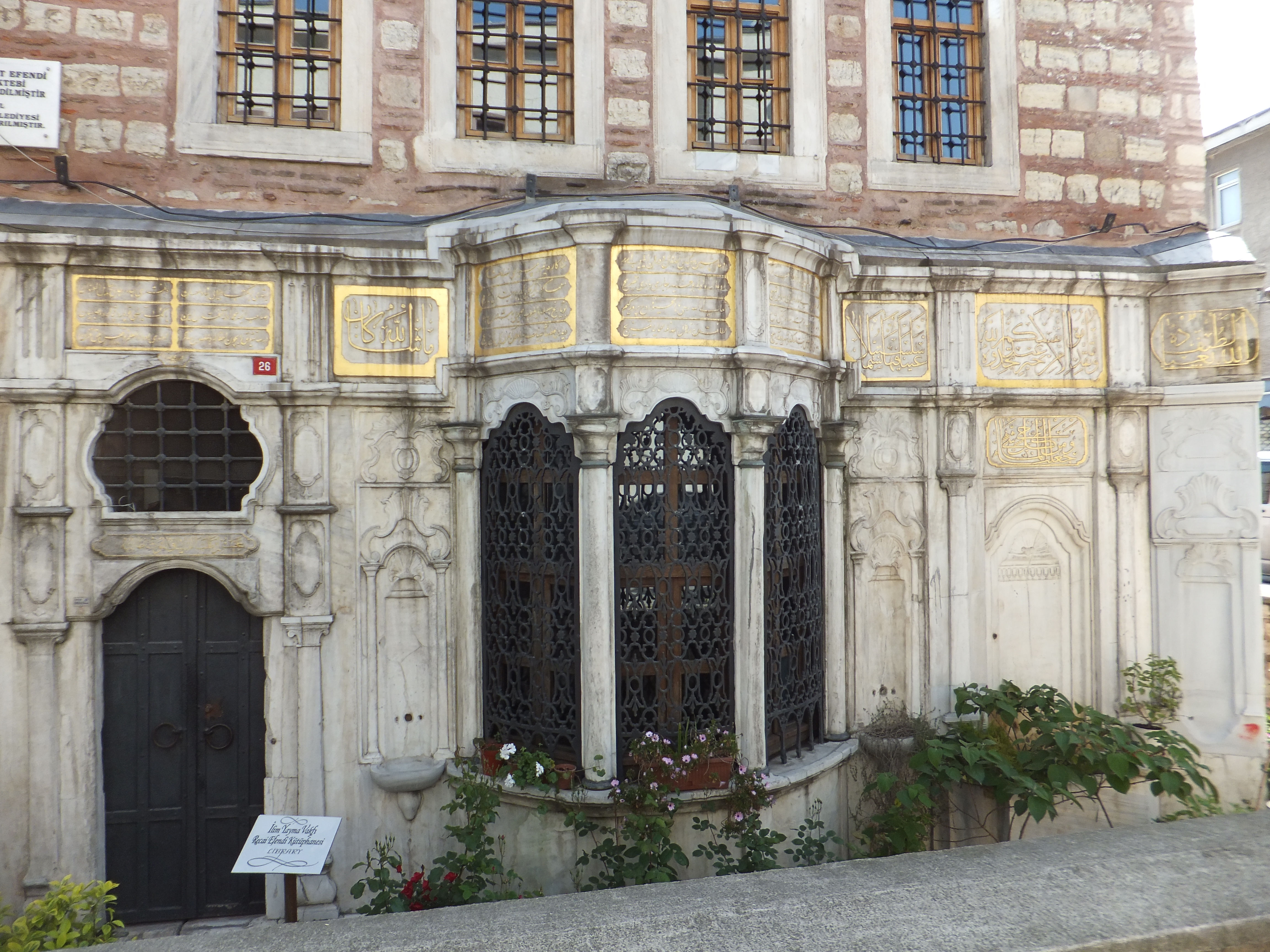
Recai Mehmet Efendi School and sebil, Istanbul (1775)

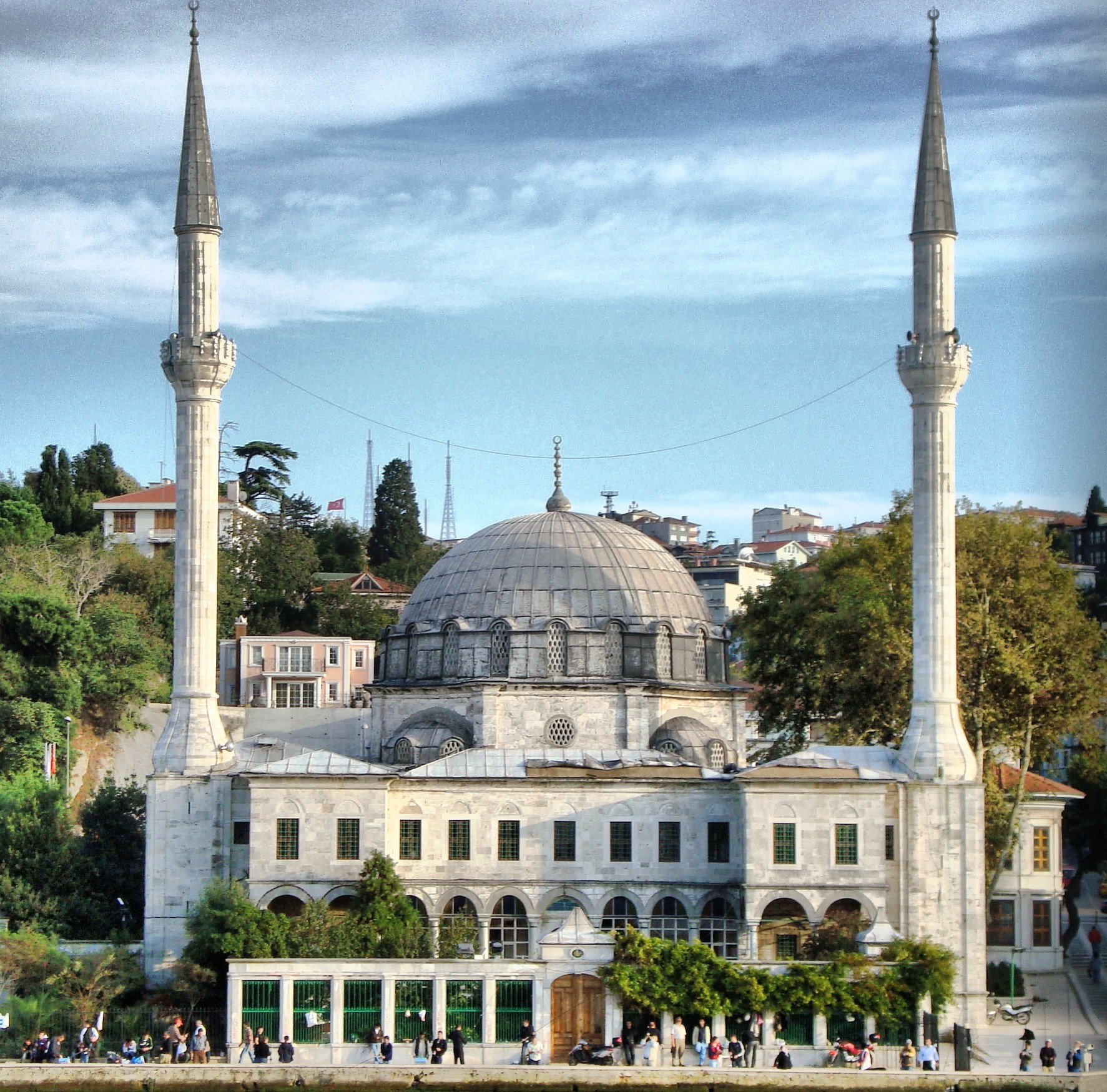
Beylerbeyi Mosque on the Bosphorus, near Istanbul (circa 1778, with later renovations)

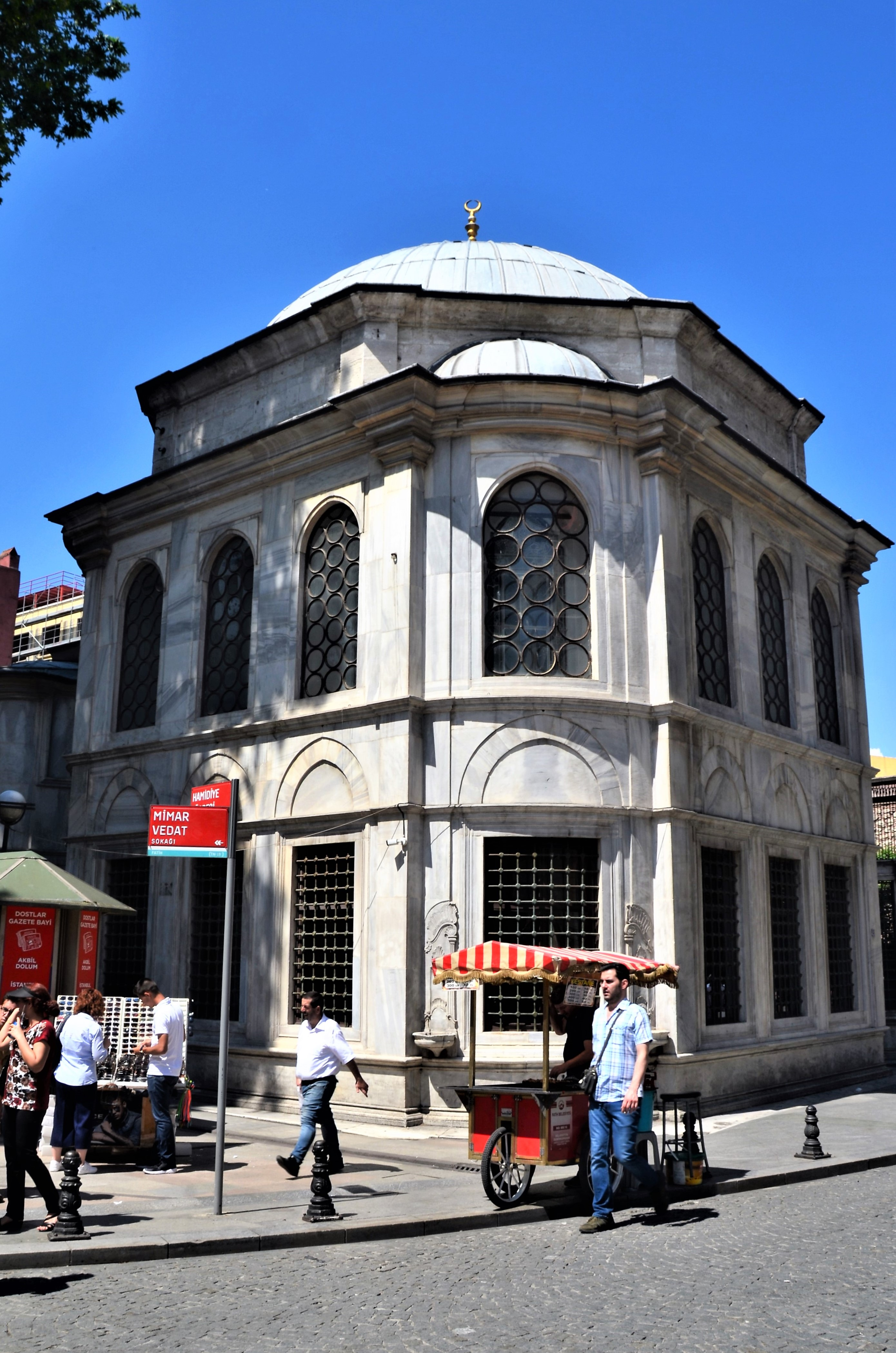
Tomb of Abdülhamid I in Istanbul (circa 1780)

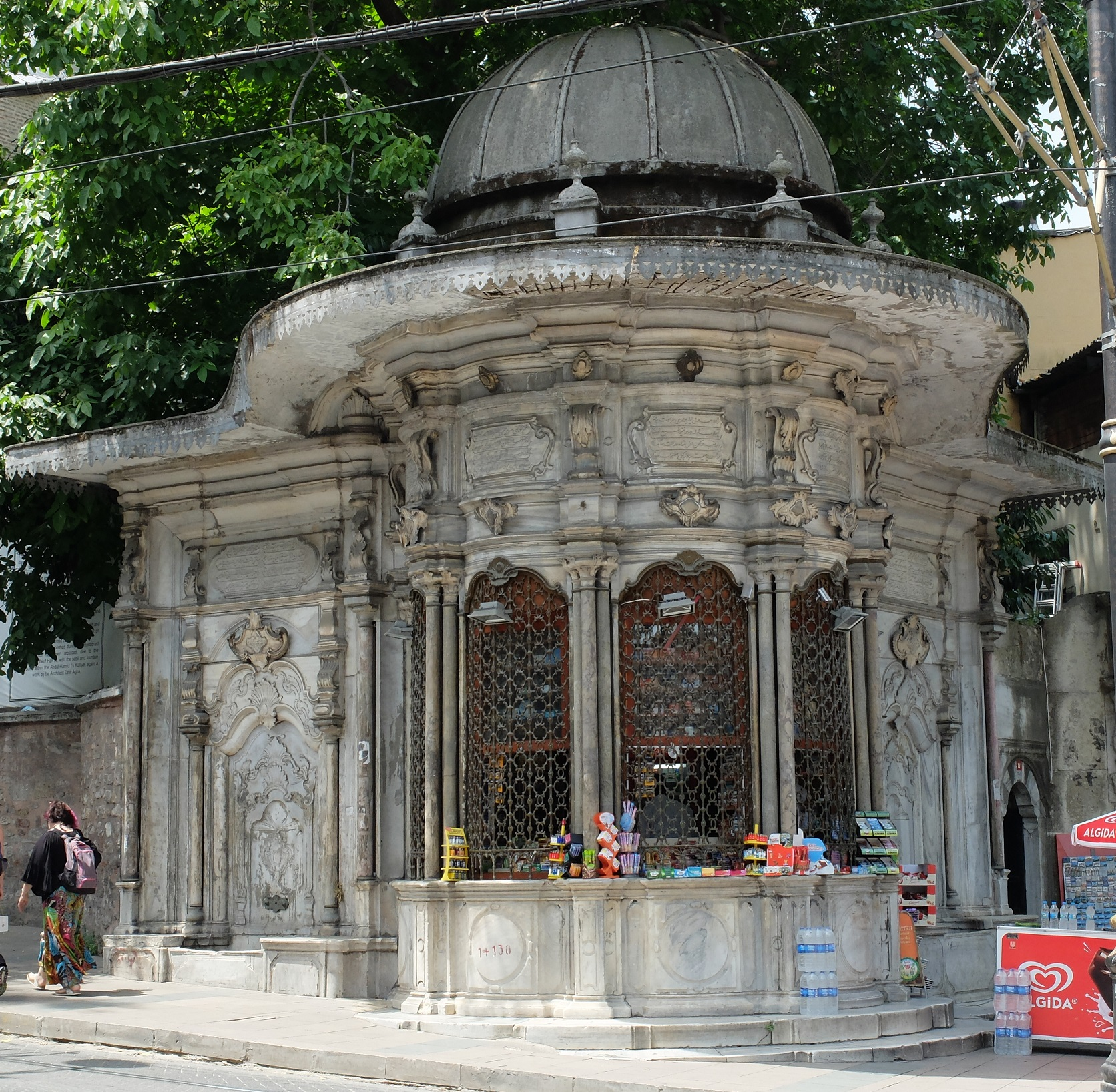
Sebil of Abdülhamid I, Istanbul (circa 1780)

=== Reign of Selim III ===
Selim III (r. 1789–1807) was responsible for rebuilding the Eyüp Sultan Mosque between 1798 and 1800. This mosque is located next to the tomb of Abu Ayyub al-Ansari, an important Islamic religious site in Istanbul originally built by Mehmed II. The new mosque made use of the classical Ottoman tradition by following the octagonal baldaquin design, similar to the Sokollu Mehmed Pasha Mosque in the Azapkapı neighbourhood, but much of its decoration is in the contemporary Baroque style. Only the minarets, dating from the reign of Ahmed III, remain from the previous mosque. In 1804 Selim III also rebuilt the Emir Sultan Mosque in Bursa after it was damaged by an earthquake (though the new mosque was in turn damaged during the 1855 earthquake). The previous Emir Sultan Mosque's foundations and some of its materials were reused in construction, resulting in a work that mixes archaic and Baroque elements.

Other important Baroque monuments were also built in the Eyüp neighbourhood around this time by Selim III's family. Before the reconstruction of the mosque, Mihrişah Sultan (Selim III's mother) built a charitable complex nearby in a Baroque style. Its construction took place between 1792 and 1796. It consists of a large imaret (still functioning today) and a mektep (primary school), but from the street its most visible elements are the tomb and sebil. This urban configuration is similar to the earlier Hamidiye Complex. The façade of the complex, with its vibrantly Baroque sebil and tomb, is one of the most notable exterior façade designs in Ottoman Baroque architecture. Doğan Kuban compares its ornamentation to the French Rocaille style in particular. He notes that similar ornamentation in the apartments of Abdülhamid I and Selim III in the Topkapı Palace (added around the same period) may have been executed by the same craftsmen. Further south from Mihrişah Sultan's complex, near the 16th-century Zal Mahmud Pasha Mosque, the Tomb of Şah Sultan (Selim III's sister) is another important example of a Baroque tomb from this era, built in 1800–1801. One notable detail is its use of elliptical windows above its ground-floor windows.

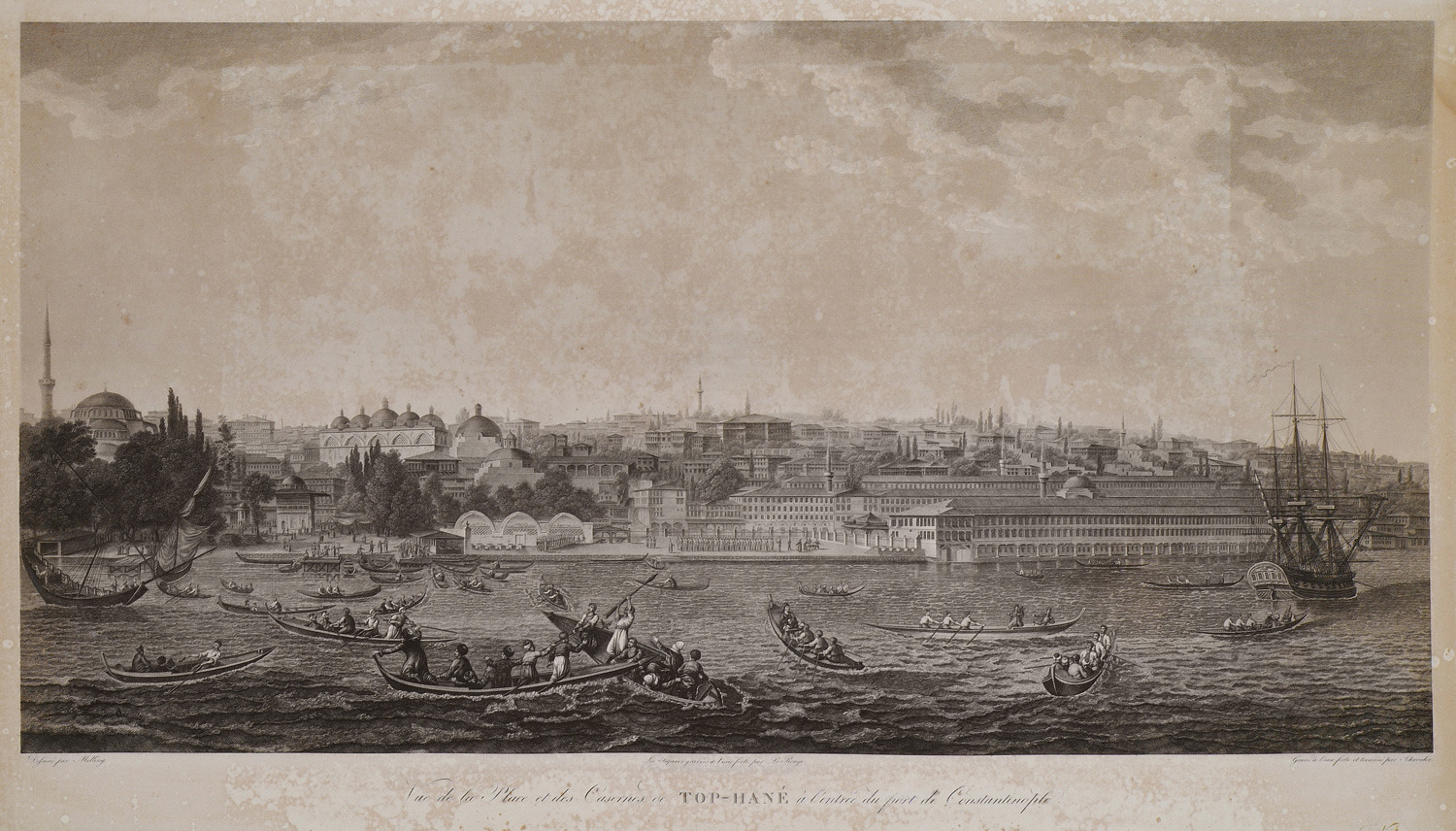
Tophane Barracks of Selim III (right), seen in a 1819 engraving by Melling

Selim III established a new Western-inspired building type in Ottoman architecture: the barracks. The first example of this new tradition, the Kalyoncu Barracks in Kasımpaşa, was built to house sailors and included an accompanying mosque. It was commissioned by admiral Cezayirli Hasan Pasha in 1783–1784, under Abdülhamid I. However, it was under Selim III that monumental barracks proliferated and became highly visible elements of the urban landscape. Most of these early barracks were wooden buildings that were later rebuilt in the 19th century. This new building type arose in conjunction with Selim III's reform attempts, the Nizam-I Cedid ("New Order"), which among other things created a new Western-style army. Selim III built a barracks building for his "New Artillery" regiment in Tophane, near the later site of the Nusretiye Mosque. This was destroyed by fire in 1823 and rebuilt by Mahmud II in 1824. Another barracks for artillerymen was built by Mihrişah Sultan in 1792 or 1793–1794 in Hasköy. It featured a mosque, the Humbarahane Mosque, at the center of it. The building has only partially survived to the present day. The largest barracks of the time, the Selimiye Barracks, was built in southern Üsküdar between 1800 and 1803, but was burned down by revolting Janissaries in 1812. It was rebuilt in stone by Mahmud II between 1825 and 1828 and further expanded to its current form by Abdulmecid between 1842 and 1853.

The construction of the Selimiye Barracks was soon accompanied by the construction of the nearby Selimiye Mosque complex between 1801 and 1805. Three men served as chief court architects during this period but the main architect may have been Foti Kalfa, a Christian master carpenter. The complex included a mosque and its usual dependencies like a mektep and a hammam. More innovatively, it also included an array of factories, shops, and modern facilities such as a printing house, all arranged to form the nucleus of a new neighbourhood with a regular grid of streets. The mosque is built in high-quality stone and in a fully Baroque style. Its design illustrates the degree of influence exerted by the earlier Beylerbeyi Mosque, as it incorporates a wide imperial pavilion that stretches across its front façade. However, the design of the imperial pavilion was further refined: the two wings of the pavilion are raised on a marble arcade and there is space in the middle, between the two wings, where a staircase and entrance portico leads into the mosque, allowing for a more monumental entrance to be retained. The prayer hall is once again a single-domed space but the side galleries that are usually present inside earlier mosques have in this case been moved completely outside the prayer hall, along the building's exterior. The building is also notable for high-quality stone decoration, with the exterior marked by stone moldings along its many edges and sculpted keystones for its arches.

Architecture under Selim III

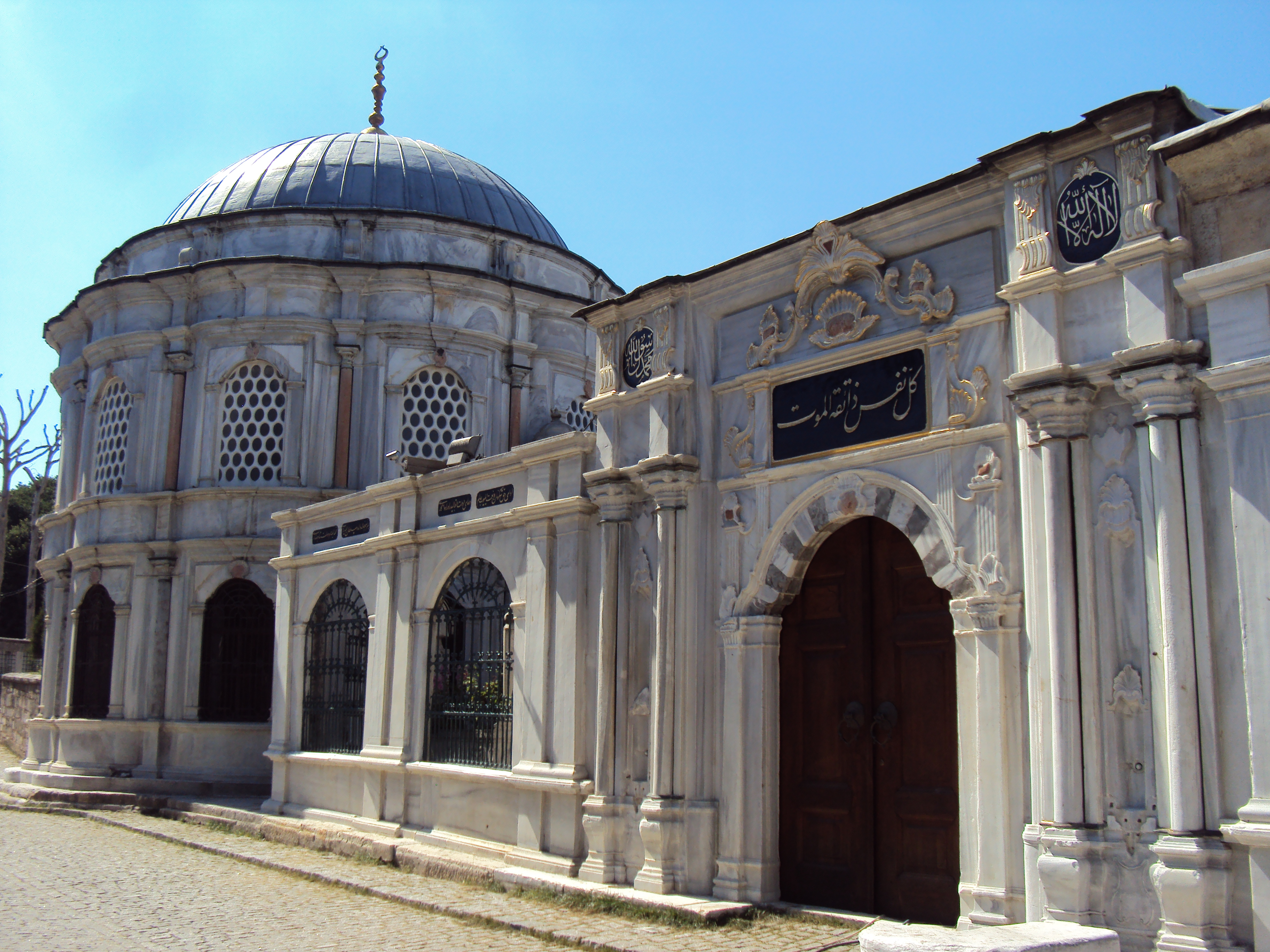
Mihrişah Sultan Complex in Eyüp, Istanbul (1792–1796)

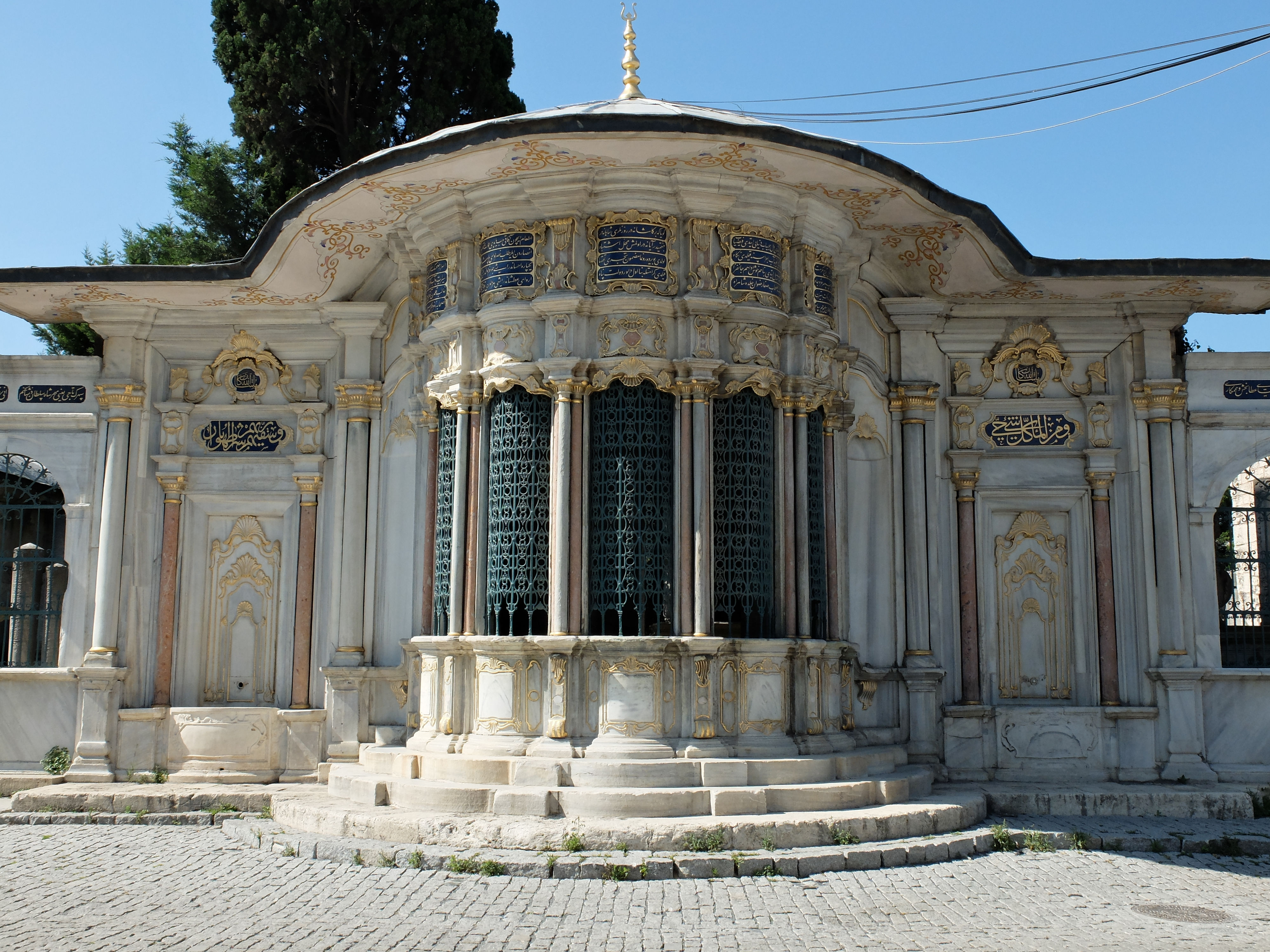
Sebil of the Mihrişah Sultan Complex, with side fountains

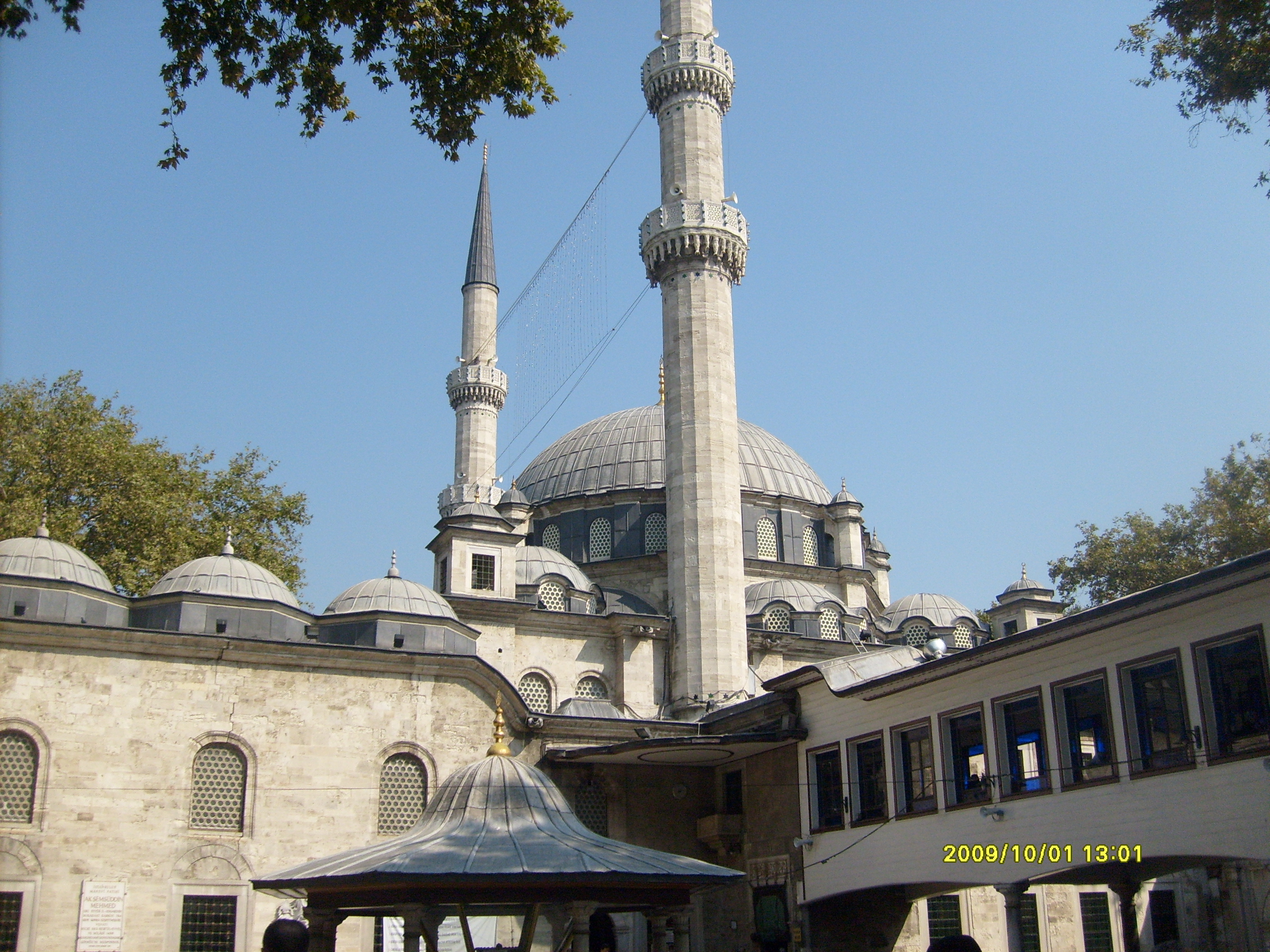
Eyüp Sultan Mosque in Istanbul, rebuilt by Selim III (1798–1800)

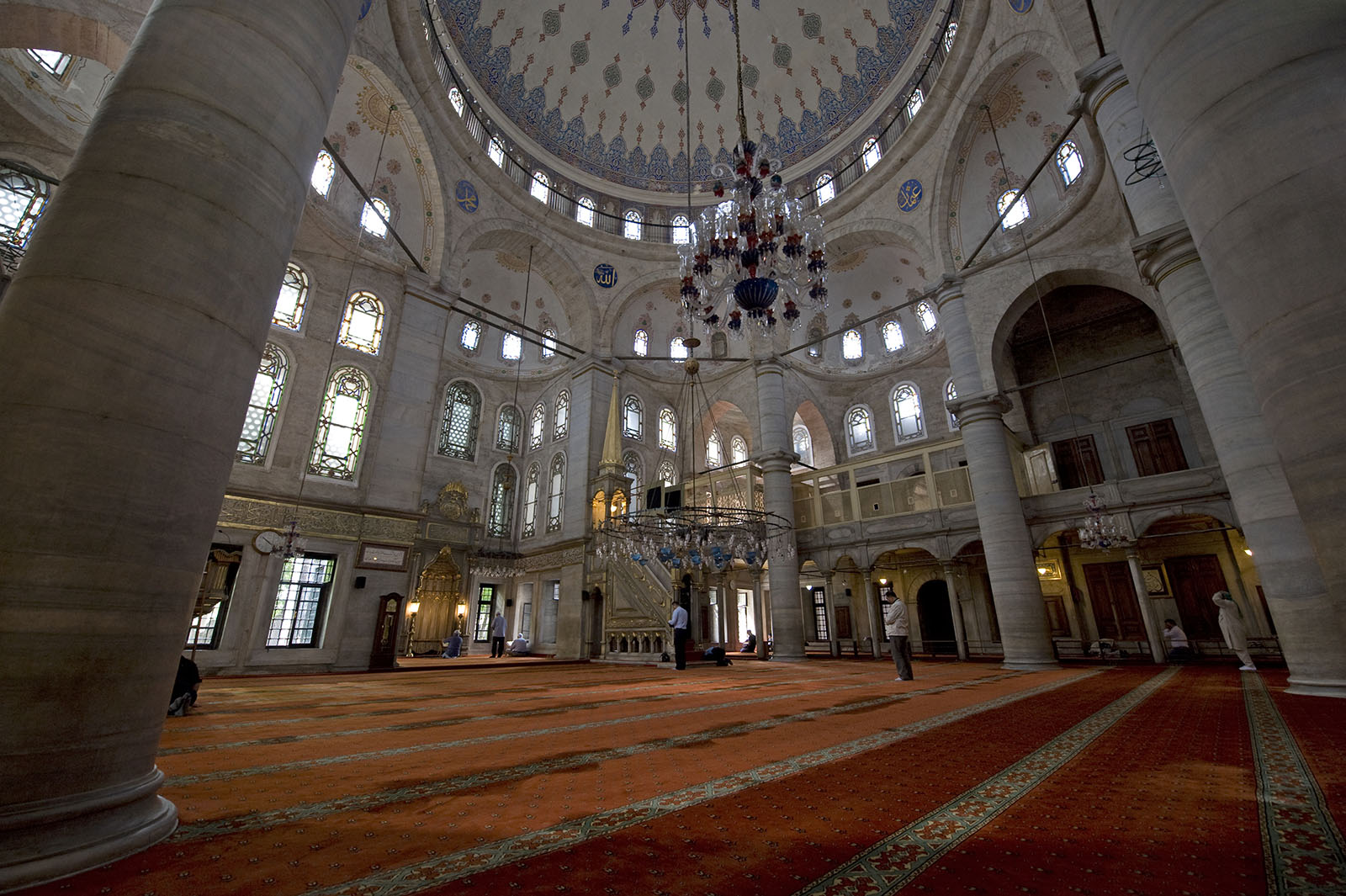
Eyüp Sultan Mosque interior

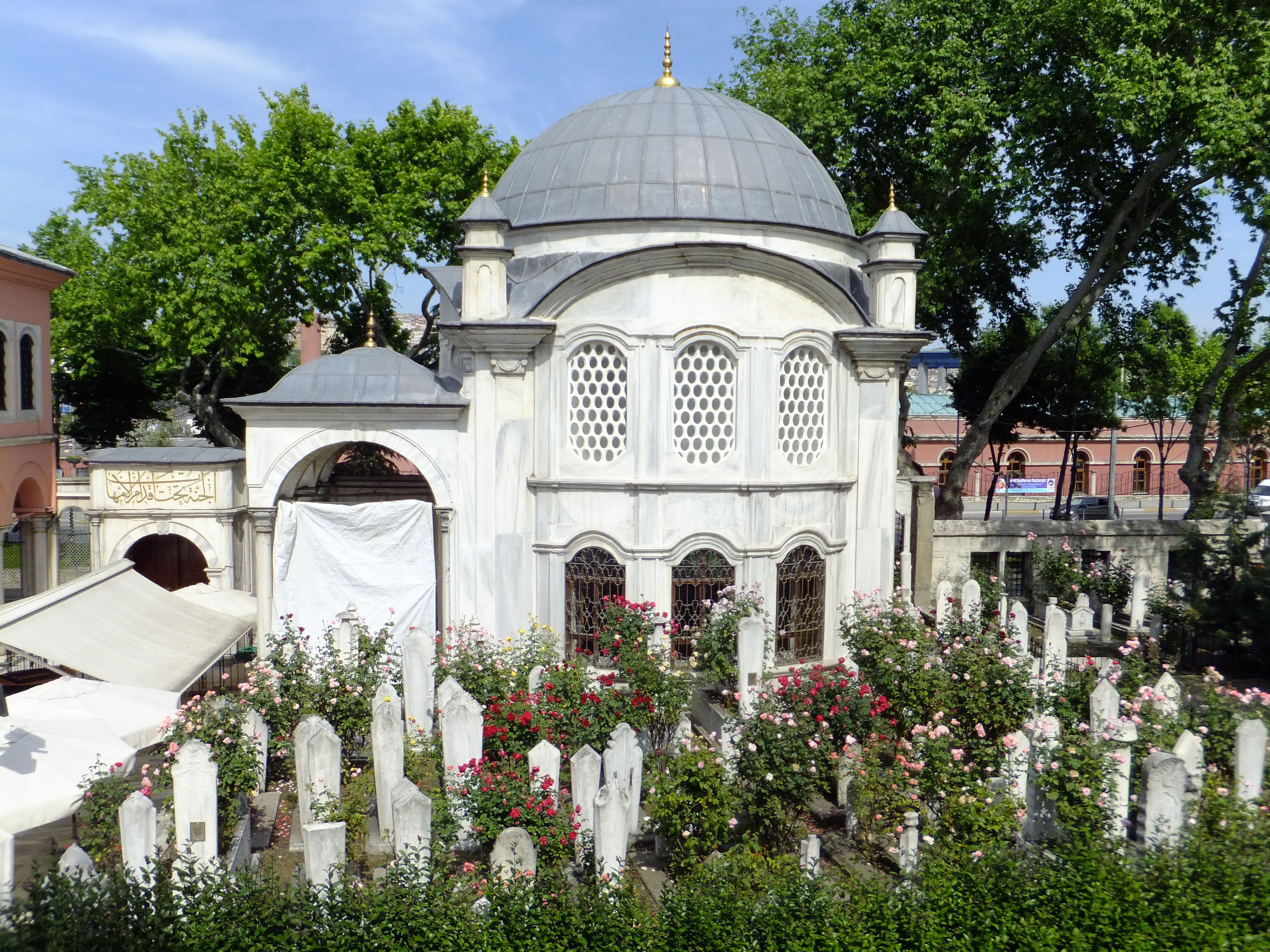
Tomb of Şah Sultan in Eyüp, Istanbul (1800–1801)

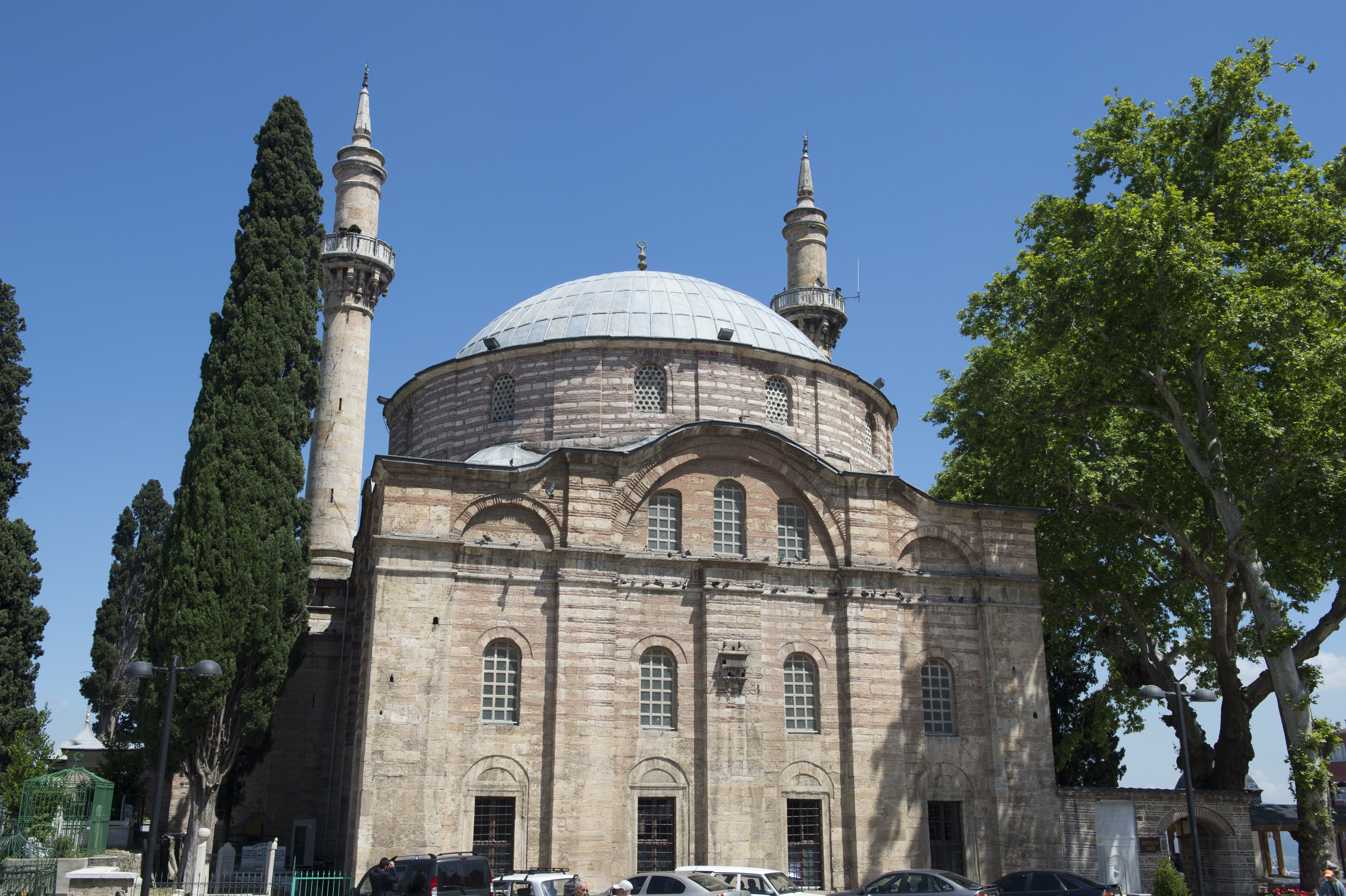
Emir Sultan Mosque in Bursa, rebuilt by Selim III (1804)

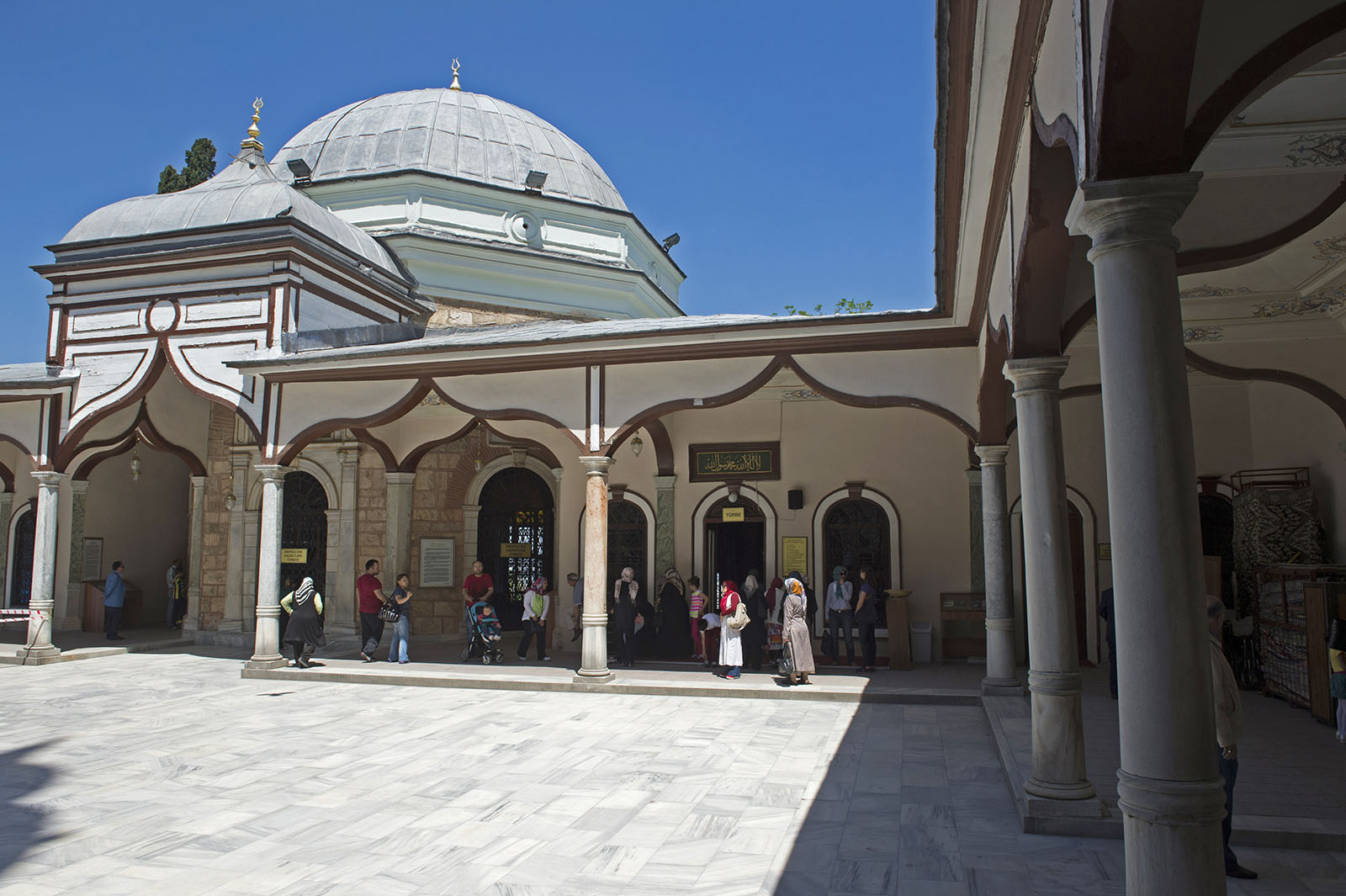
Tomb and courtyard of the Emir Sultan complex in Bursa

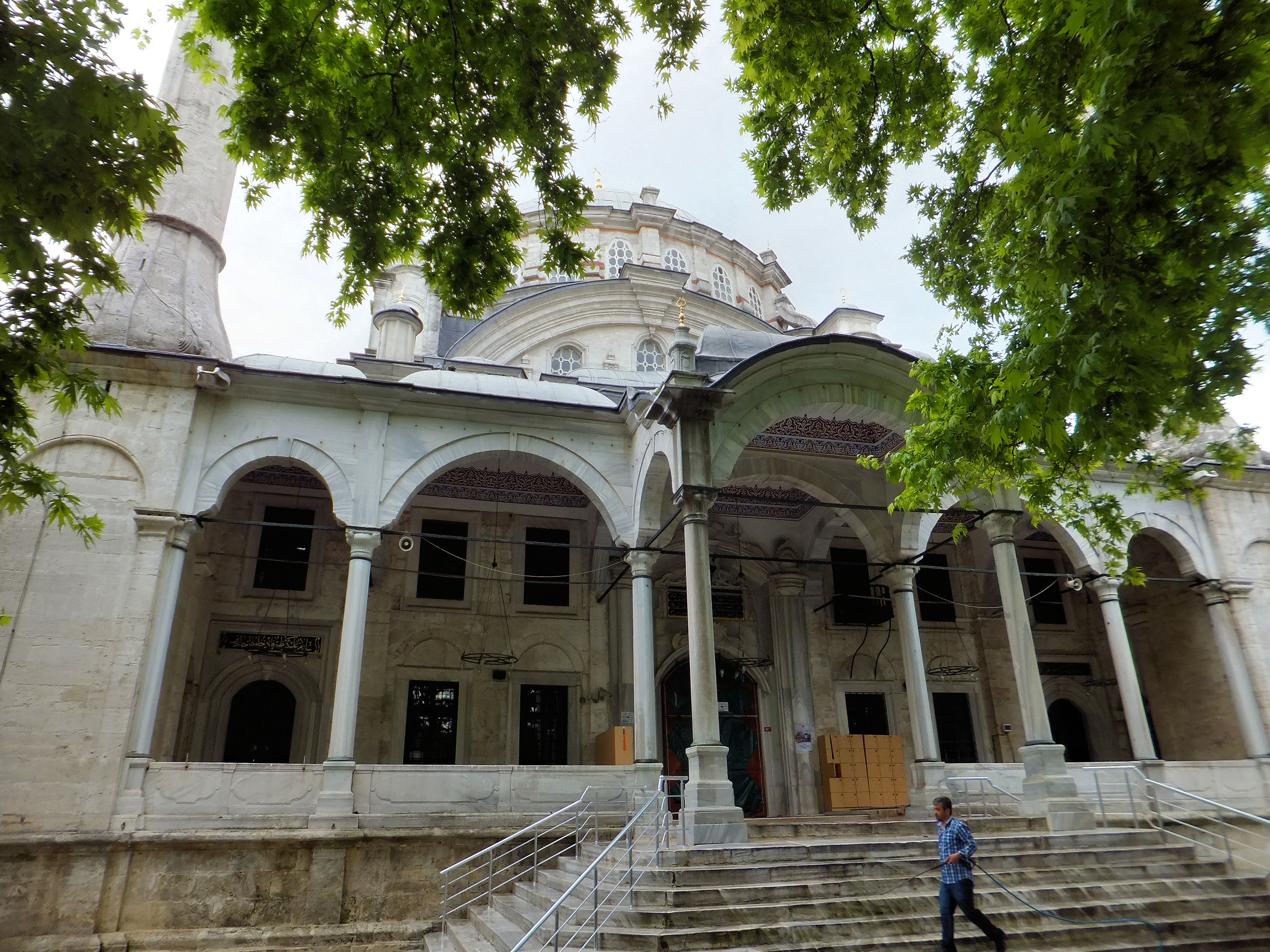
Selimiye Mosque in Üsküdar, Istanbul (1801–1805): view of the front façade and entrance portico

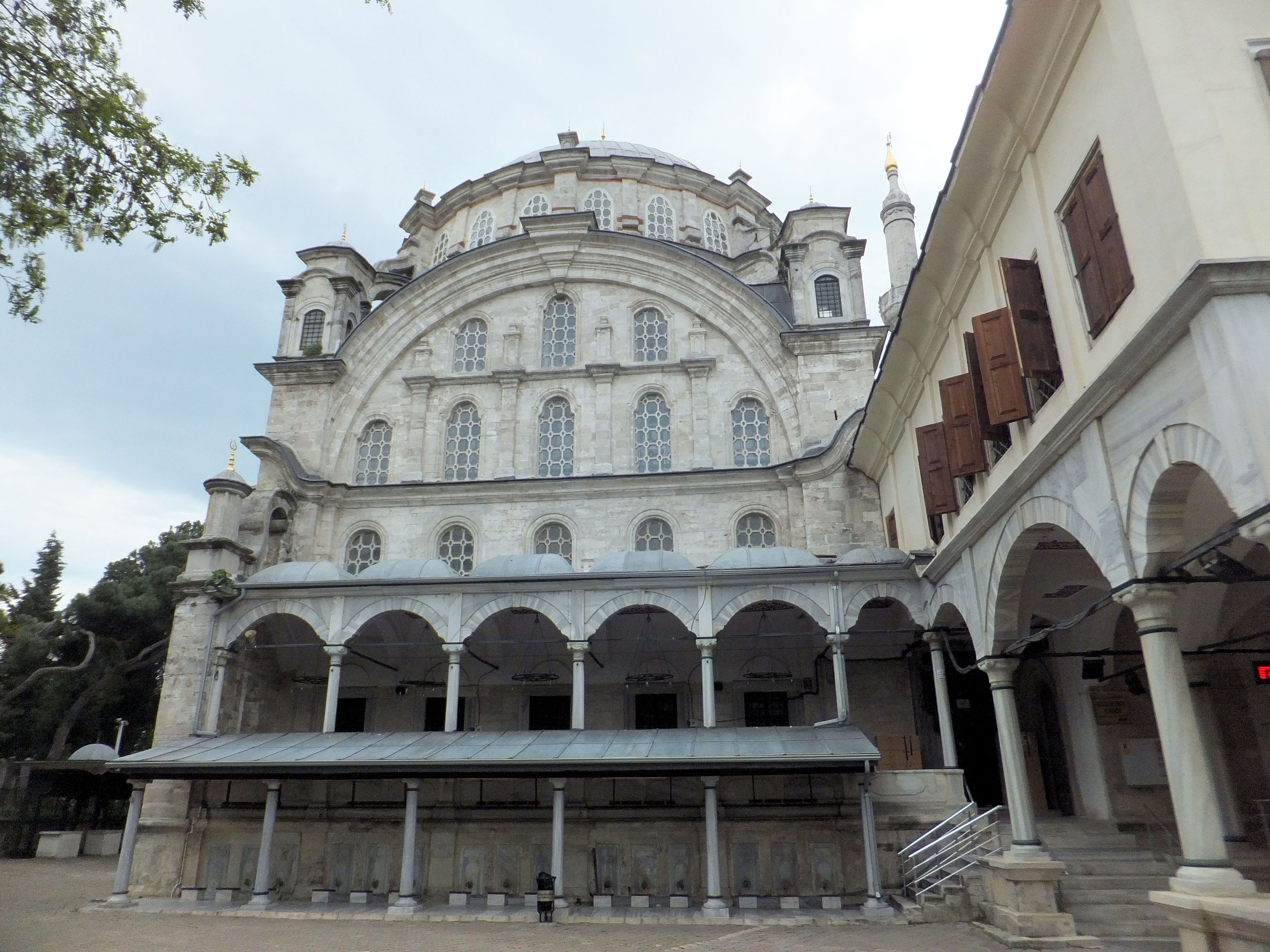
Selimiye Mosque: side view with external gallery and part of the imperial pavilion (right)

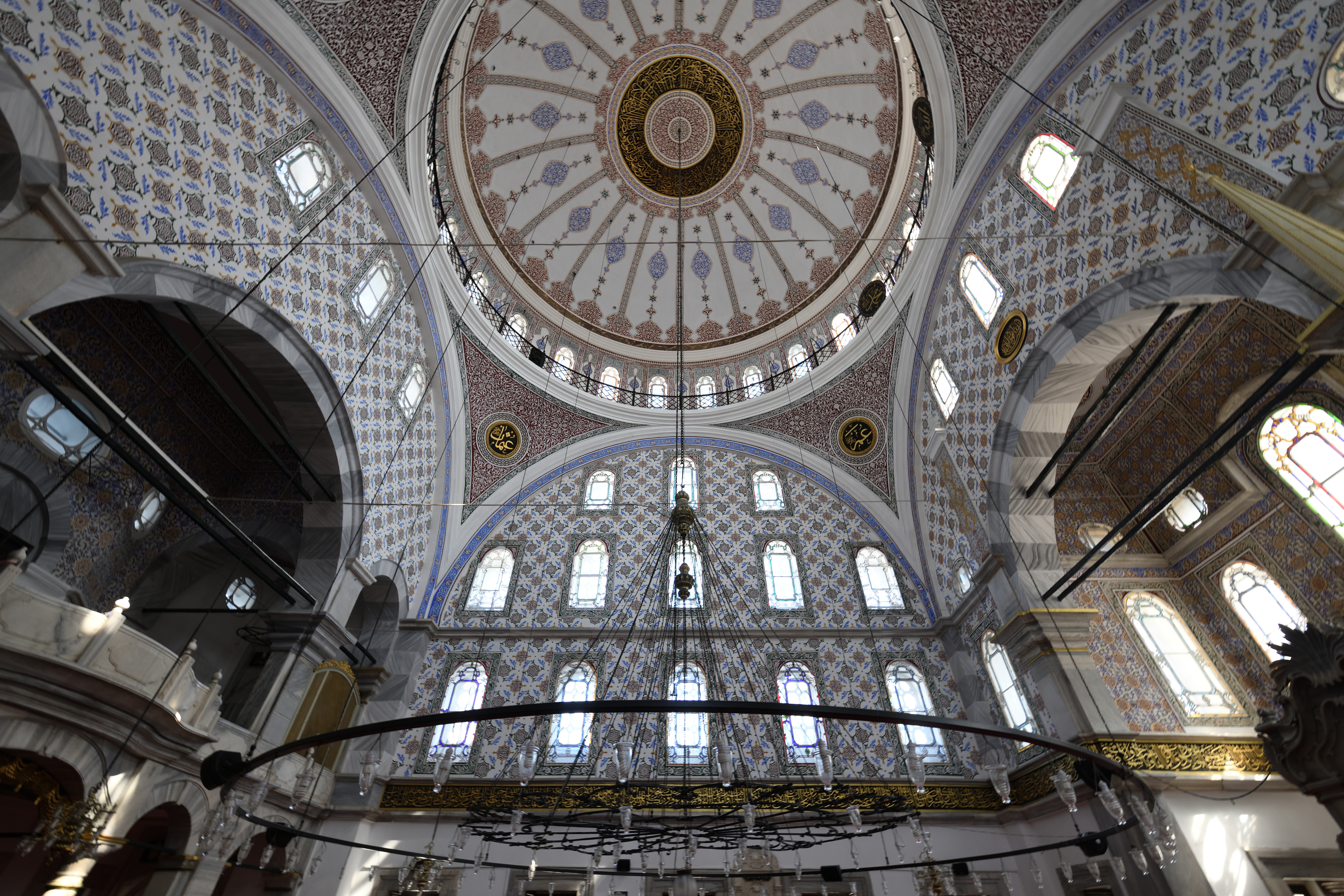
Interior of Selimiye Mosque

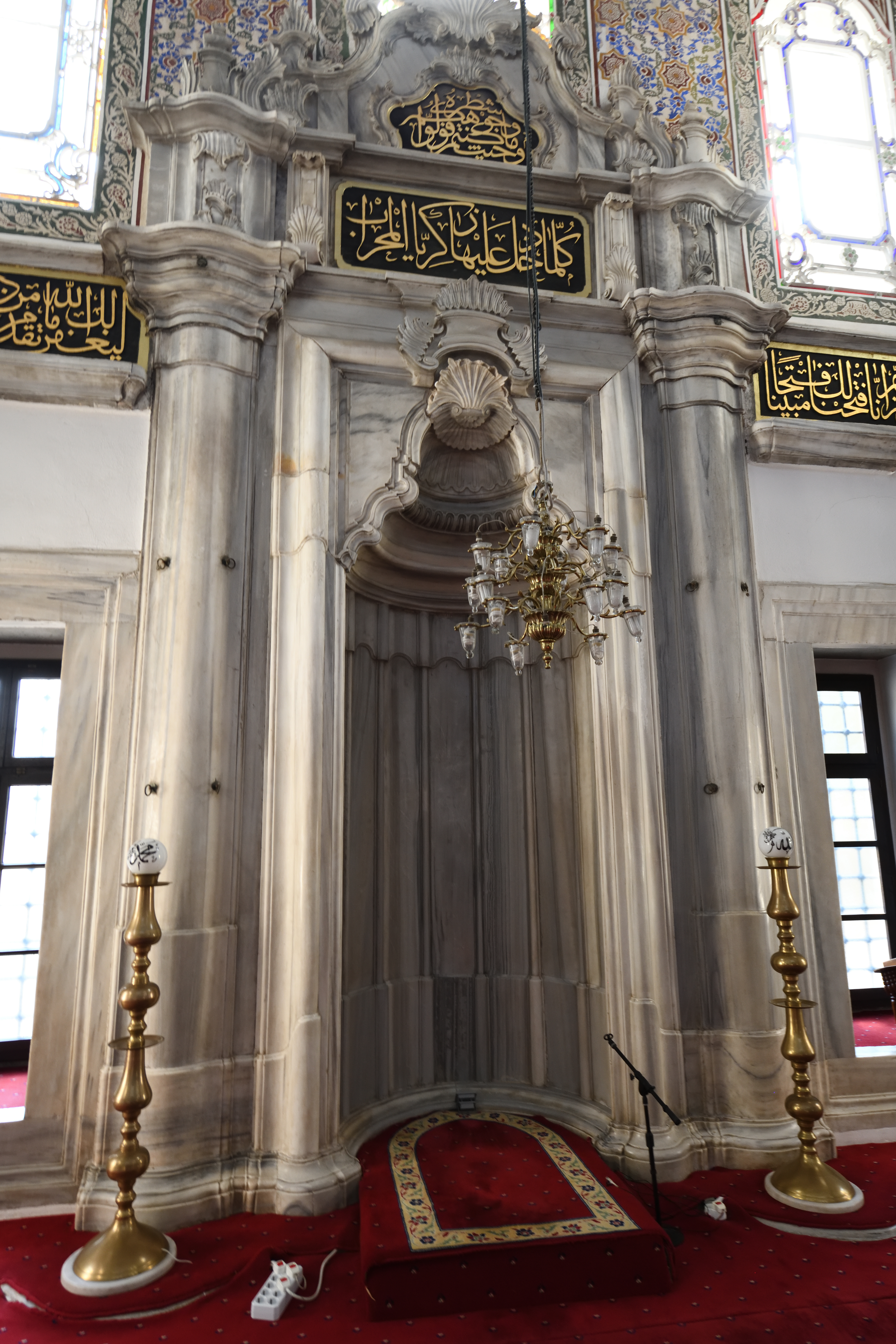
Mihrab of the Selimiye Mosque

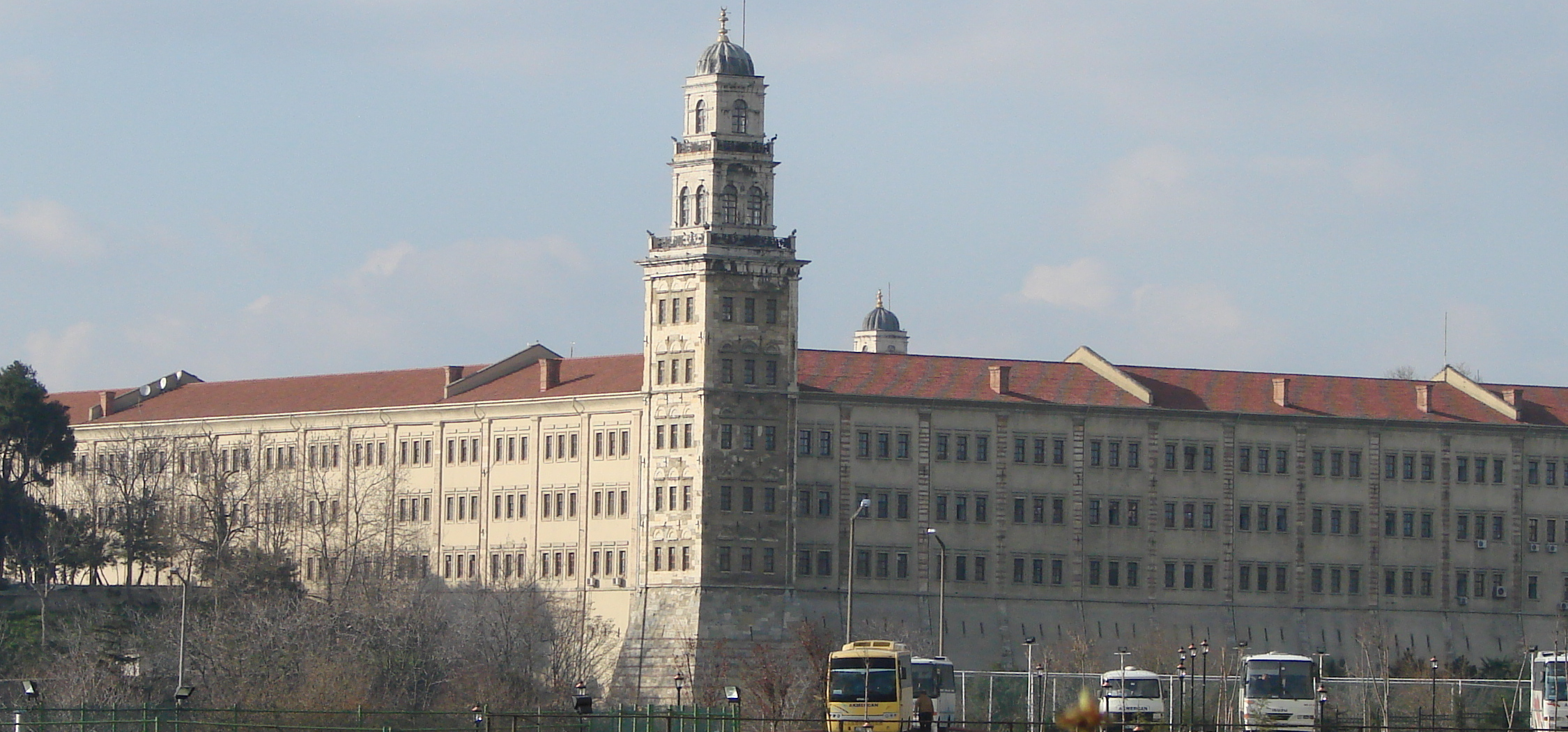
Selimiye Barracks in Üsküdar, originally built by Selim III (circa 1803) but rebuilt by Mahmud II

=== Palace architecture in the Baroque period ===
==== Topkapı Palace ====
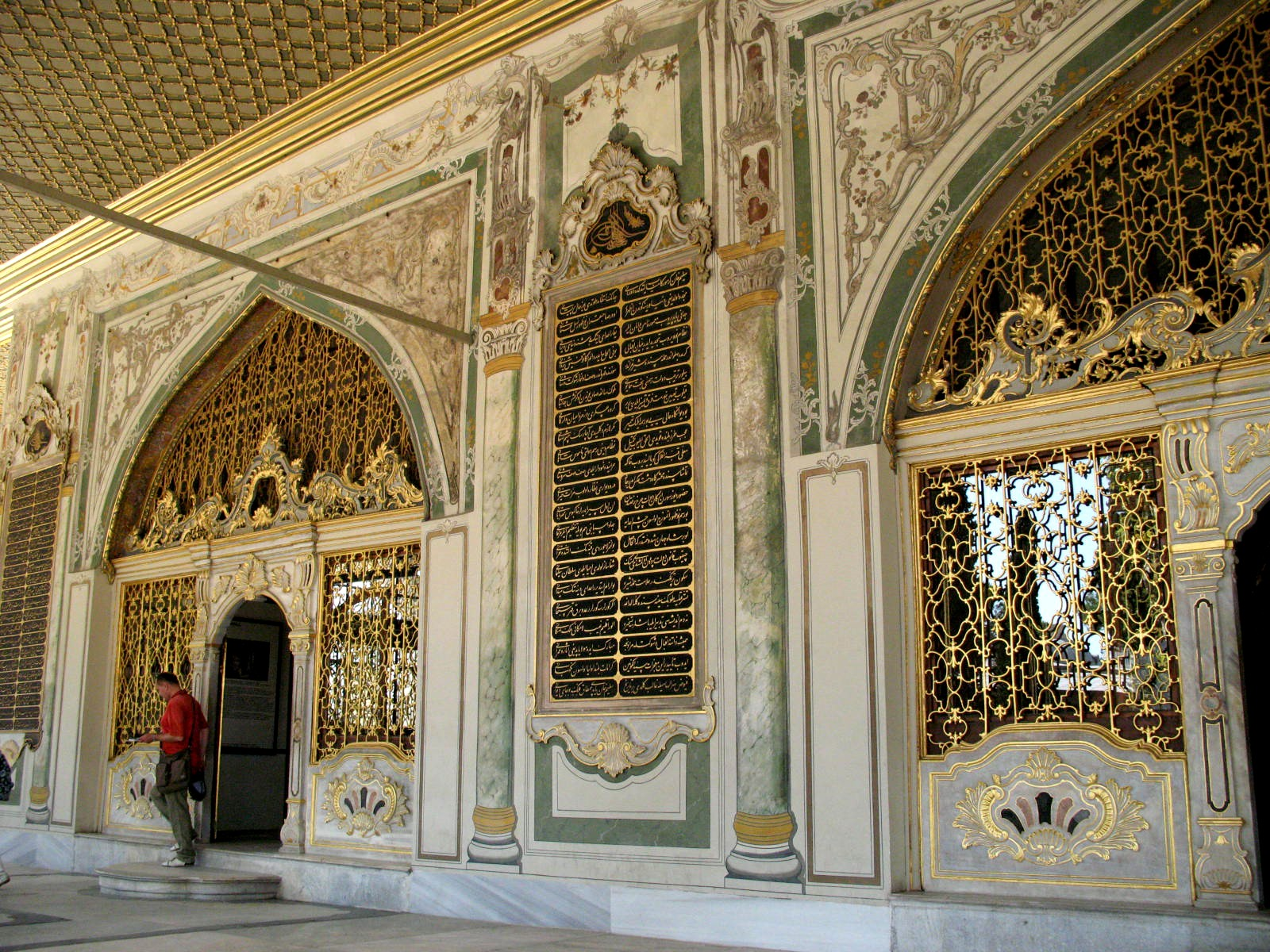
Baroque decoration on the exterior of the Imperial Council (Divan) Hall in Topkapı Palace

In Topkapı Palace, the Ottoman sultans and their family continued to build new rooms or remodel old ones throughout the 18th century, introducing Baroque and Rococo decoration in the process. In 1752, Mahmud I restored the Sofa Kiosk (Sofa Köşkü) in Rococo style. This kiosk is a garden pavilion in the Fourth Court that was first begun in the late 17th century by Mustafa Pasha and then either completed or restored by Ahmed III in 1704. The Imperial Council (Divan) Hall in the Second Court of the palace was redecorated in flamboyant Baroque style by Selim III in 1792 and by Mahmud II in 1819.

Inside the Harem section, Abdulhamid I renovated the Imperial Hall (Hünkâr Sofası), adding among other things a Baroque wall fountain and Dutch blue-and-white tiles (although the decoration of the dome has since been restored to its late 16th-century state). The main baths of the Harem, which served the sultan and the valide sultan (queen mother), were probably renovated by Mahmud I around 1744, providing them with their current Baroque decoration. The School of Princes was redecorated with some Baroque elements in 18th century, the most elaborate additions being the fireplaces in the School's classroom and in its private apartments. Osman III renovated the prayer room of the women's section in the Harem, providing it with a stone-carved Baroque mihrab.

The Kiosk of Osman III, completed in 1754-55, is one of the most notable additions of this era. It was built over a masonry substructure that extends behind the Imperial Hall, with a marble terrace filling the space between them. The terrace includes flowerbeds and a central water basin, while a private passage on the west side grants access between the kiosk and the palace. The terrace façade of the kiosk includes a wide undulating eave. The kiosk itself is made of wood and consists of several rooms, with the main room in the middle projecting out over the edge of the palace walls to provide wider views. Its interior is heavily decorated with Baroque and Rococo decoration, including gilded carvings and trompe-l'oeil paintings of architectural scenes.

In the area near Osman III's kiosk, Abdulhamid I and Selim III later added their own lavishly decorated Rococo apartments. The decoration here includes Baroque-style gilt reliefs and marble fountains and fireplaces. Unlike some of the earlier domed apartments of the classical Ottoman period, they have flat wooden ceilings. A nearby upstairs apartment was also commissioned by Selim III in 1790 for his mother Mihrişah Sultan. Designed by Antoine Ignace Melling, it is one of the finest examples of this style in the palace. It consists of two rooms with flat ceilings decorated with Baroque-style gold leaf, a marble Baroque fireplace with European tiles, and Western-style landscape paintings decorating the walls.

Baroque architecture in Topkapı Palace

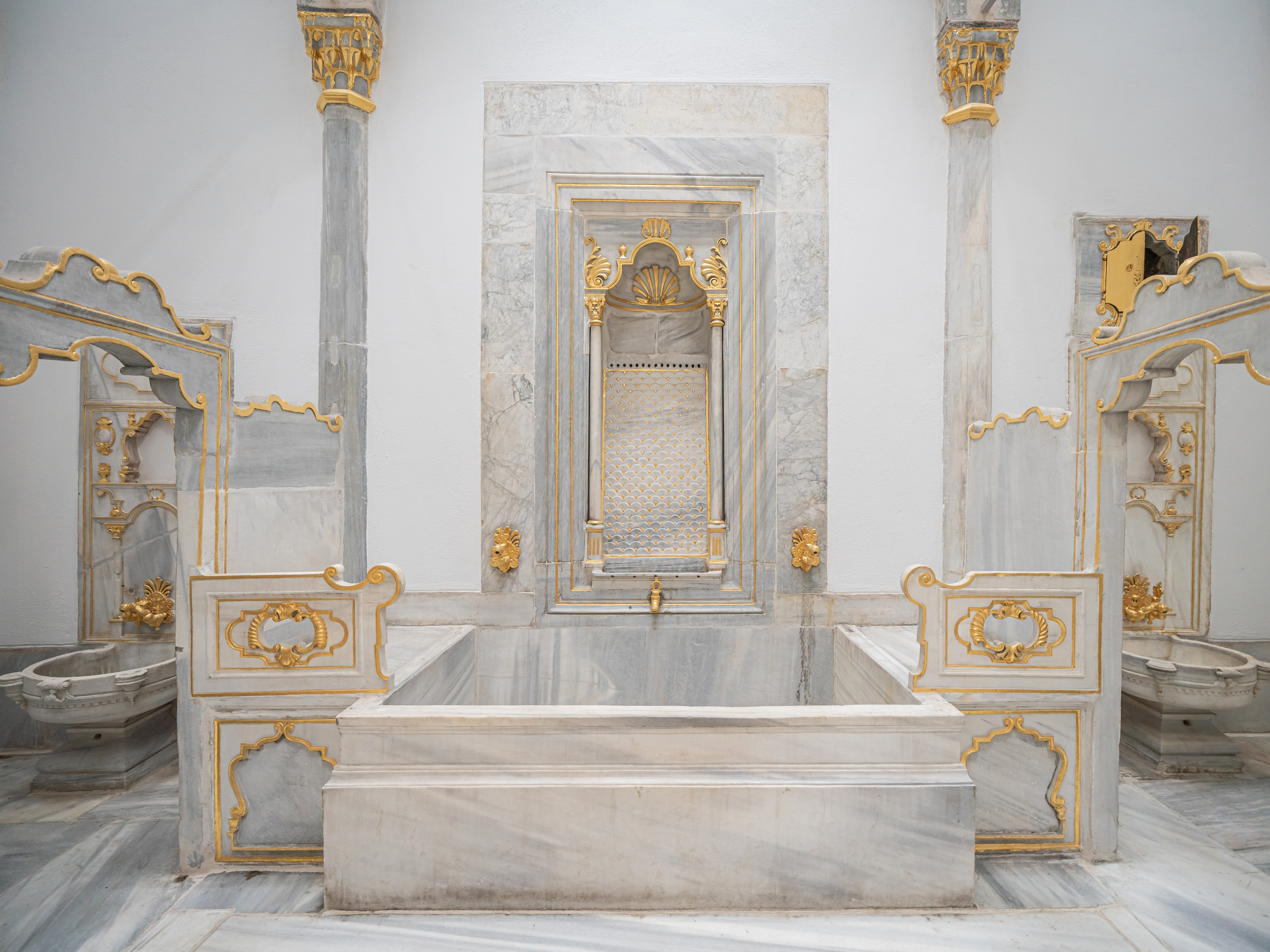
Baths of the Sultan and Queen Mother, Topkapı Palace, renovated circa 1744 by Mahmud I

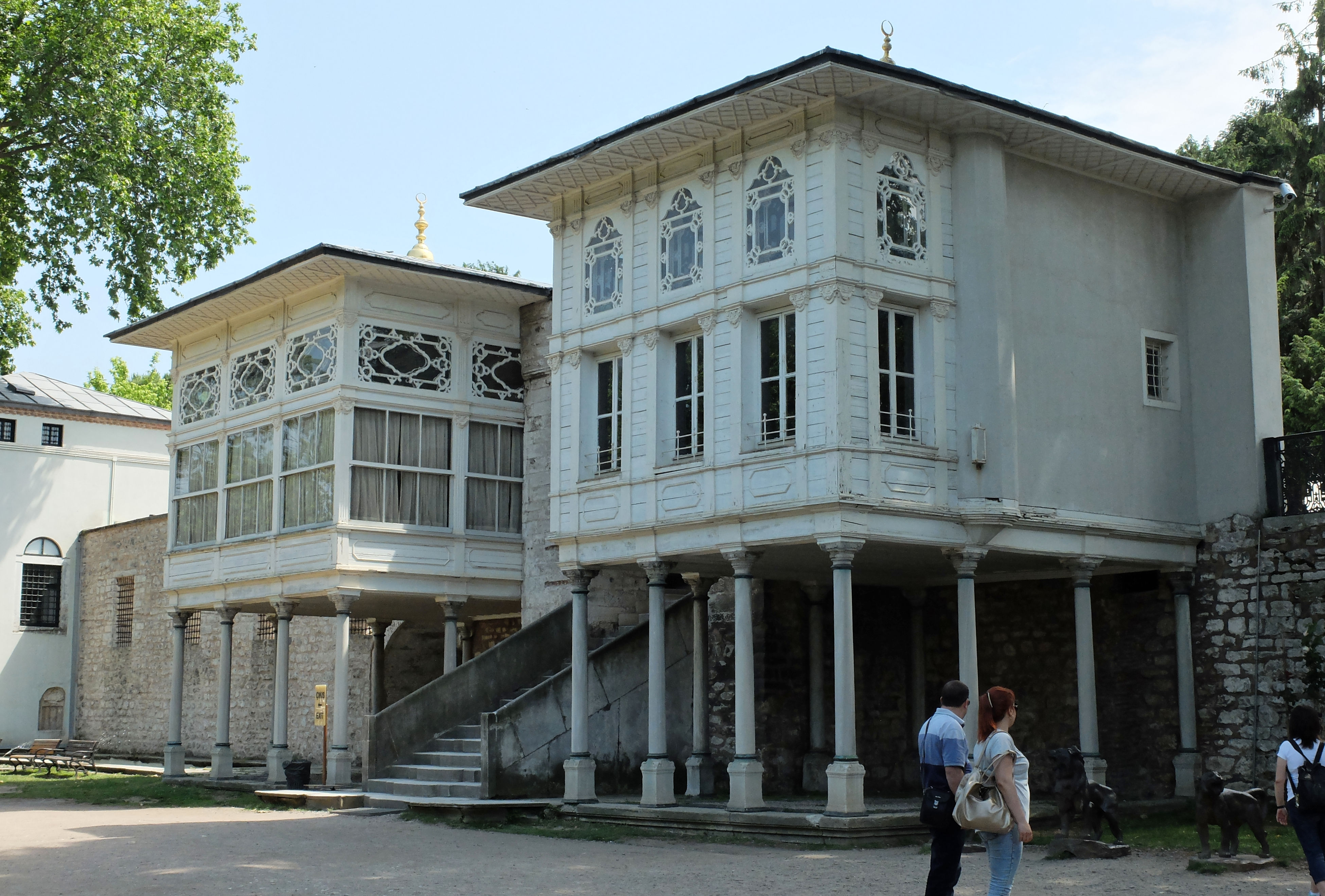
Sofa Kiosk, Topkapı Palace, restored by Mahmud I in 1752

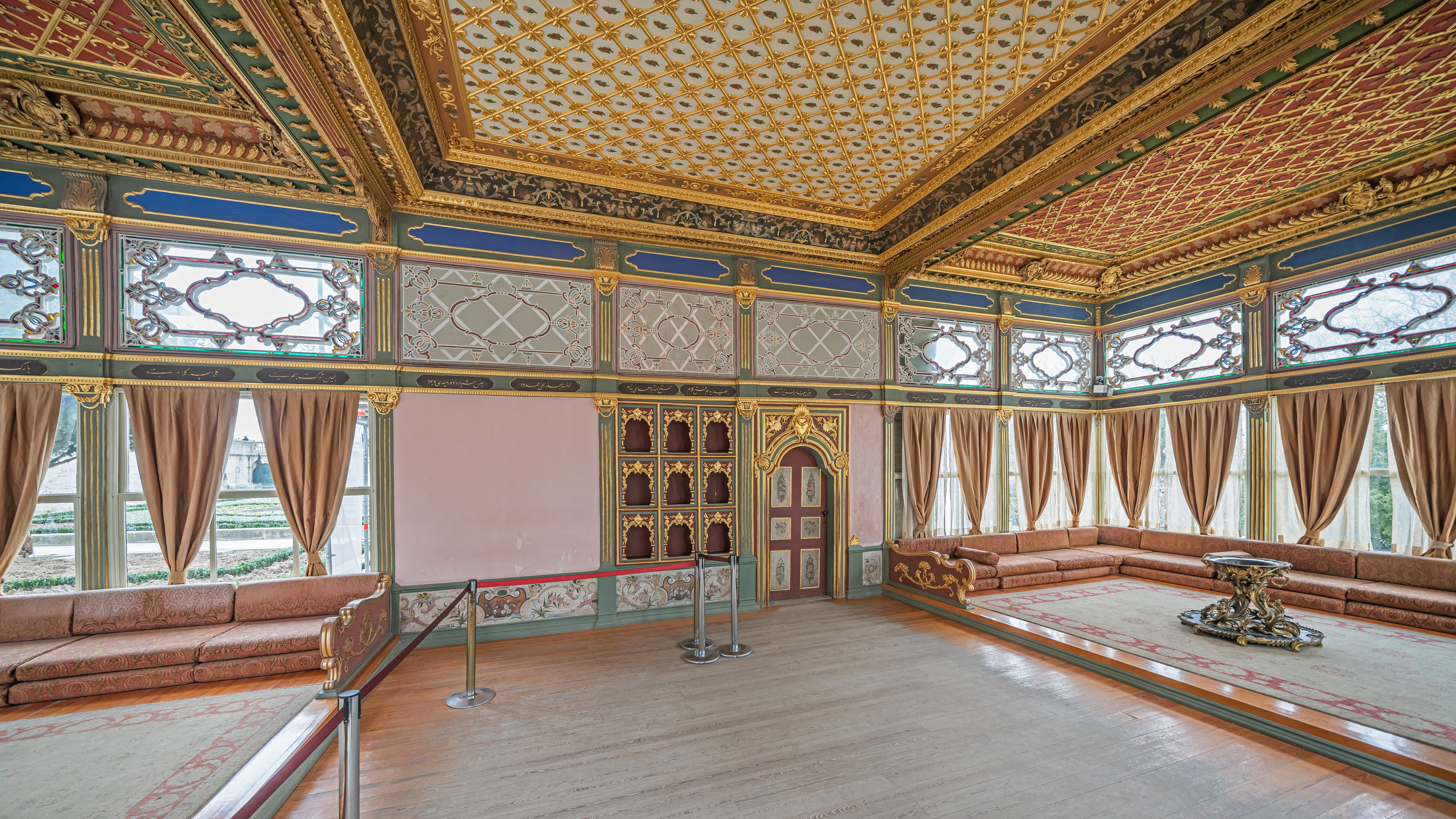
Interior of Sofa Kiosk restored by Mahmud I in 1752

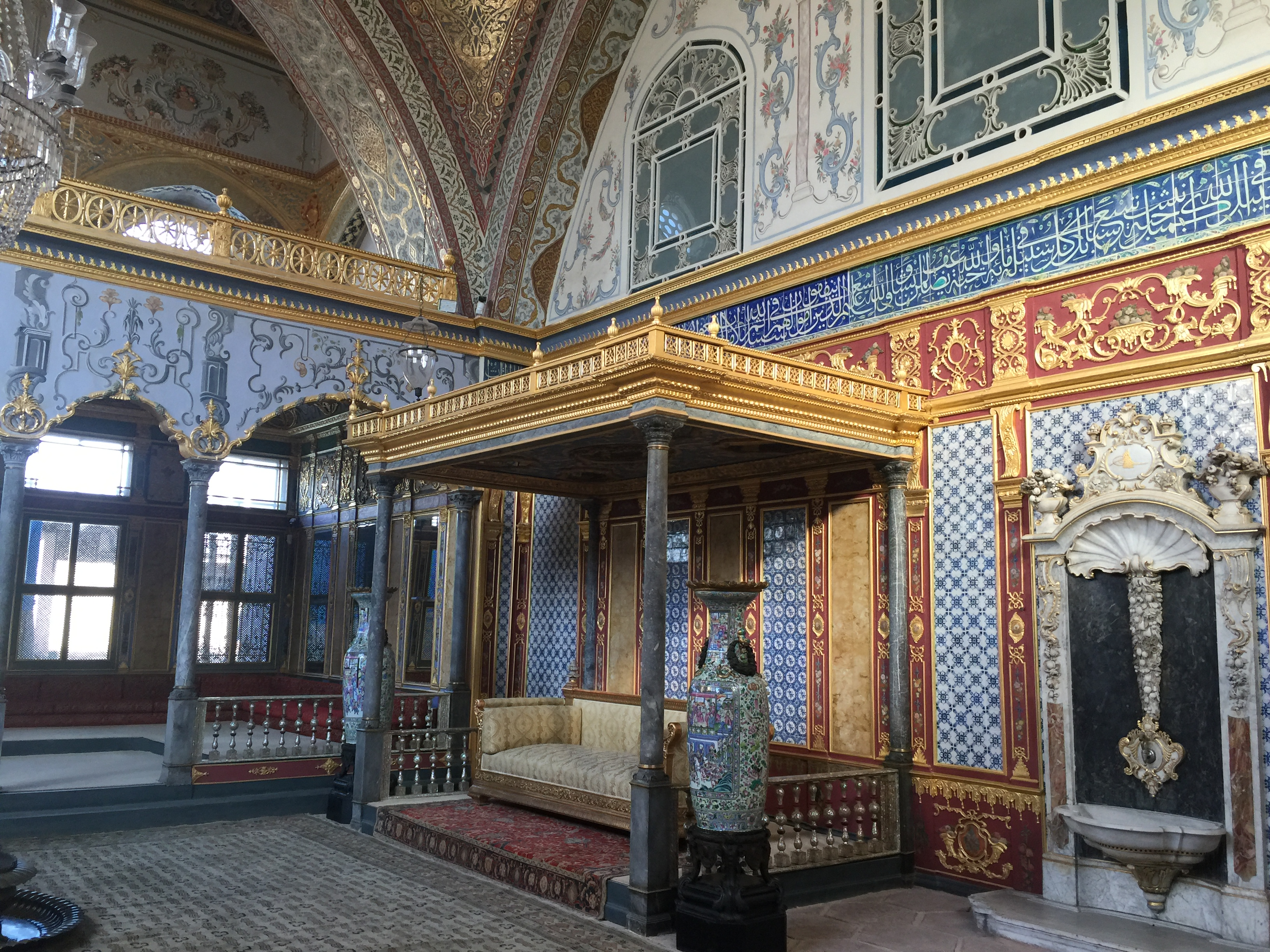
Baroque decoration in the Imperial Hall in the Harem of Topkapı Palace (18th century)

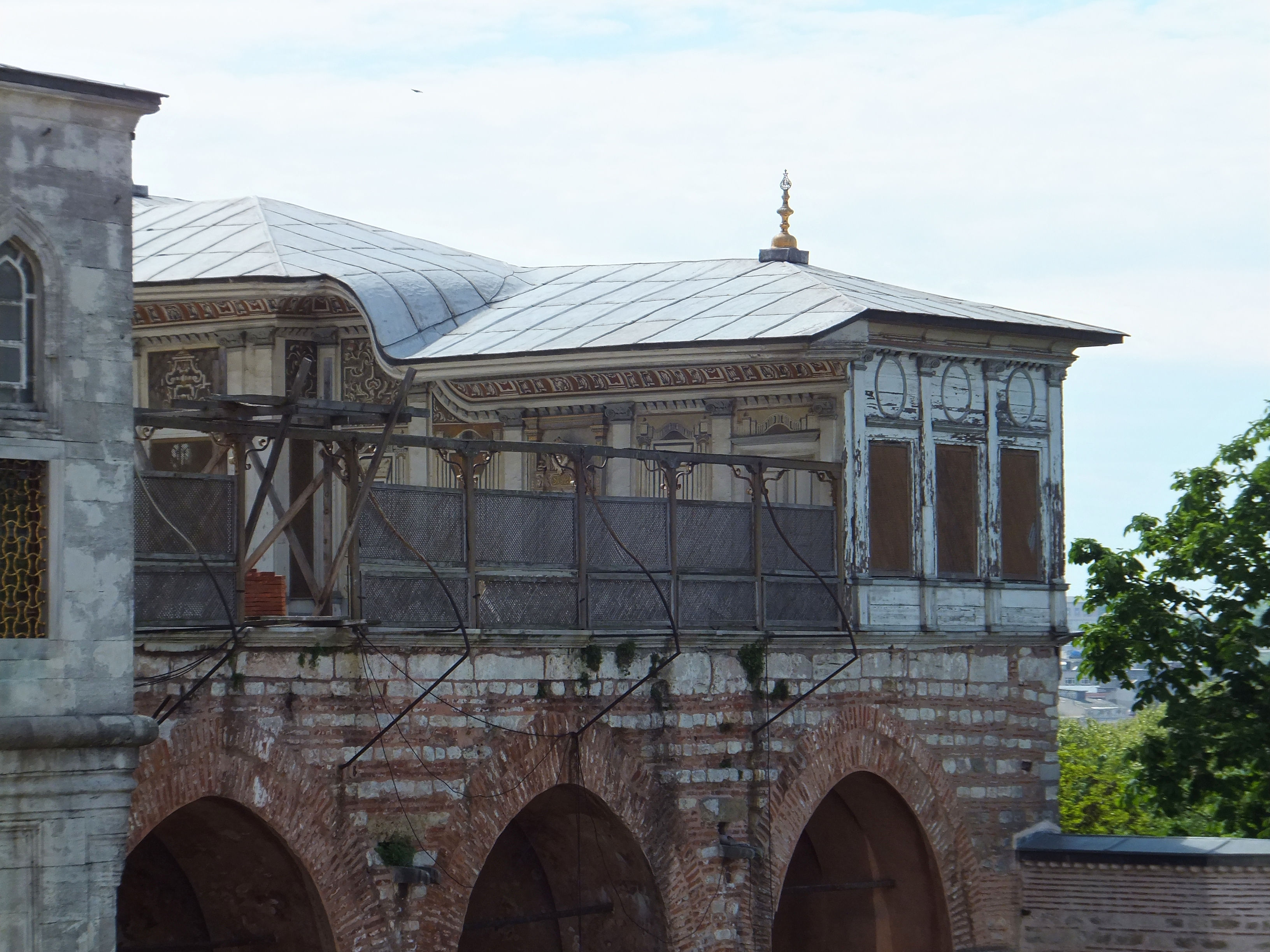
Partial view of the Kiosk of Osman III in the Harem of Topkapı Palace (1754–1755)

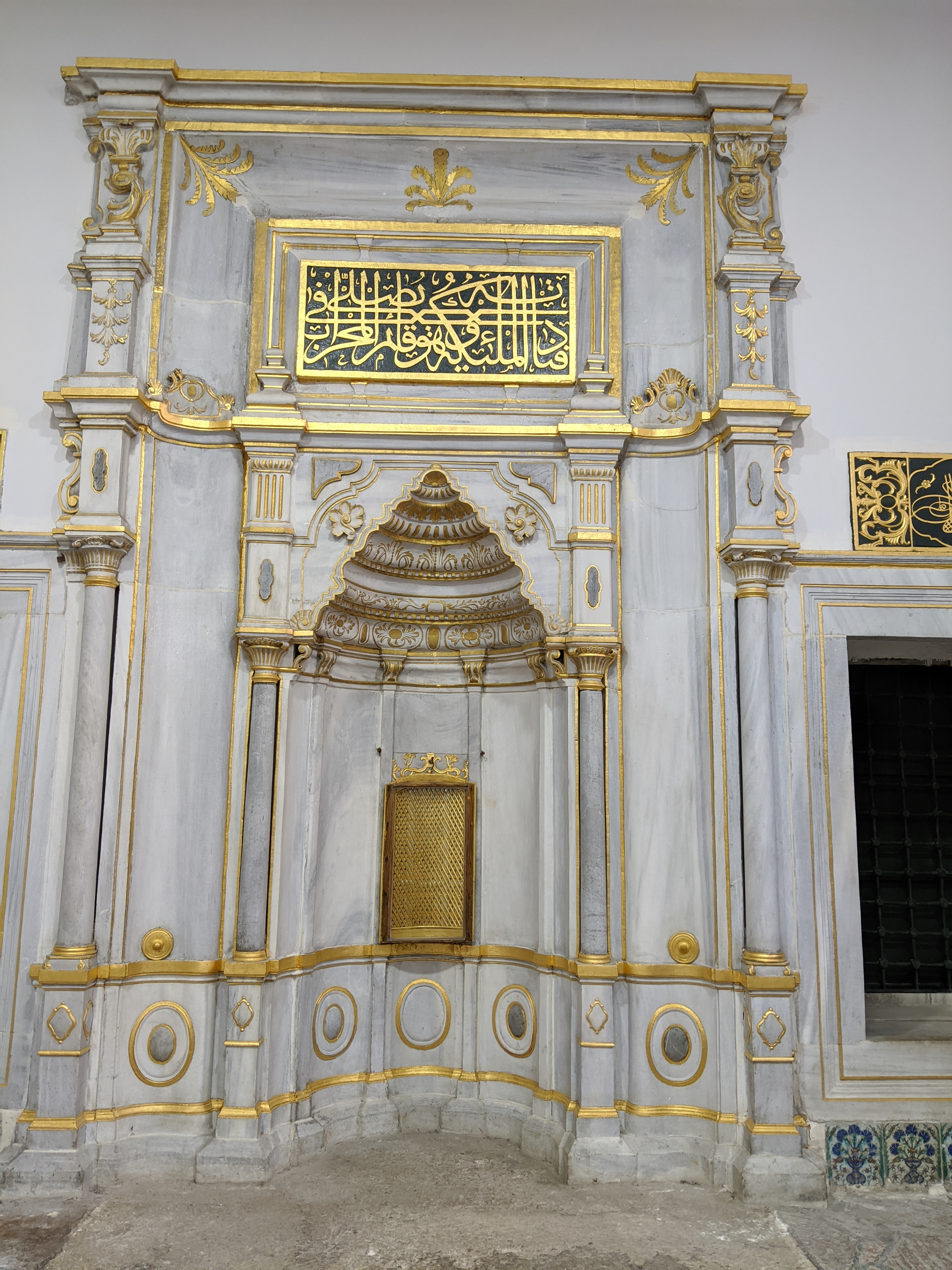
Mihrab of the prayer room in the Harem of Topkapı Palace, added in Osman III's restoration (1754–1757)

==== Other palaces ====
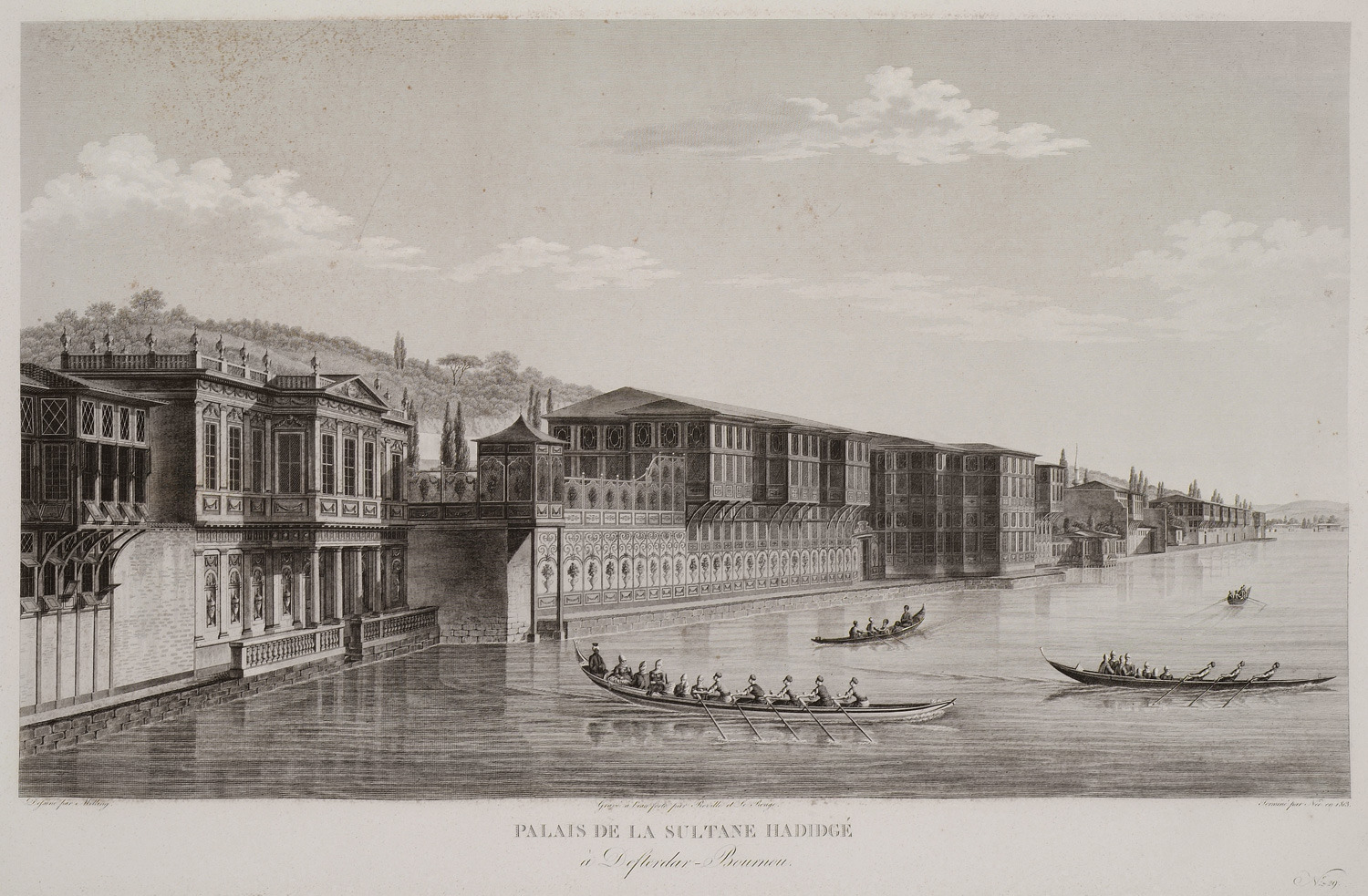
Engraving (by Melling) of Hadice Sultan's Palace on the Bosphorus, Istanbul (18th century)

As in the preceding centuries, other palaces were built around Istanbul by the sultan and his family. Previously, the traditional Ottoman palace configuration consisted of different buildings or pavilions arranged in a group, as was the case at Topkapı Palace, the Edirne Palace, the Kavak or Üsküdar Palace (at Salacak), the Tersane Palace, and others. However, at some time during the 18th century there was a transition to palaces consisting of a single block or a single large building. This trend may have been popularized by the sisters of Selim III in the late 18th century.

One of his sisters, Hadice Sultan (d. 1822), had a grand shoreline palace at Defterdarburnu (near Ortaköy) on the Bopshorus. In the 1790s she commissioned Antoine Ignace Melling to add a European Neoclassical pavilion to the palace. Along with the palace of Beyhan and Esma Sultan on the Golden Horn, her palace may have been one of the first Ottoman palaces to consist of a single block stretching along the shoreline.

Most of these palaces have not survived to the present day. Among the rare surviving examples, Baroque decoration from this period can still be seen in the Aynalıkavak Pavilion, which was restored by Selim III and Mahmud II. Beyond Istanbul, some large palaces were built by powerful local families in different regional styles.

=== Late Baroque monuments under Mahmud II ===
The Tomb of Nakşidil Sultan (mother of Mahmud II), built in 1818 near the Fatih Mosque complex in Istanbul, is one of the finest Ottoman Baroque tombs and one of the best examples of late Baroque monuments. Some details recall the earlier Şah Sultan Tomb, such as the elliptical windows above. It also incorporates some influence from the Empire style, which was being introduced in Istanbul around this time. The tomb was designed by the Ottoman Armenian architect Krikor Balian. Some of the Baroque mosques from this period feature elliptical domes, such as the small single-domed Küçük Efendi (or Fevziye) Mosque in Istanbul (1825) and the multi-domed Kapı Mosque in Konya (1812).

The Nusretiye Mosque, Mahmud II's imperial mosque, was built between 1822 and 1826 at Tophane. Its name commemorates the "victory" which Mahmud II won by destroying the Janissaries in 1826, the year of the mosque's completion. Mahmud II also built a new artillery barracks and parade ground near the mosque at the same time, replacing the barracks of Selim III which had been destroyed by the Janissaries, thus continuing Tophane's association with the age of reforms initiated by Selim III. The mosque is the first major imperial work by Krikor Balian. It is sometimes described as belonging to the Empire style, but is considered by Godfrey Goodwin and Doğan Kuban as one of the last Baroque mosques. Ünver Rüstem describes the style as moving away from the Baroque and towards an Ottoman interpretation of Neoclassicism. Goodwin also describes it as the last in a line of imperial mosques that started with the Nuruosmaniye. The mosque follows the model of Selim III's imperial mosque in Üsküdar, as seen in some of its details and in the portico and double-winged imperial pavilion fronting the mosque. The mosque was innovative in other details such as the greater use of vaults and stairways, the use of wood instead of stone for elements like stairs, and in the decoration of the dome, where the traditional circular Arabic inscription is replaced with a vegetal foliate motif. Despite its relatively small size, the mosque's tall proportions creates a sense of height, which may be the culmination of a trend that began with the Ayazma Mosque. From the outside, the mosque's most notable details are the extreme slenderness of its minarets and its two Rococo sebils which have flamboyantly undulating surfaces.

Baroque monuments under Mahmud II

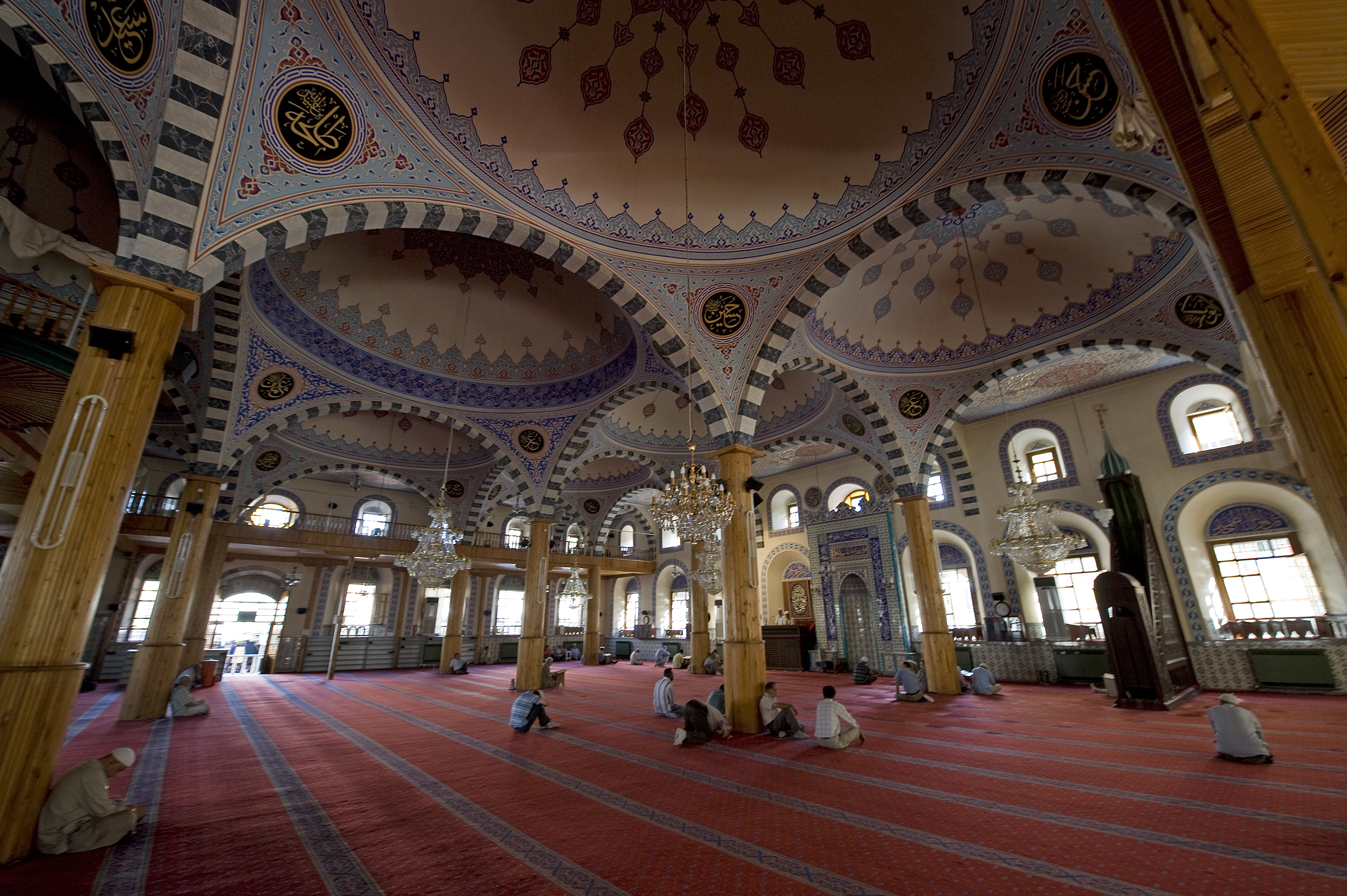
Kapı Mosque in Konya (1812)

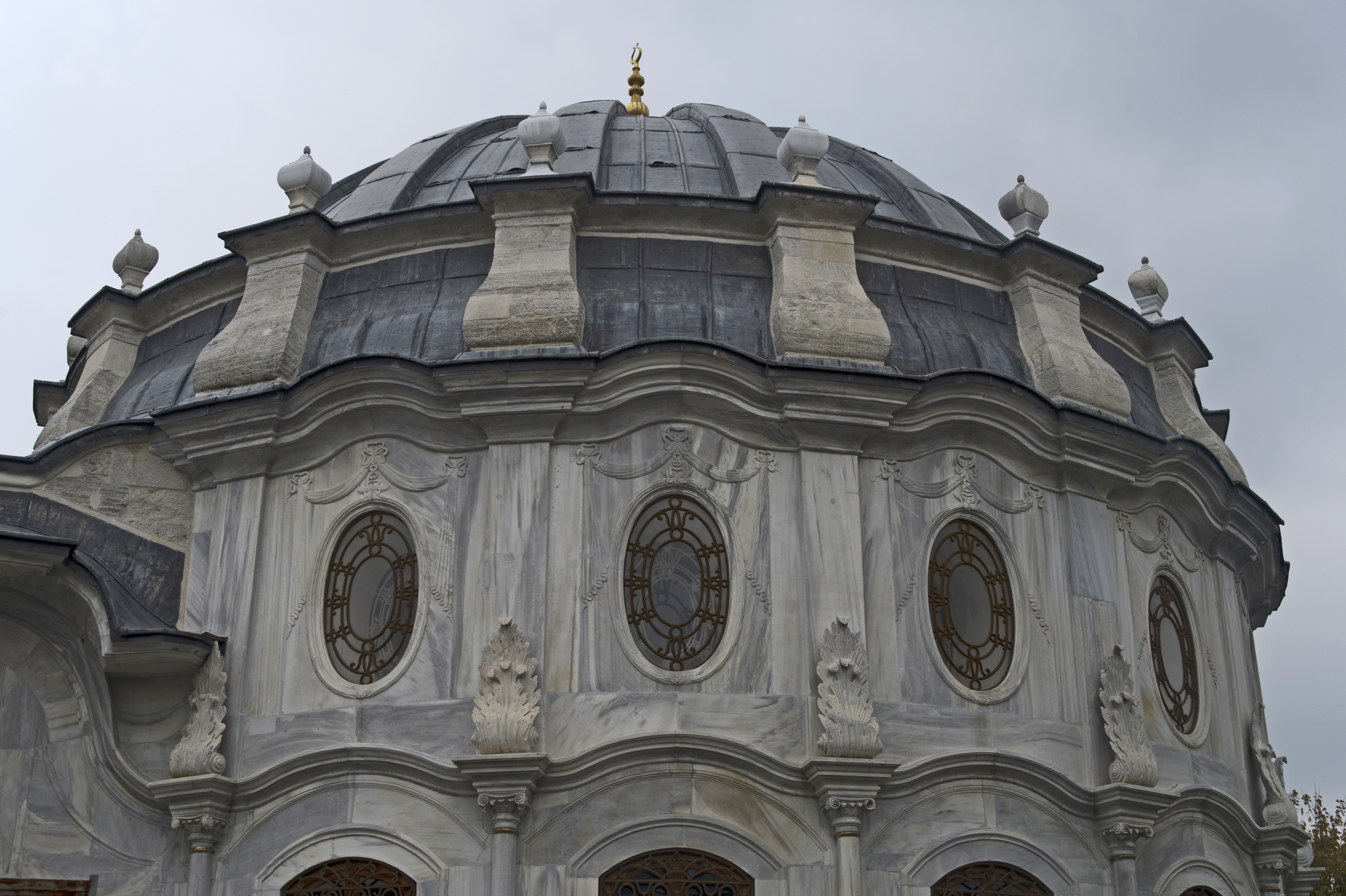
Tomb of Nakşidil Sultan in Istanbul (1818)

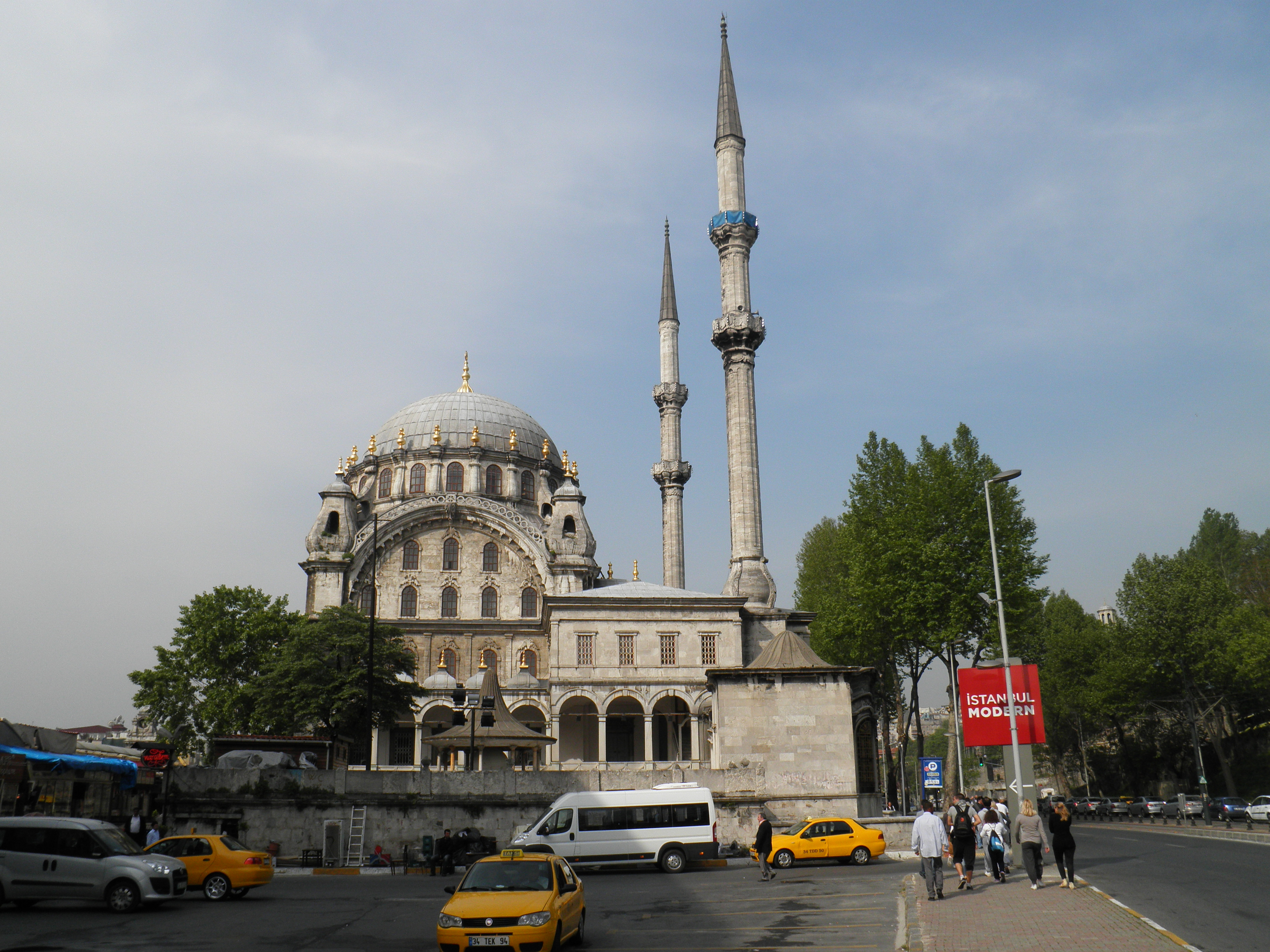
Nusretiye Mosque in Tophane, Istanbul (1822–1824)

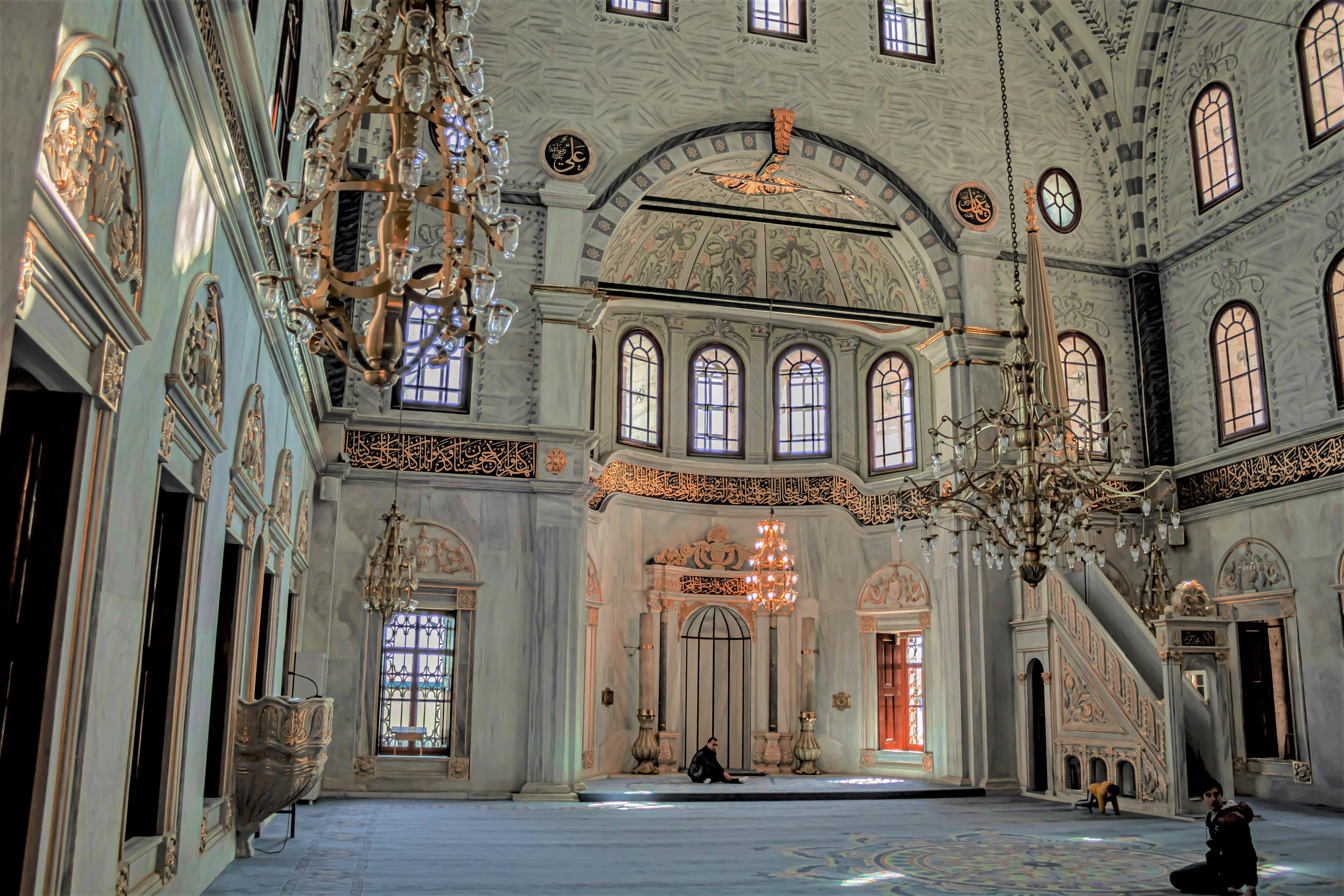
Interior of the Nusretiye Mosque

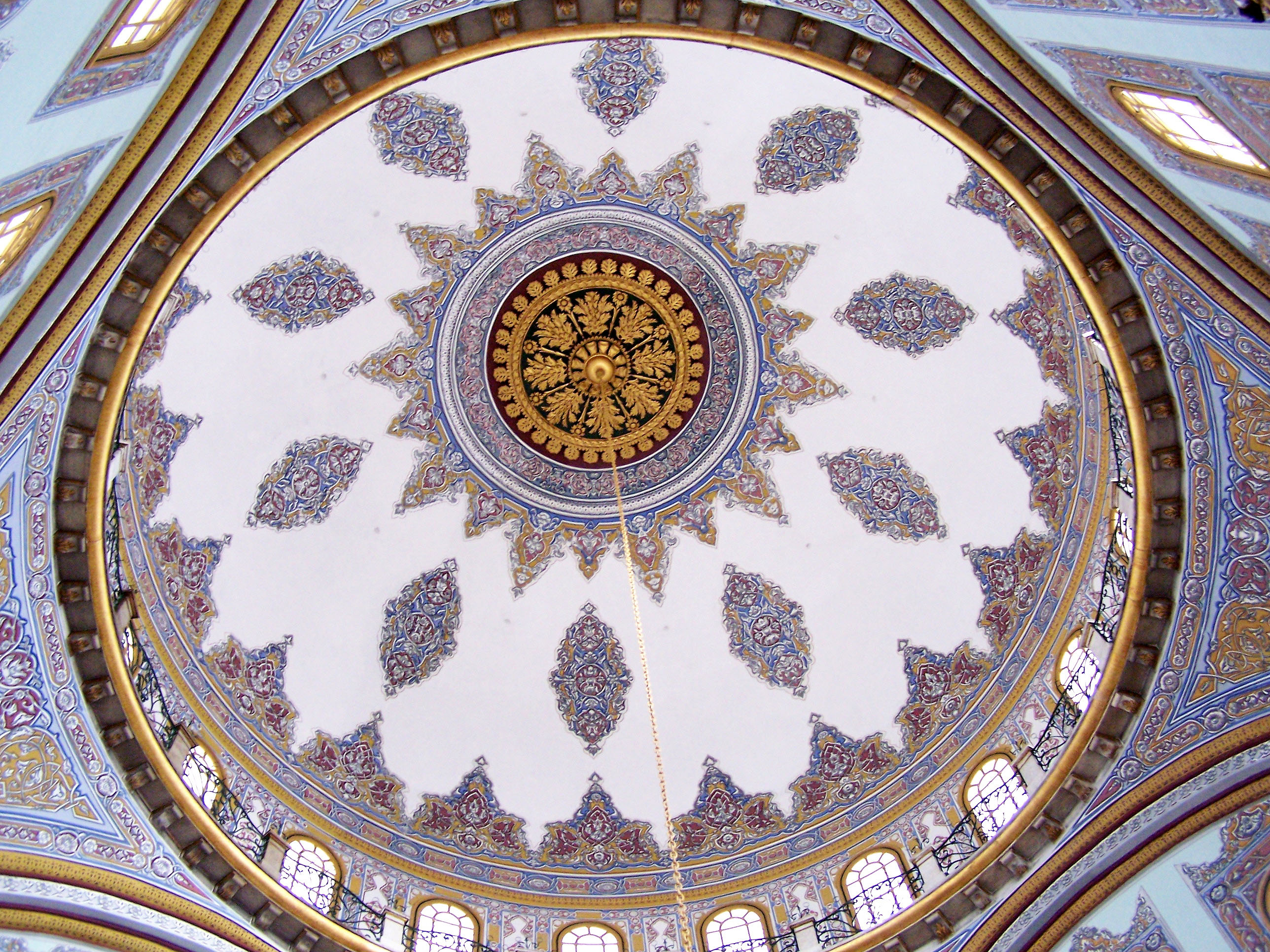
Decoration of the dome of the Nusretiye Mosque (before most recent restoration)

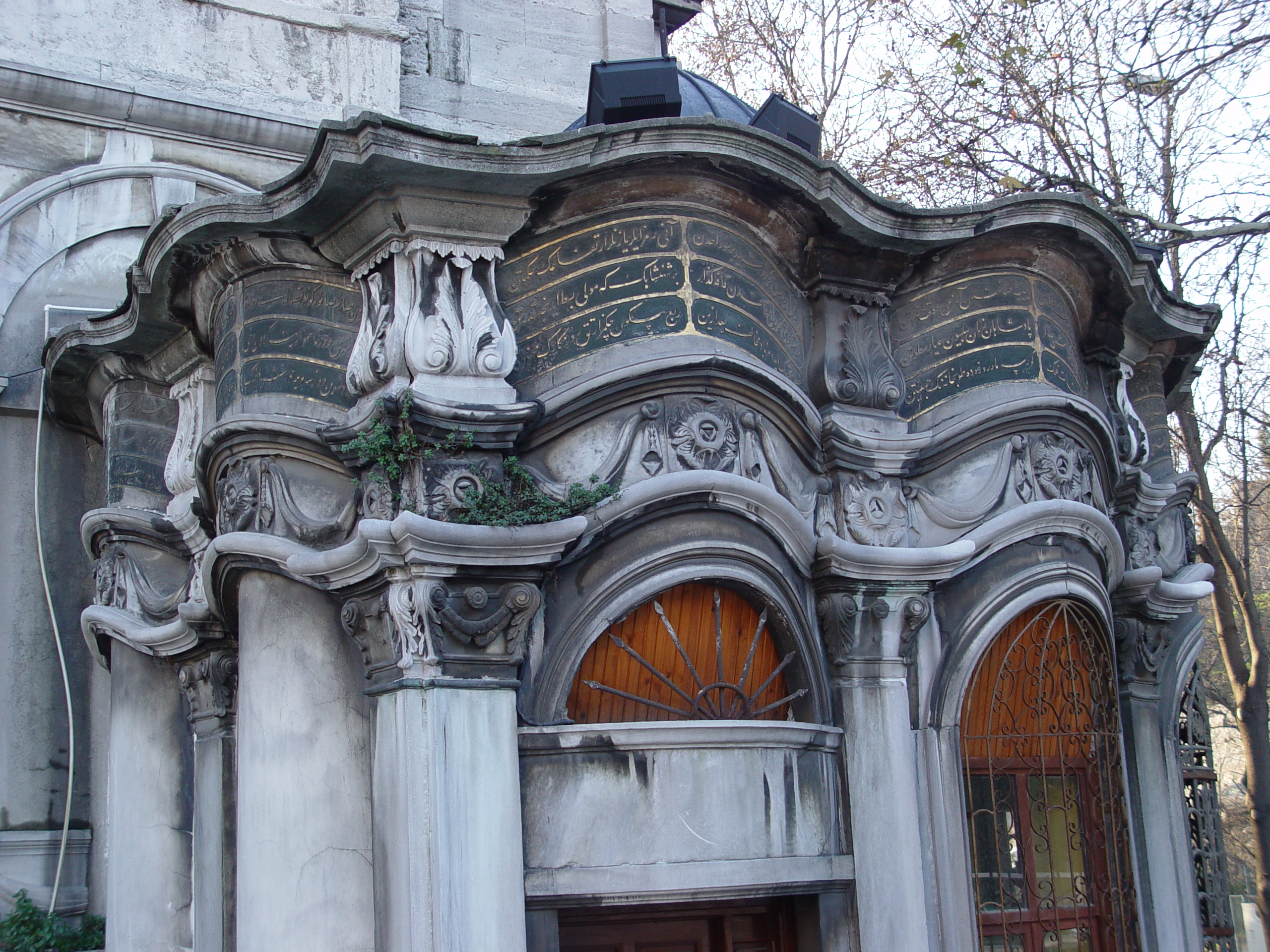
One of the sebils of the Nusretiye Mosque

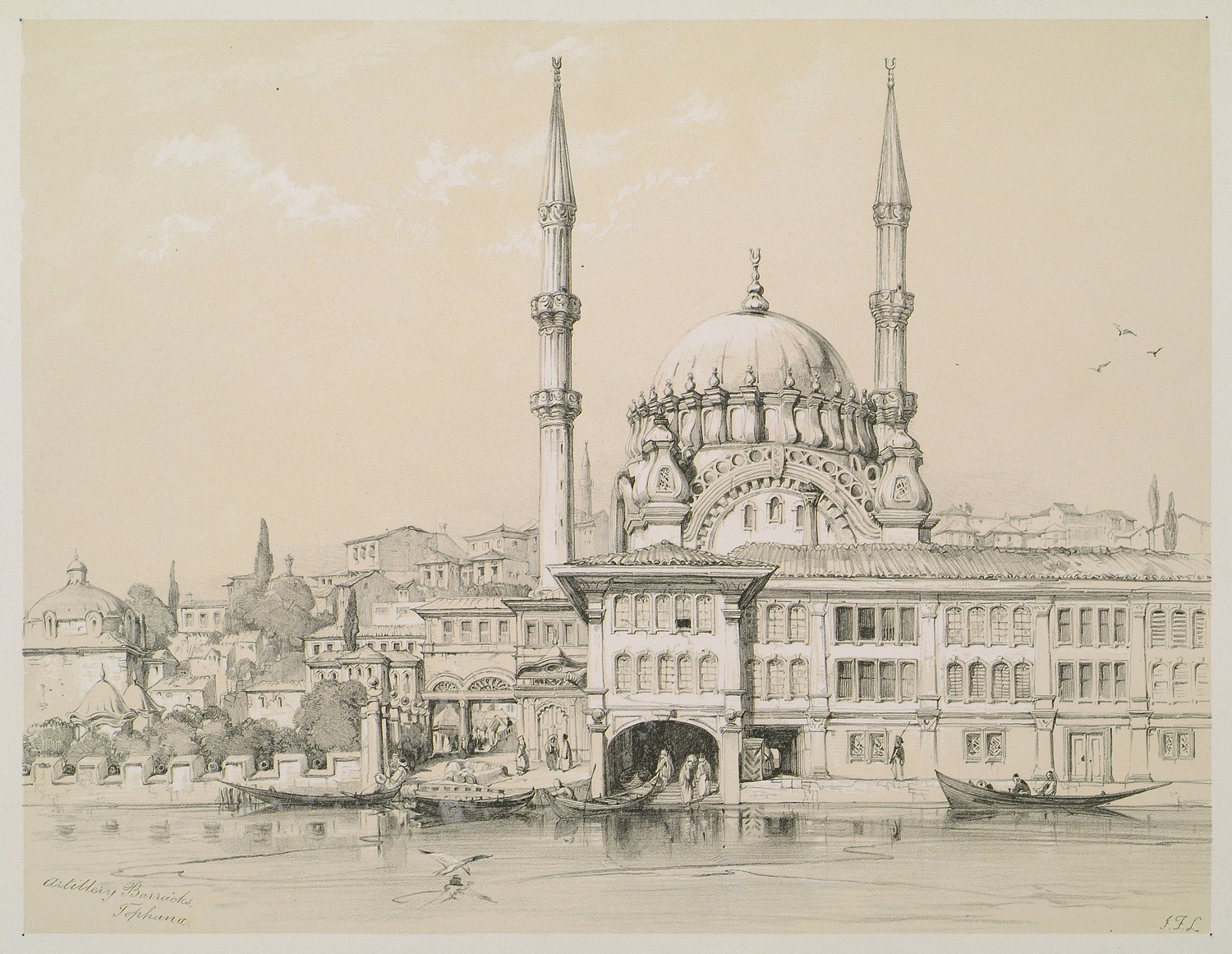
1830s illustration of the Tophane Barracks built by Mahmud II (with the Nusretiye Mosque behind)

== Architecture in the provinces ==
It was only in the 1750s that the Ottoman Baroque style began to appear outside Istanbul. The Cihanoğlu Mosque in Aydın (1756), mentioned above, is among the early examples. During the reign of Abdülhamid I, two notable provincial mosques were built in Baroque style in Anatolia: the Kurşunlu Mosque in Gülşehir (1779) and the Çapanoğlu Mosque in Yozgat (1778, expanded in 1795). Another example during the reign of Selim III is the Izzet Pasha Mosque in Safranbolu (1796).

In Athens, one small mosque survives from this period: the Dizdar Mustafa Mosque or Mosque of Tzistarakis from 1763–1764. On the island of Rhodes, the Sultan Mustafa Mosque, built in 1764 for Mustafa III, has a tall single-dome design that reflects the trends of 18th-century mosques in Istanbul. In Shumen, present-day Bulgaria, the Sherif Halil Pasha Mosque Complex (or Tombul Mosque), built in 1744–1745, is one of the few notable constructions in the Balkan region during this period. In addition to the mosque, the complex includes a madrasa, a library, and a primary school. Its style, however, resembles more strongly that of the earlier Damat Ibrahim Pasha Mosque in Nevşehir and its decoration recalls that of the Tulip Period.

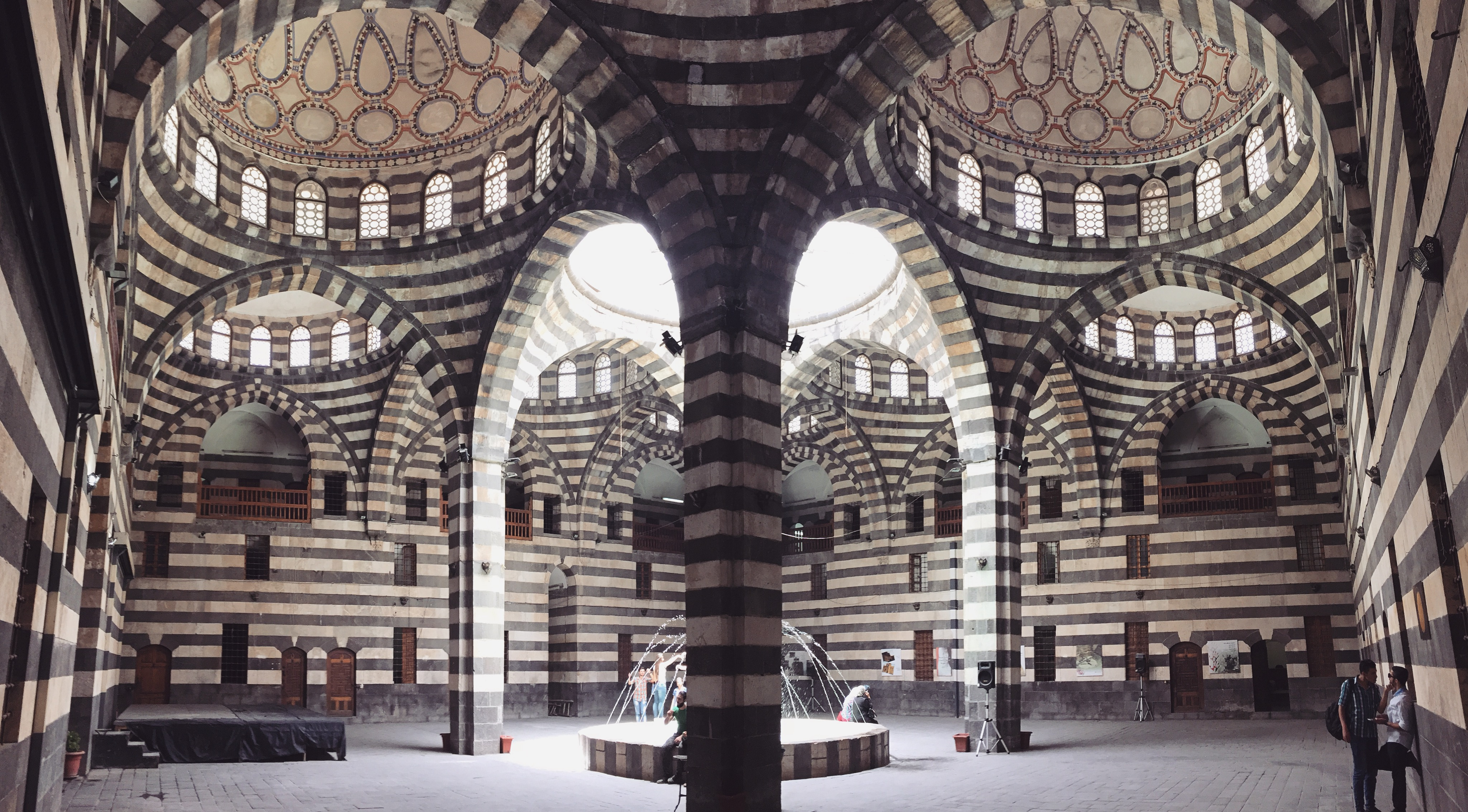
Khan As'ad Pasha in Damascus (1753)

In more distant provinces in the Middle East and North Africa, local styles continued to be employed with greater independence, as they already were in the 16th and 17th centuries. In Syria, internecine conflicts caused great damage to the country during the 18th century, but the cities of Damascus and Aleppo remained prosperous commercial centers. Damascus, the provincial capital, benefitted from the long and relatively capable governance of the 'Azm family. New palaces, caravanserais, hammams, and madrasas were built. In contrast with earlier caravanserais, which were centered around the traditional open courtyard, the multiple new caravanserais built in Damascus during this century embraced the Ottoman predilection for domes and featured domed central spaces. The most spectacular and admired building of this kind is the Khan As'ad Pasha (1753), whose main hall consists of nine domes supported by four central pillars.

In Cairo, several rare monuments sponsored by Ottoman sultans were built in the mid-18th century, demonstrating a certain level of renewed imperial interest in this provincial capital. The Takiyya Mahmudiyya, sponsored by Mahmud I and dated to 1750, was the first Ottoman complex in Cairo to be founded by a sultan, over two and a half centuries after the conquest of the city. It consists of a madrasa and a sabil-kuttab (a combination of sebil and primary school). The style and decoration of the complex is a fusion of Ottoman and local Cairene (Mamluk) styles, but it does not include any elements of the new Baroque style Mahmud I was employing in Istanbul. The most influential innovation of Mahmud I's complex was the curved façade of its sabil-kuttab, a local interpretation of the curved sebil facades in Istanbul, which was repeated in subsequent sabil-kuttab designs in Cairo. A slightly later imperial foundation, the Sabil-kuttab of Mustafa III in Cairo (located across from the Mosque of Sayyida Zeinab) in 1758–1760, still demonstrates local Cairene influences but this time it incorporates some new Baroque details. (Another sabil-kuttab founded by Mustafa III near the Mosque of Sayyida Nafisa in 1756–1757 has not been preserved.) Other 18th-century buildings sponsored by local elites were generally built in an Ottoman-Mamluk hybrid style, such as the Sabil-kuttab of Abd ar-Rahman Katkhuda (1744). While Mamluk-era configurations remained predominant, Ottoman decoration was applied in highly visible ways in some local monuments, most notably in the use of Ottoman blue and white tiles, including re-used 16th-century Iznik tiles imported from Istanbul. In the 19th century, under the de facto independent rule of Muhammad Ali and his successors, Ottoman Baroque and contemporary late Ottoman Westernizing decoration was conspicuously employed in new buildings, including the Mosque of Muhammad Ali (1830–1848) in the Citadel and several sabil-kuttabs throughout the city.

Beyond Istanbul, the greatest palaces were built by powerful local families, but they were often built in regional styles that did not follow the trends of the Ottoman capital. The Azm Palace in Damascus, for example, was built around 1750 in a largely Damascene style. The Azm family also had a major palace in Hama. In eastern Anatolia, near present-day Doğubayazıt, the Ishak Pasha Palace is an exceptional and flamboyant piece of architecture that mixes various local traditions including Seljuk Turkish, Armenian, and Georgian. It was begun in the 17th century and generally completed by 1784.

18th-century architecture in the provinces

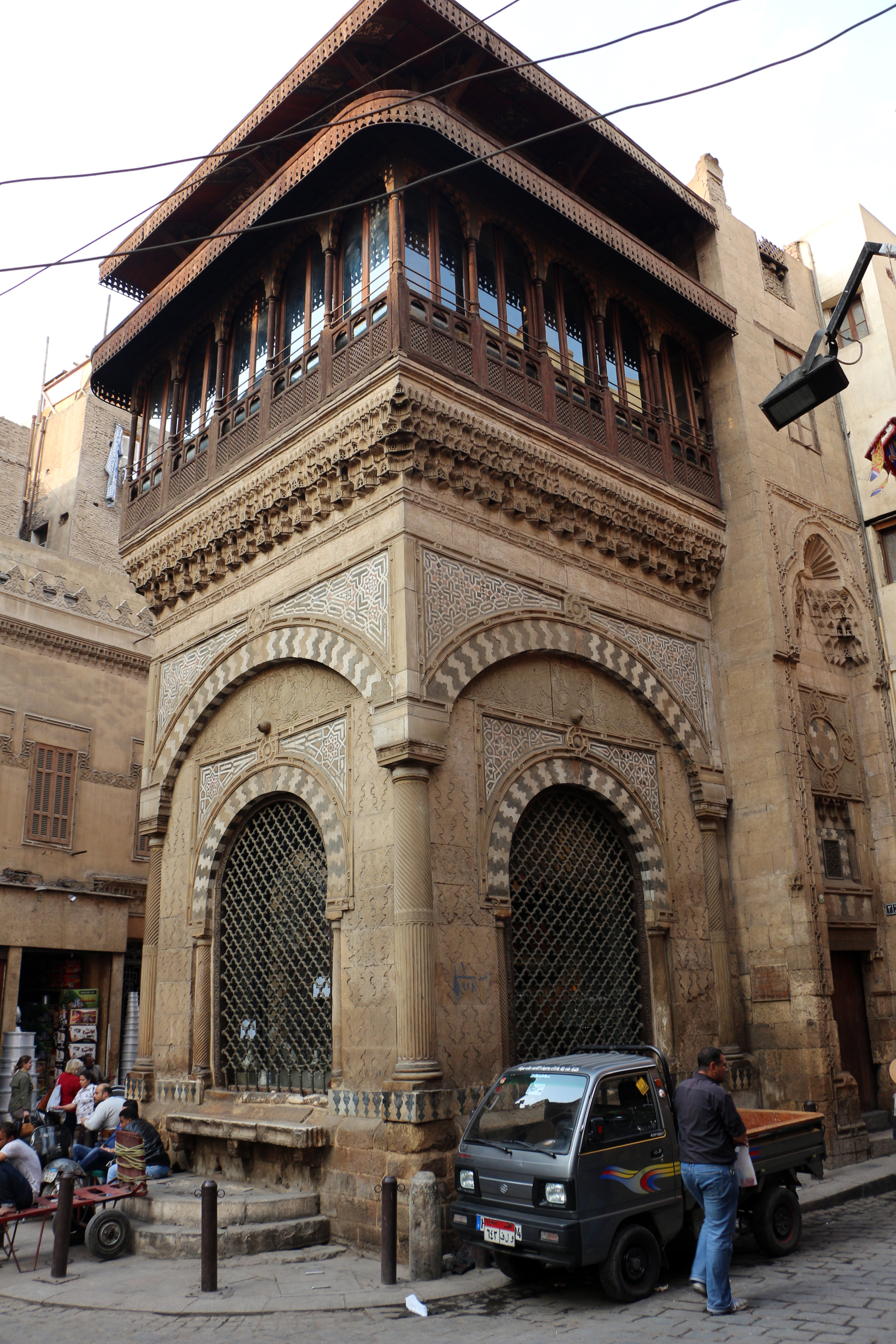
Sabil-kuttab of Abd ar-Rahman Katkhuda in Cairo (1744), a blend of Ottoman and Cairene Mamluk styles

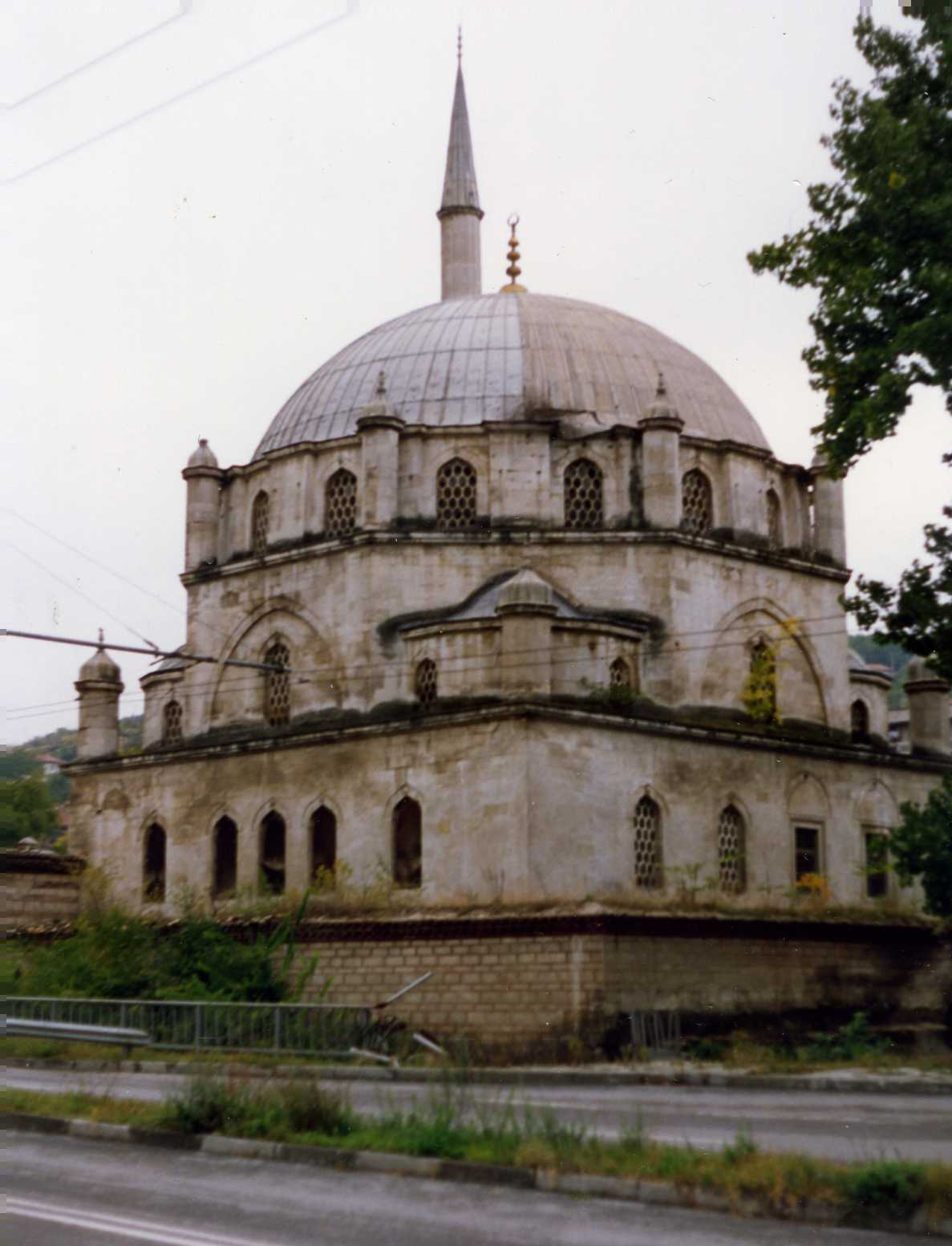
Tombul (or Sherif Halil Pasha) Mosque in Shumen (1744–1745)

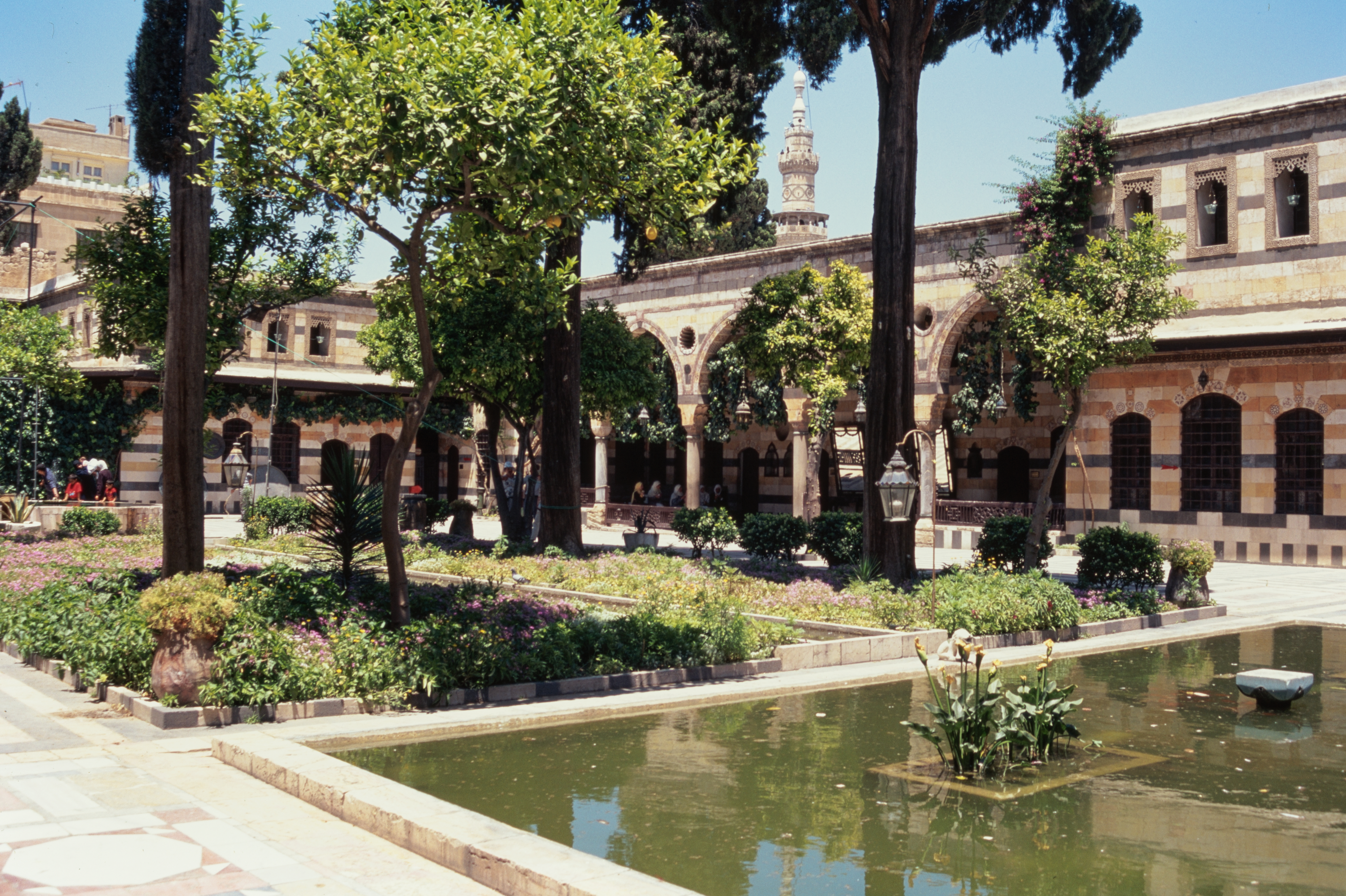
Azm Palace, Damascus (circa 1750), in local Damascene style

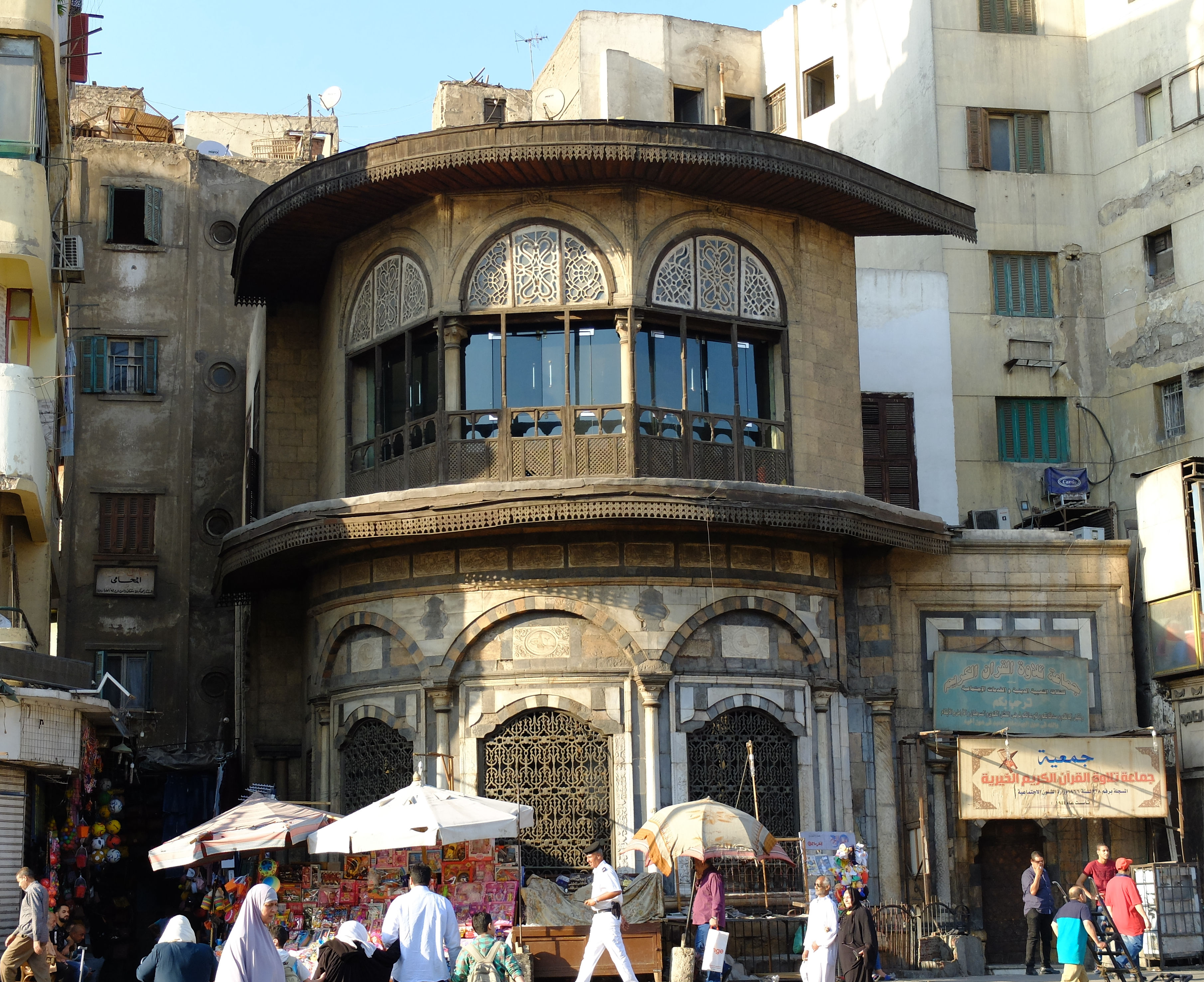
Sabil-kuttab of Mustafa III (1758–1760), featuring some of the first Ottoman Baroque details in Cairo

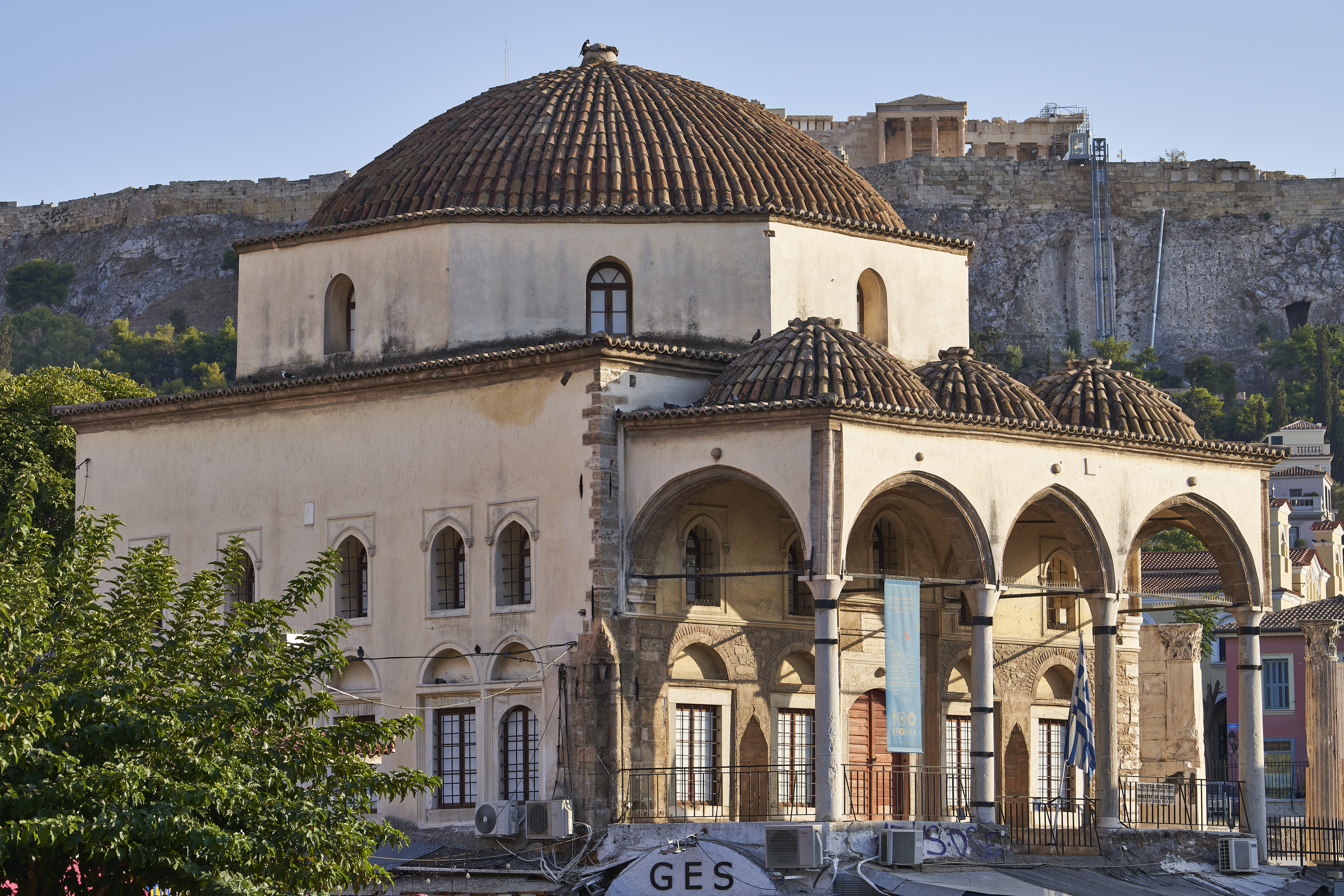
Dizdar Mustafa (or Tzistarakis) Mosque in Athens (1763–1764)

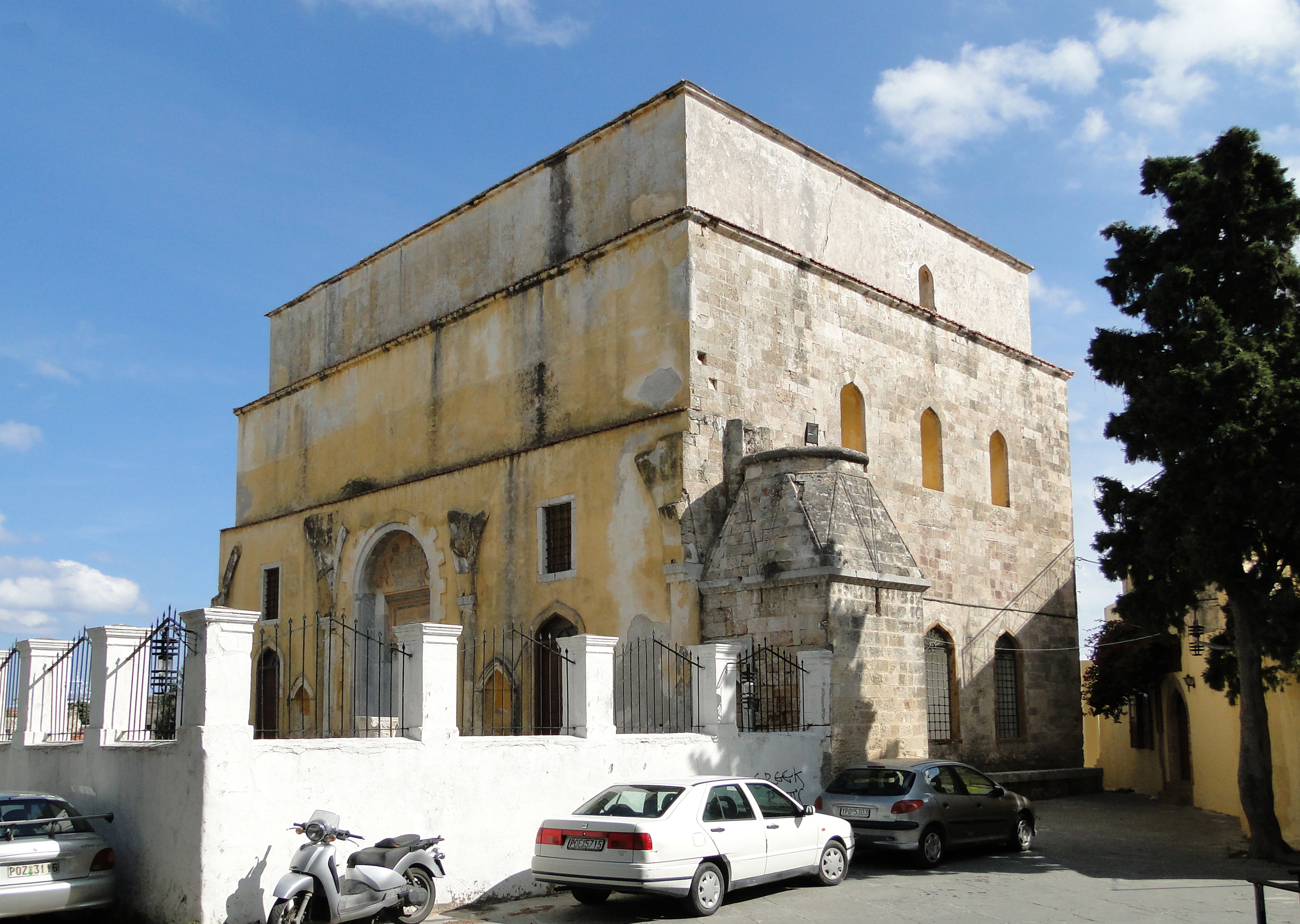
Remains of the Sultan Mustafa III Mosque in Rhodes (1764)

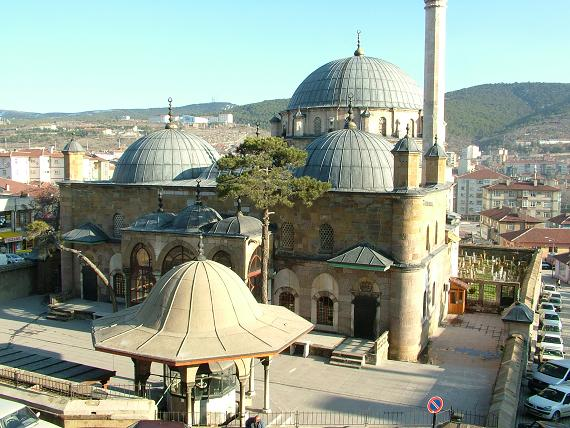
Çapanoğlu Mosque in Yozgat (1778, expanded in 1795)

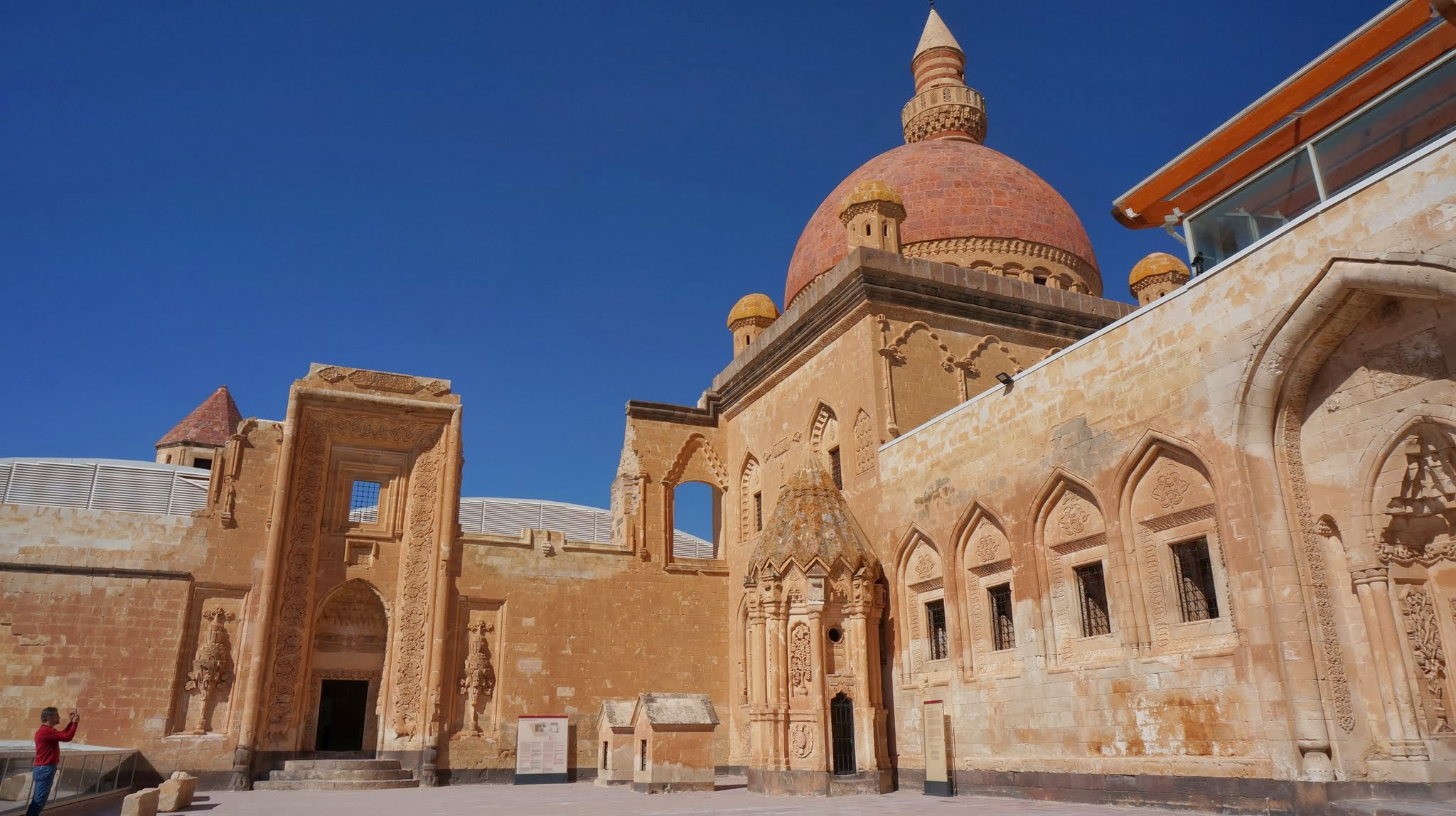
Ishak Pasha Palace, near present-day Doğubayazıt (completed around 1784)

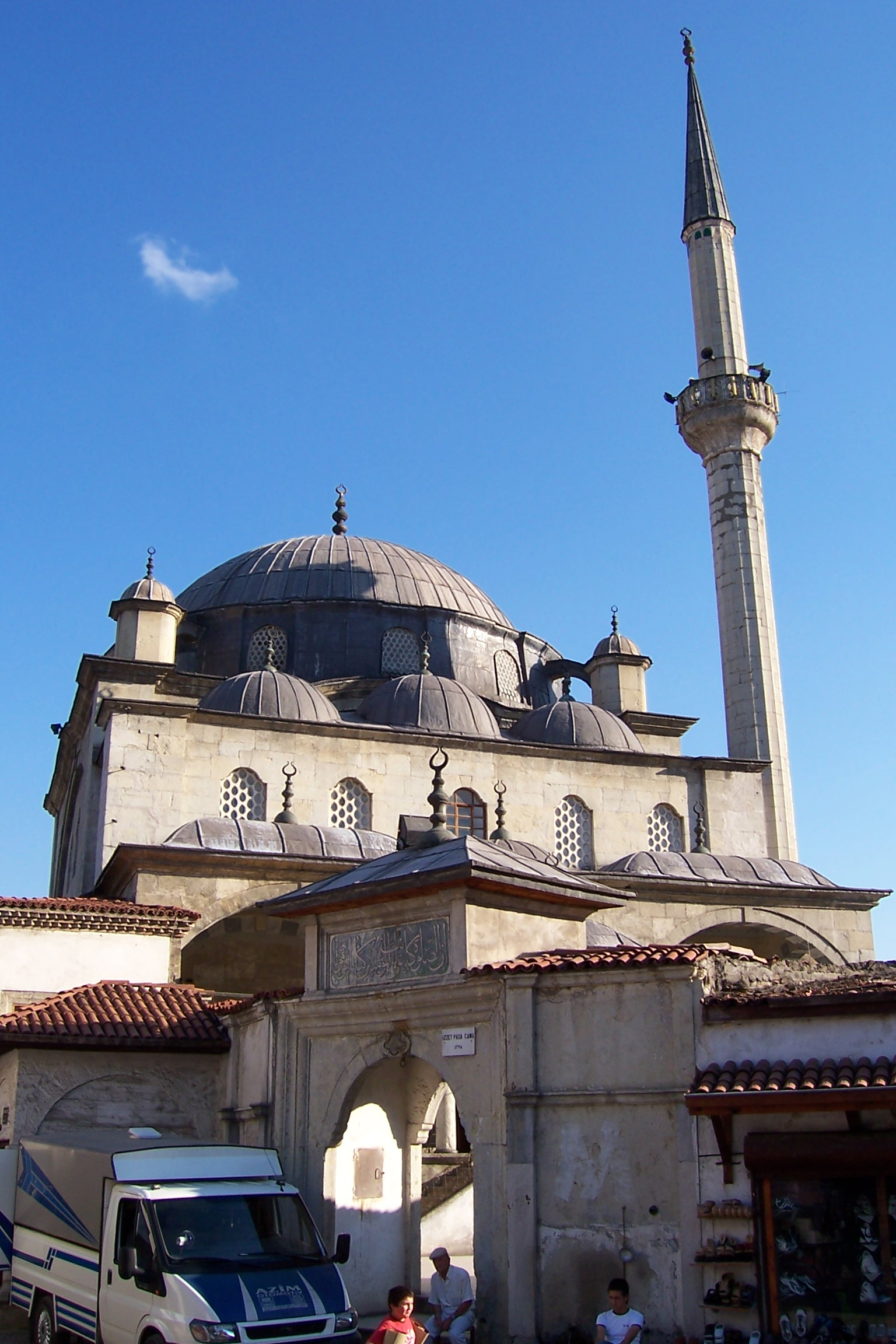
Izzet Pasha Mosque in Safranbolu (1796)

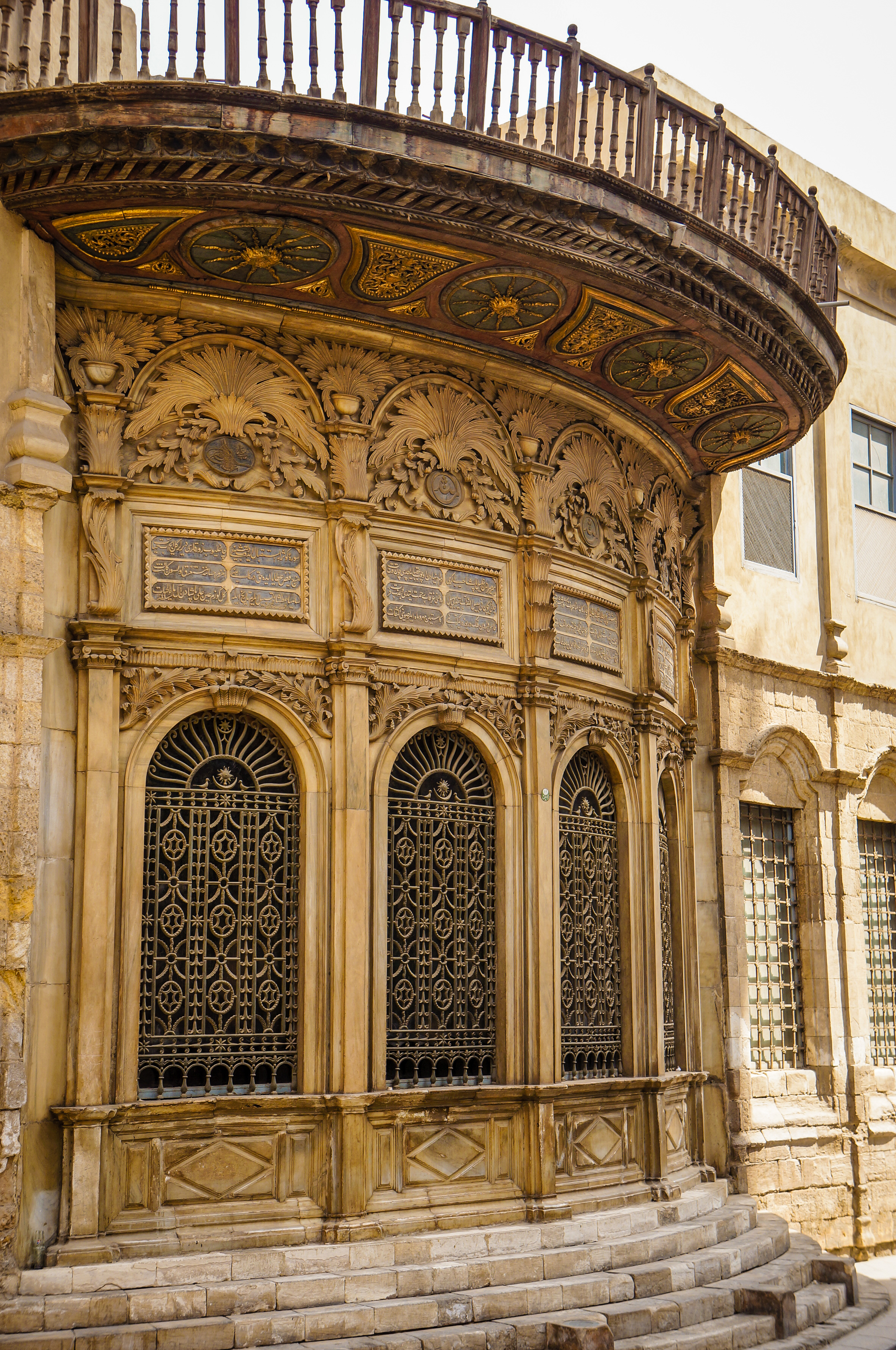
Sabil of Isma'il Pasha (1828) with Baroque and late Ottoman decoration typical of 19th-century Cairo

== Aftermath ==
The later reign of Mahmud II also saw the introduction of the Empire style, a Neoclassical style which originated in France under Napoleon, into Ottoman architecture. This marked a trend towards increasingly direct imitation of Western styles, particularly from France. Ottoman Baroque motifs and forms continued to be used during the 19th century, but they were often employed alongside other styles. The Tanzimat reforms that began in 1839 under Abdülmecid I sought to modernize the Ottoman Empire with Western-style reforms. In the architectural realm this period resulted in the dominance of European architects and Ottoman architects with European training. Among these, the Balians, an Ottoman Armenian family, succeeded in dominating imperial architecture for much of the century. They were joined by European architects such as the Fossati brothers, William James Smith, and Alexandre Vallaury. After the early 19th century Ottoman architecture was characterized by an eclectic architecture which mixed or borrowed from multiple styles. The Balians, for example, commonly combined Neoclassical or Beaux-arts architecture with highly eclectic decoration. Later trends involving Orientalist designs and Ottoman revivalism, initially encouraged by European architects like Vallaury, eventually led to the First National Architecture movement which, alongside Art Nouveau, dominated architecture in the last years of the Ottoman Empire in the early 20th century.

== Scholarly assessment and legacy ==
Scholarly attitudes towards the Ottoman Baroque and towards later Ottoman architecture have varied over time and from one author to another. Many scholars have traditionally framed post-classical Ottoman architecture as a symbol of Ottoman decline and cultural insecurity vis-à-vis Europe, lacking merit in comparison with earlier Ottoman architecture. This attitude has been progressively revised since the later twentieth century.

In his 1971 book on the history of Ottoman architecture, Godfrey Goodwin argues that the Ottoman Baroque should be viewed as a more "creative" period, despite many Turkish scholars having previously given it little credit. Turkish scholar Doğan Kuban has argued that even though it was directly influenced by the European Baroque, the Ottoman Baroque reflects a local interpretation of the style that became its own distinctive indigenous style. More recent scholars like Tulay Artan and Shirine Hamadeh have argued for a more positive evaluation of the style and for a lesser emphasis on the role of Western influence. In a 2019 book, Ünver Rüstem argues that 18th-century developments in Ottoman culture and architecture should be contextualized within the attitudes of Ottoman elites at the time, who saw their empire as an integral part of Europe and adapted ideas from the West insofar as they were deemed useful, and that they were part of early modern trends taking place on a more global scale.

The Ottoman Baroque style was also very visible in the empire and it was historically influential in shaping Westerners' conceptions of what Ottoman architecture looked like, particularly during the Romanticist movement of the 19th century.

== See also ==
- Ajyad Fortress

== Bibliography ==
- Acun, Hakkı (2011). Osmanlı İmparatorluğu Saat Kuleleri. Ankara: Atatürk Kültür Merkezi Yayınları. ISBN 9789751623706.
- Atasoy, Nurhan (2011). Harem. Bilkent Kültür Girişimi Publications. ISBN 9786055495060.
- Blair, Sheila S.; Bloom, Jonathan M. (1995). The Art and Architecture of Islam 1250-1800. Yale University Press. ISBN 9780300064650.
- Goodwin, Godfrey (1971). A History of Ottoman Architecture. Thames & Hudson. ISBN 0-500-27429-0.
- Kuban, Doğan (2010). Ottoman Architecture. Translated by Mill, Adair. Antique Collectors' Club. ISBN 9781851496044.
- Rüstem, Ünver (2019). Ottoman Baroque: The Architectural Refashioning of Eighteenth-Century Istanbul. Princeton University Press. ISBN 9780691181875.
- Sumner-Boyd, Hilary; Freely, John (2010). Strolling Through Istanbul: The Classic Guide to the City (Revised ed.). Tauris Parke Paperbacks.
