= Laleli, Fatih =

Neighbourhood of Istanbul, Turkey

Coordinates: 41°00′34″N 28°57′28″E

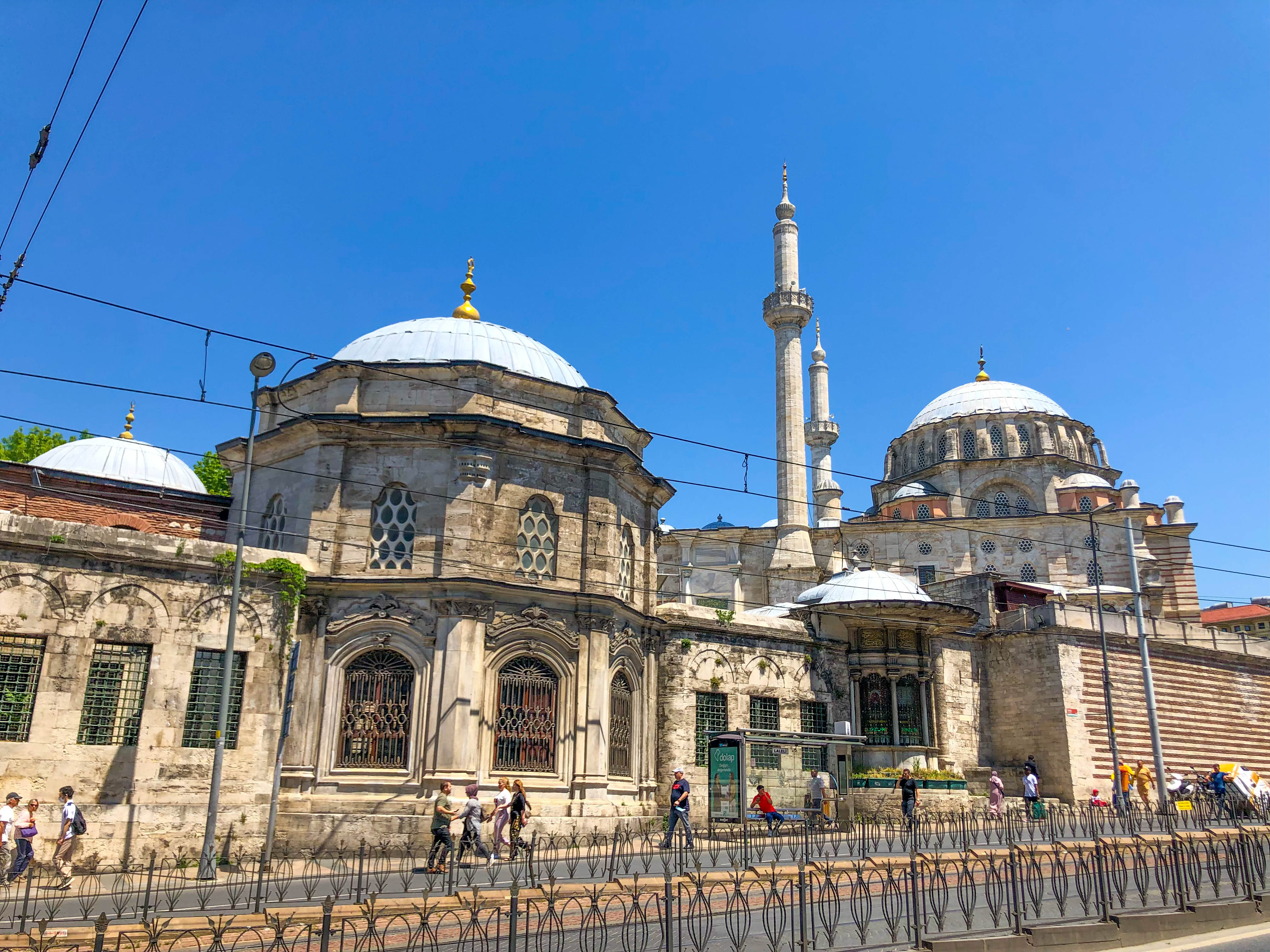
Tomb of Mustafa III and the Laleli Mosque on Ordu Street in Laleli

Laleli (meaning 'with tulips' in Turkish) is a neighbourhood of Fatih, Istanbul, Turkey, lying between Beyazıt and Aksaray. It is known for its large textile wholesaling business and is home to the Literature and Science Faculties of Istanbul University, designed by Sedad Hakkı Eldem and Emin Onat in the 1940s. It is served by a stop on the T1 tram line which runs along Ordu Caddesi.

The most prominent historic monument in Laleli is the Laleli Mosque, a work of architect Mehmed Tahir Ağa that was originally constructed in the 1760s. It was built for Sultan Mustafa III whose tomb it contains. An attractive sebil or water dispensary stands on the street side of the complex surrounding the mosque. The mosque stands above a large basement that is now filled with clothes shops.

Across the road from the mosque is the Koca Ragıp Paşa complex, also designed by Mehmed Tahir Ağa in 1762. It was undergoing restoration for much of the 2010s.

Lurking in the back streets is the much older Bodrum Mosque (AKA Mesih Paşa Cami), which started life as a 10th-century Byzantine church attached to the Myreiaion Palace. Beside it is an underground cistern, probably of similar date. Both stand on the site of a lost Rotunda dating back to the fifth century which is believed to have been the second largest such circular Roman temple after the Pantheon in Rome itself.

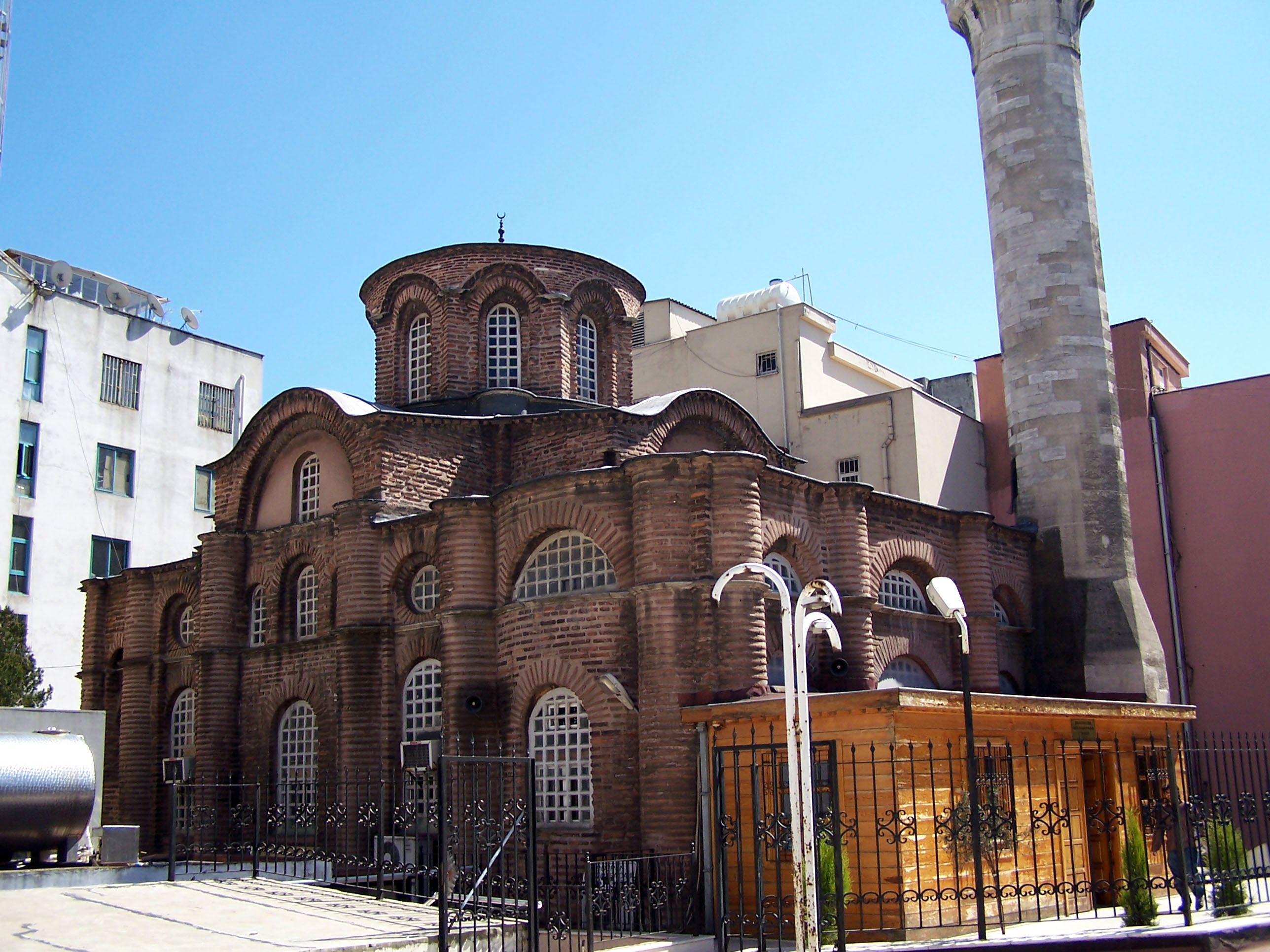
Bodrum Mosque in Laleli

Also in Laleli is the Big Stone Han (Büyük Taş Hanı in Turkish) which was probably part of the Laleli Mosque complex and contains the remains of another cistern.

Now a hotel, the Tayyare (Harikzedegen) apartment block, was the first building made from reinforced concrete in Constantinople. It was designed by architect Kemaleddin Bey to house those displaced by a fire in Fatih in 1918.

Laleli is home to the so-called “suitcase trade,” where buyers from across the former Soviet Union procure goods to sell in bazaars and boutiques back home. The trade is one of the strongest links between Istanbul and the former Soviet world, with cultural ties growing alongside the economic relationship. The largest market for the Laleli trade is Russia, followed by Ukraine, Kazakhstan and Uzbekistan.
