= Laleli Mosque =

Mosque in Laleli, Fatih, Istanbul, Turkey

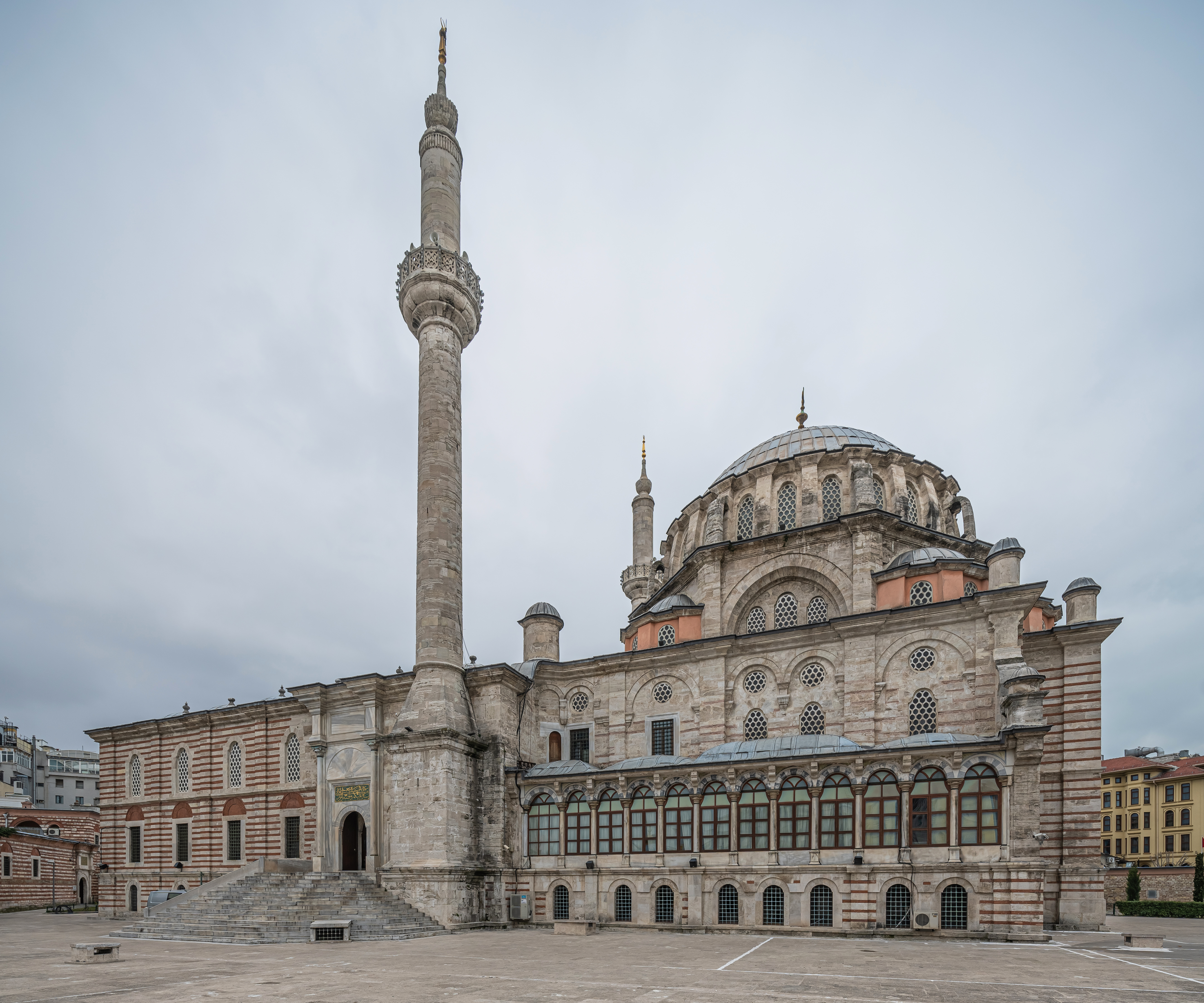

- Location within the Fatih district of Istanbul

Religion
- Affiliation: Sunni Islam

Location
- Location: Istanbul, Turkey
- Coordinates: 41°00′36″N 28°57′24″E

Architecture
- Architect: Mehmet Tahir Ağa
- Type: mosque
- Style: Ottoman Baroque
- Groundbreaking: 1760
- Completed: 1783

Specifications
- Dome height (outer): 24.5 metres (80 feet)
- Dome dia. (outer): 12.5 metres (41 feet)
- Minaret: 2
- Materials: granite, marble

The Laleli Mosque (Turkish: Laleli Camii, lit. 'Tulip Mosque') is an 18th-century Ottoman imperial mosque located in Laleli, Fatih, Istanbul, Turkey.

== History ==
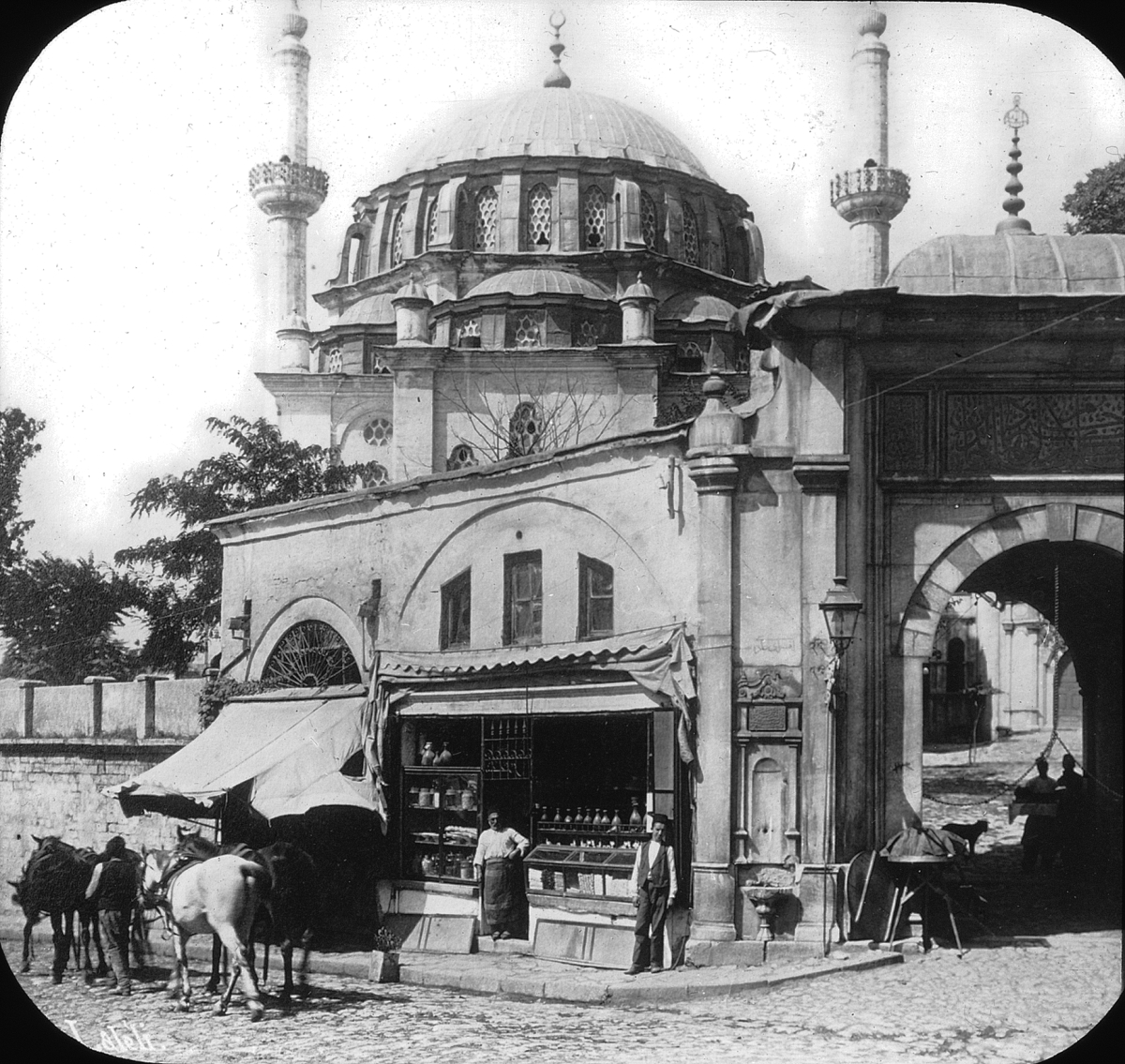
View of the mosque in 1903

The mosque was commissioned by Sultan Mustafa III to serve as his imperial or sultanic mosque. Although it was tradition among earlier sultans to build their imperial mosque in commemoration of a major military success, Mustafa III ignored this tradition by ordering the construction before any such victories. Construction began on 5 April 1760 and was completed on 9 March 1764. According to a contemporary writer, the mosque was officially named Nur Mustafa ('Light of Mustafa'), but it became popularly known as the Laleli Mosque ('Mosque of the Tulips') after the name of the neighbourhood where it was built.

The architect of the mosque is not confirmed by historical documentation, but art historians have attributed the mosque to Mehmed Tahir Agha, the chief imperial architect at the time of the mosque's completion. (Note: When the mosque's construction began, the chief architect was Hacı Ahmed Agha, but he probably led a team of architects rather than necessarily being the main designer. Mehmed Tahir Agha succeeded him in this post prior to the mosque's completion. Historical records show that Mehmed Tahir was closely involved with other projects of the time and that he received a robe of honour from the sultan when the mosque was completed. This indicates that he was probably the one most responsible for the mosque's design.) On average, about 770 workers were employed in the project and about two thirds of them were non-Muslims, the rest being Muslim.

The mosque was the centerpiece of a larger complex (külliye) that included the Mustafa III's tomb, a nearby caravanserai which provided some revenues to the complex, a sebil, and a madrasa. Mustafa III was buried in the mausoleum attached to the complex after his death in 1774. The mosque and its complex were damaged by the 1766 earthquake and, according to Ünver Rüstem, by a fire in 1783. In 1783 it was fully restored. The restoration, which Doğan Kuban attributes to the architect Seyit Mustafa Agha, preserved the original mosque's appearance. The mausoleum's façade was updated with new marble window frames in the early 19th century. The madrasa of the complex was destroyed by fire in 1911.

== Architecture ==
The mosque was built in the Ottoman Baroque style of its time. The layout is based on that of the earlier Selimiye Mosque of Edirne from the classical period, in accordance with Mustafa III's wishes. The decoration of the mosque and its complex is firmly baroque. The mosque incorporates thus the visual style of the earlier Nuruosmaniye Mosque – the first imperial mosque in the Ottoman Baroque style, completed by Mustafa III's predecessor – but in a more restrained way that integrates it with more traditional Ottoman architecture.

=== Exterior ===
The mosque was built on a high terrace over a complex of vaulted shops, whose rents were intended to financially support the mosque complex. Underneath the mosque structure itself is a great hall, supported by eight enormous pillars with a fountain in the center.

The mosque is oriented along a northwest–southeast axis, and has a rectangular courtyard about twice the size of the prayer hall to the northwest. This courtyard has a continuous arcade with eighteen domed bays and an ablution fountain in the center. The mosque itself has a brick and masonry base, with a masonry superstructure and octagonal drum supporting the dome. There are two minarets located at either end of the portico flanking the courtyard entrances.

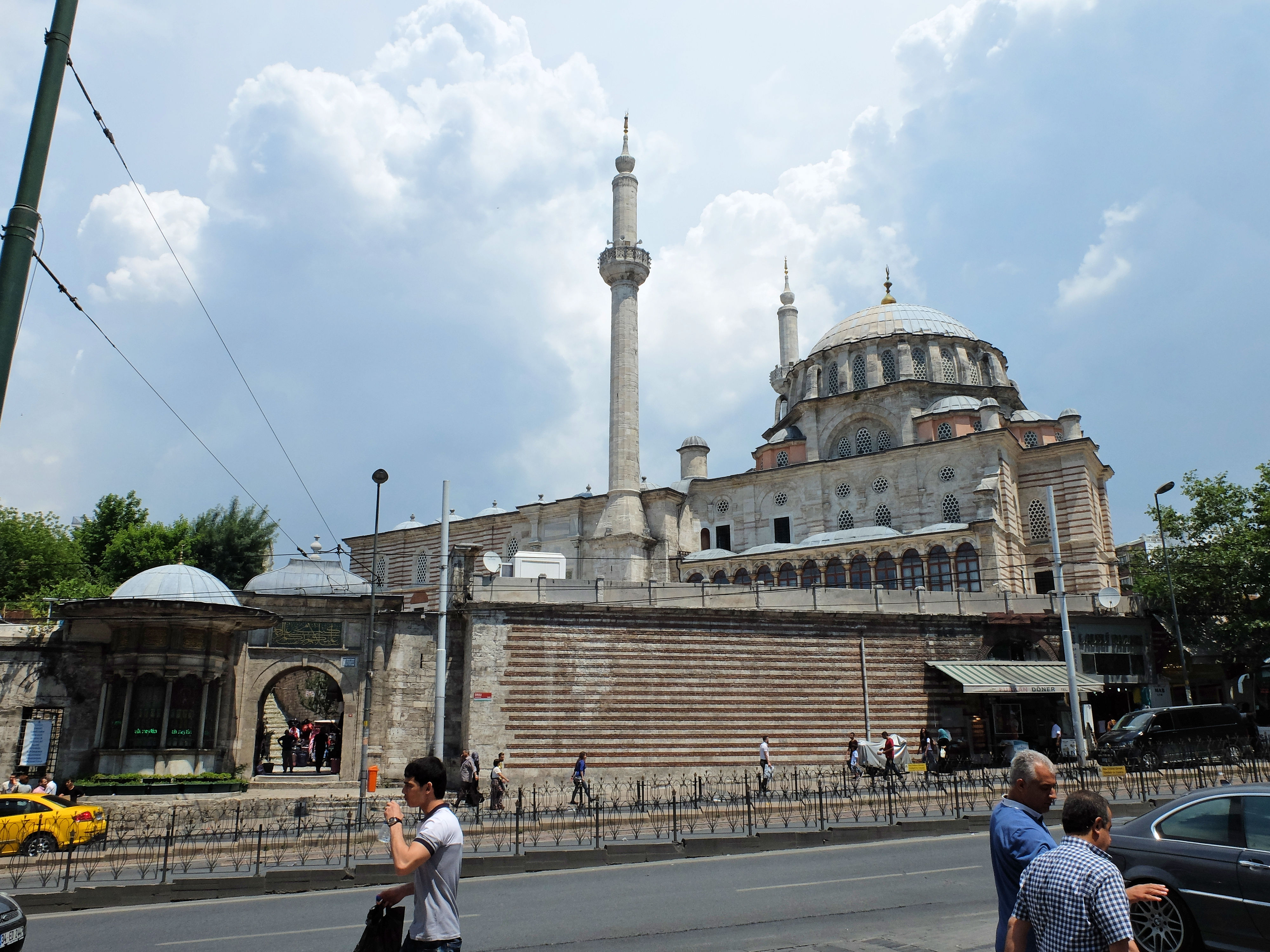
Exterior of the mosque complex, seen from the south (from Ordu Street)

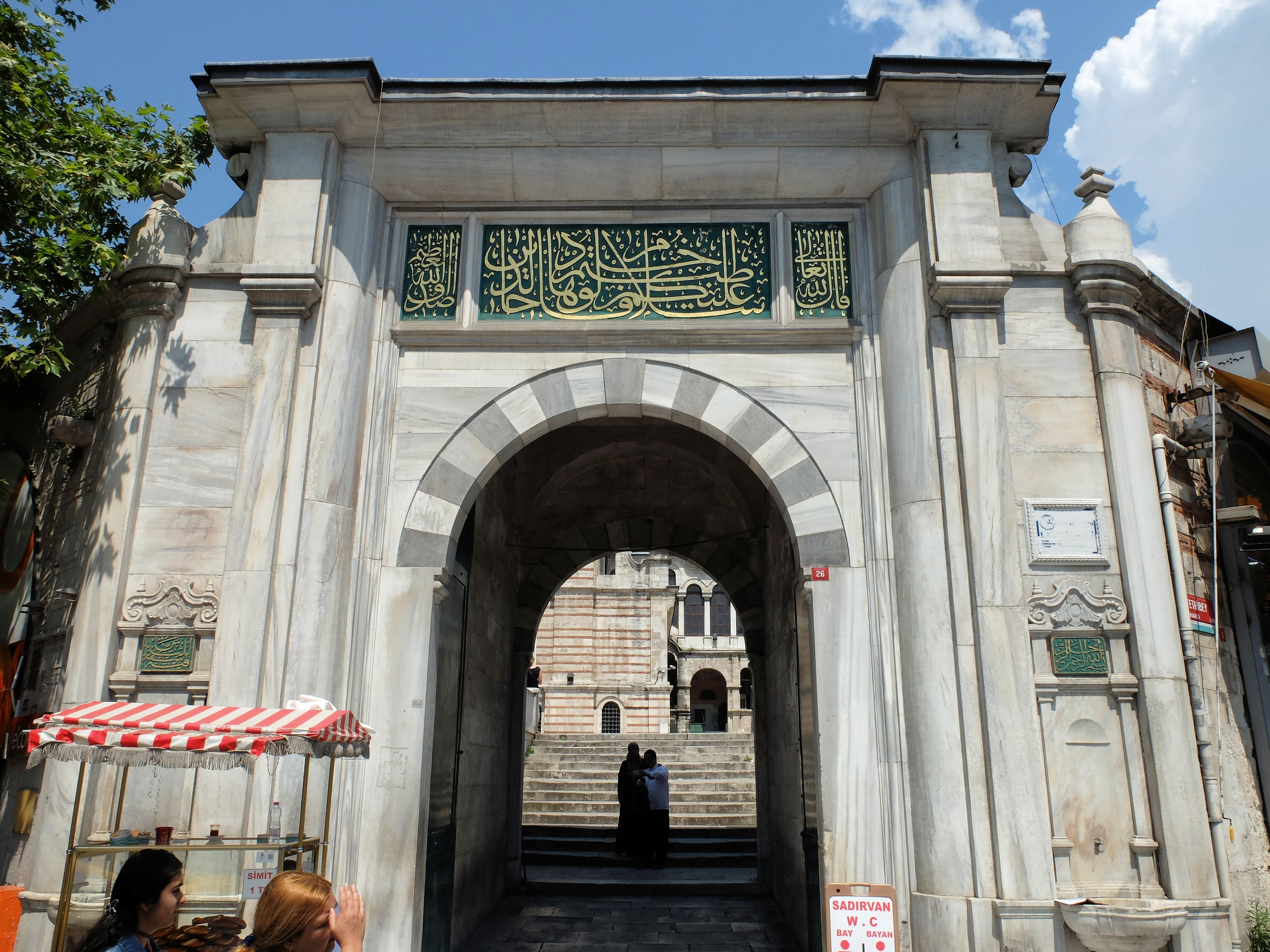
Southeast entrance to the mosque precinct

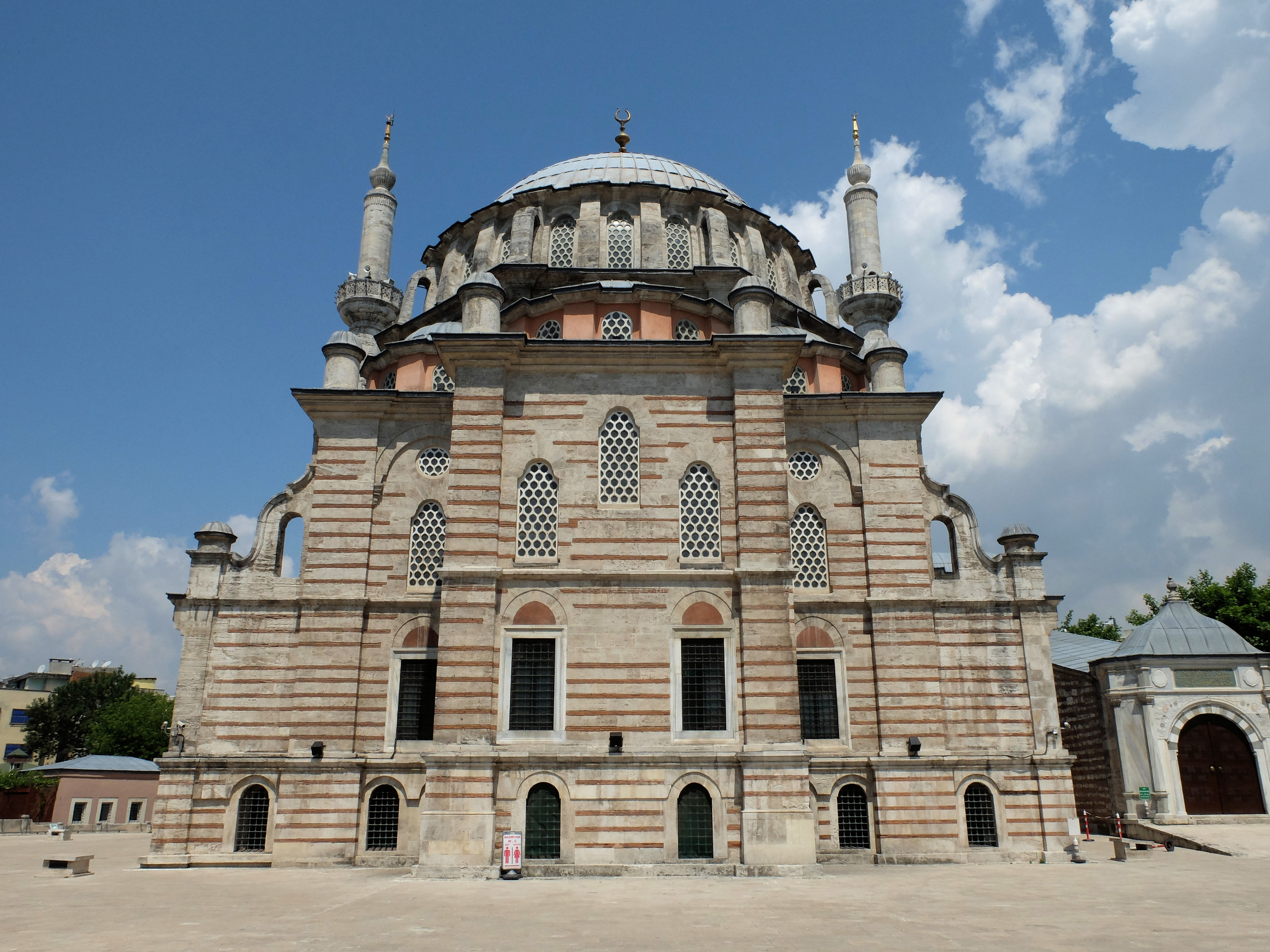
Rear view of the mosque, behind the qibla wall (southeast side)

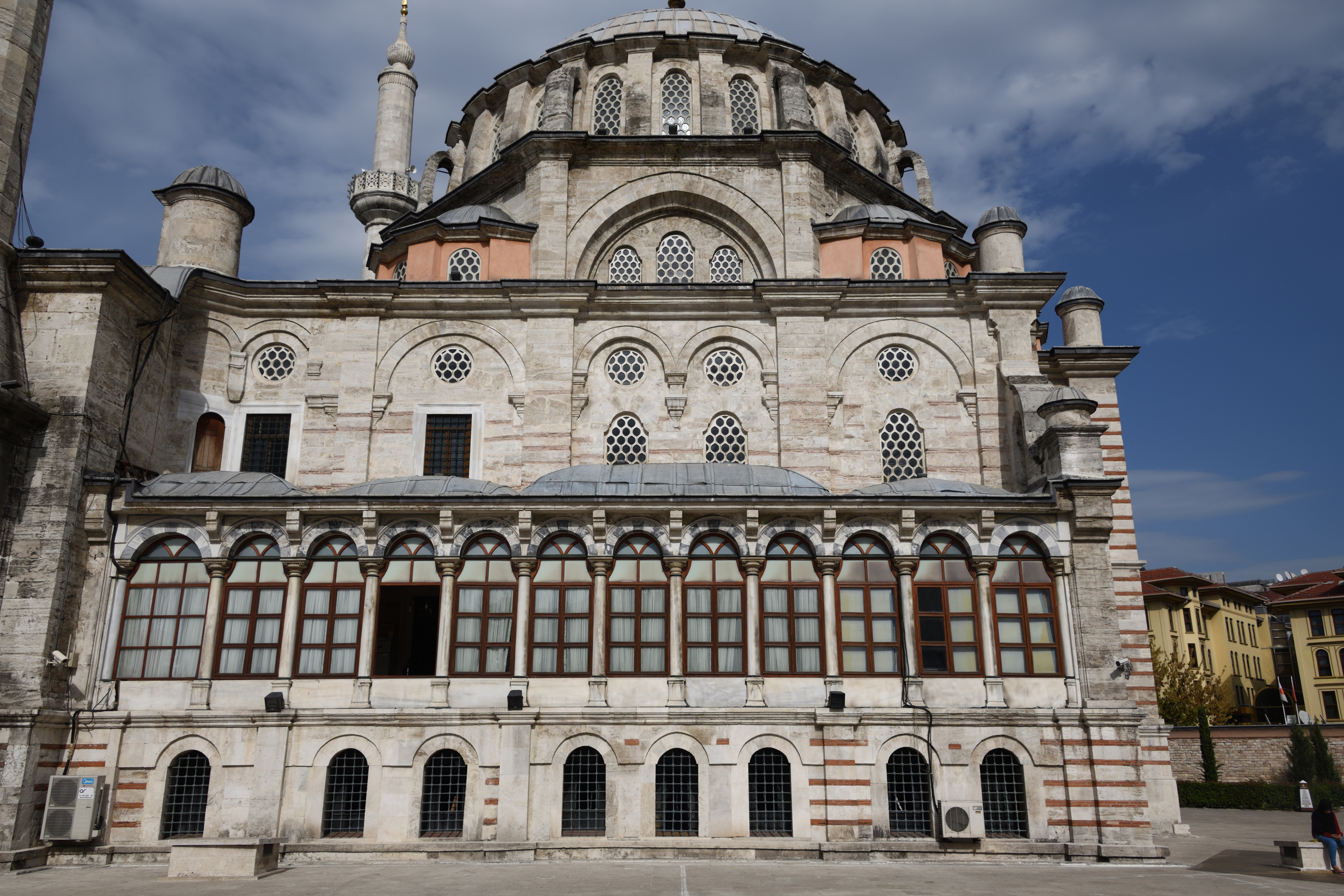
Side view of the mosque (southwest side)

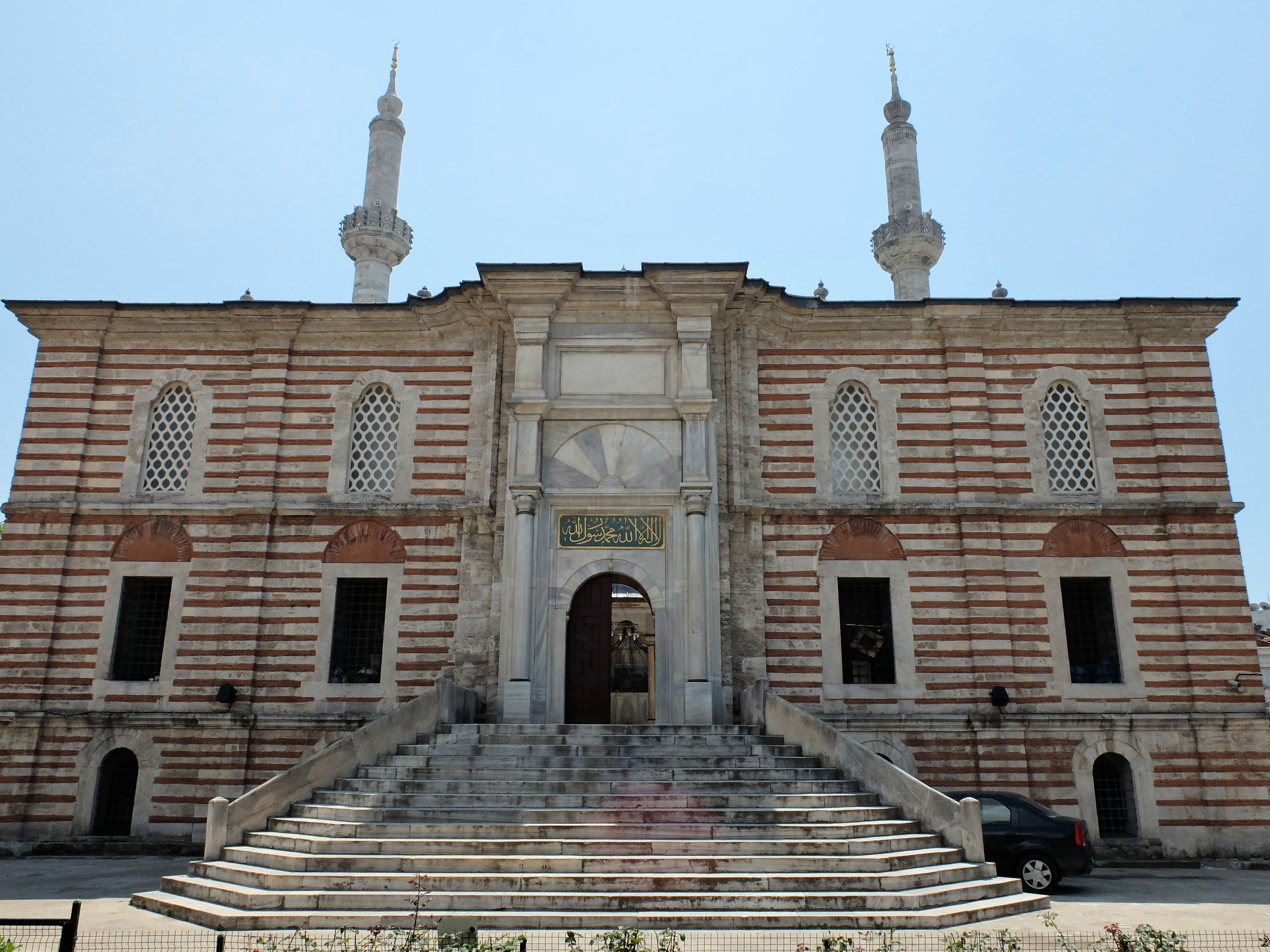
Front view of the mosque (northwest side), with central gate leading to the courtyard

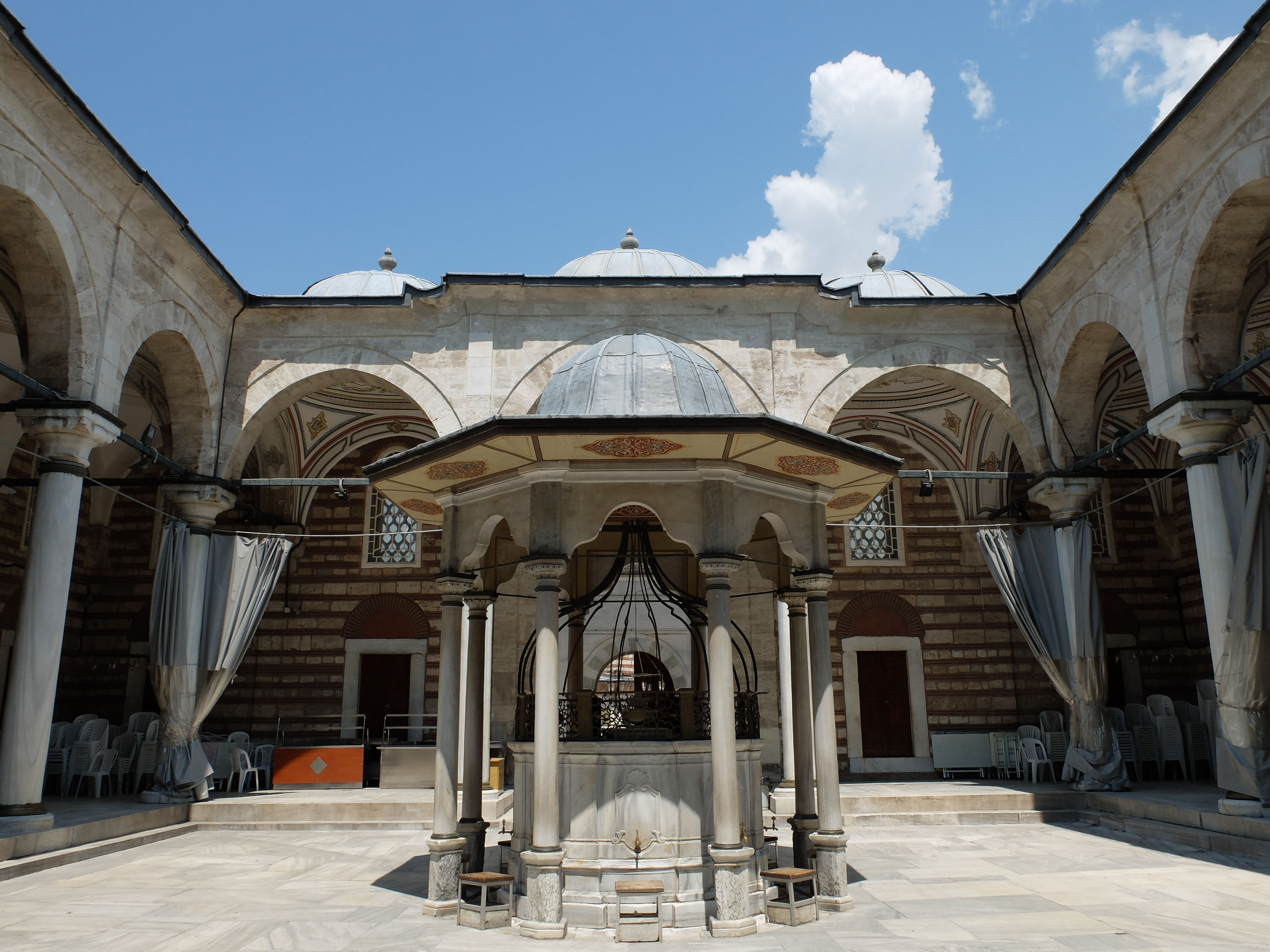
The courtyard (looking northwest towards the central gate)

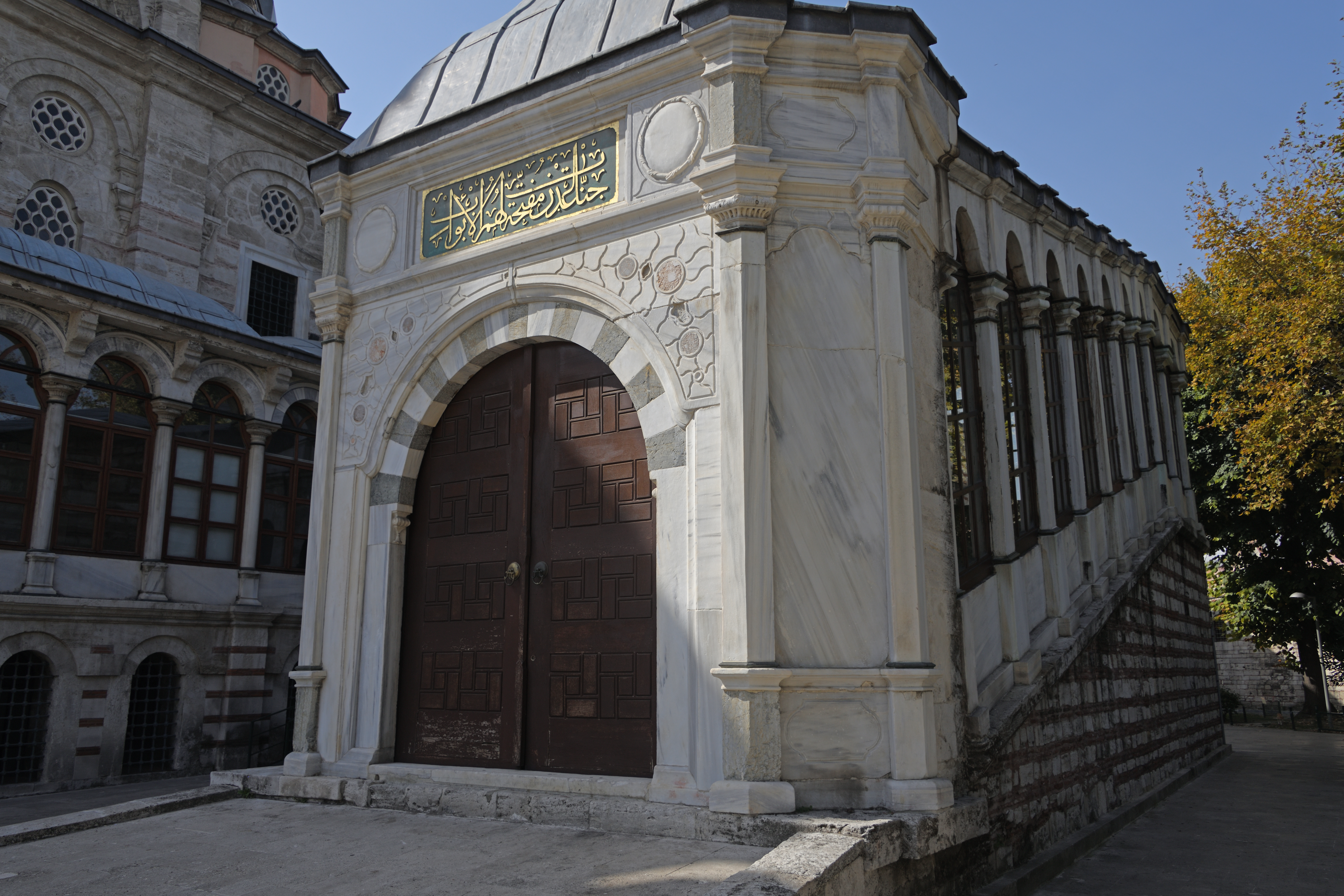
The ramp leading to the sultan's private entrance

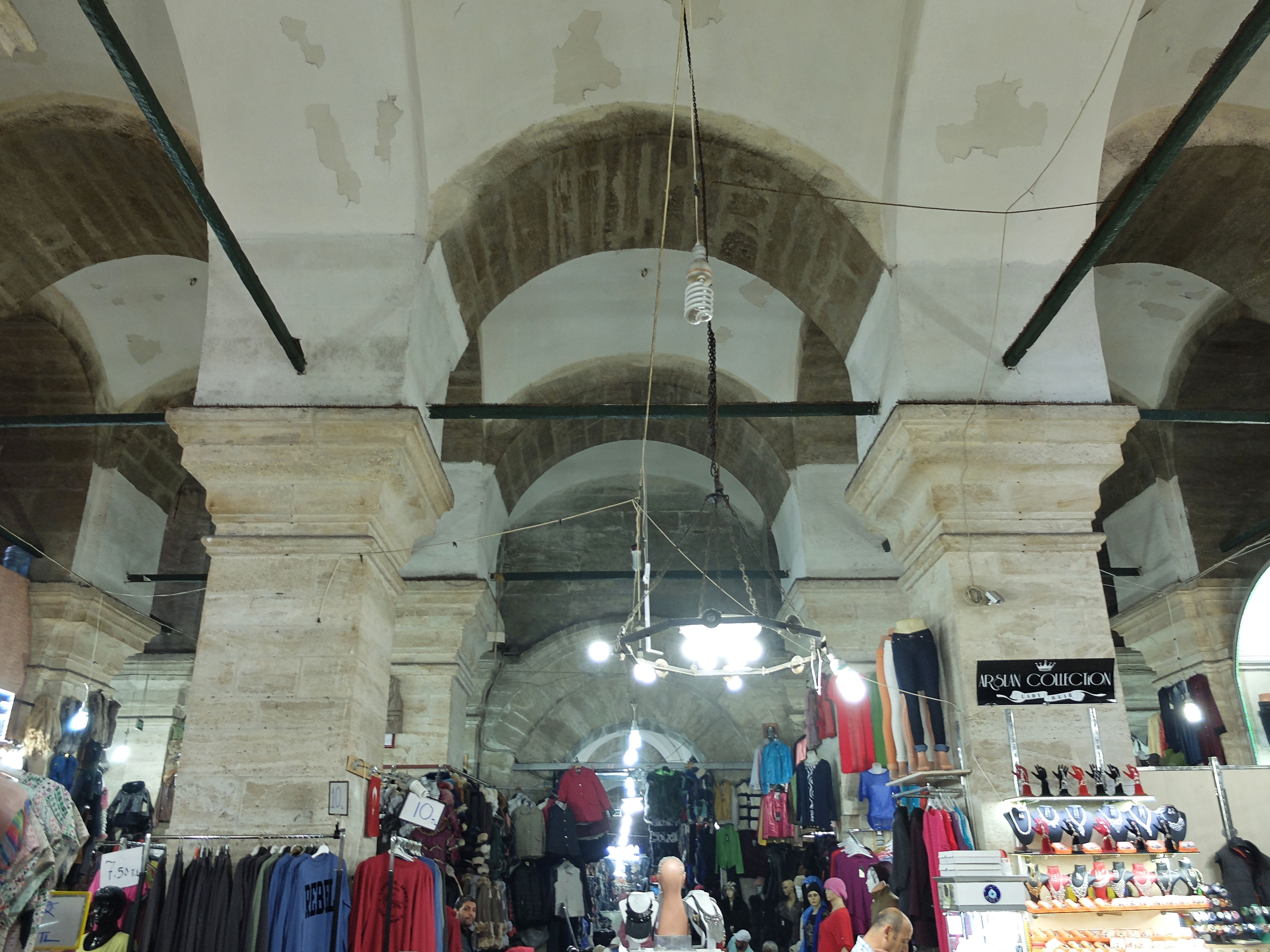
The substructure beneath the mosque, occupied by shops

=== Interior ===
The Laleli Mosque is an octagon inscribed within a rectangle, with a gallery on its western end. The walls make use of colorful variegated marbles in red, blue, yellow and browns, further decorated with medallions in opus sectile using also semi-precious onyx and jaspers. The mihrab and minbar are likewise richly decorated with precious marbles. The interior is well lit, with numerous windows in combinations of white and stained glass.

The dome is 12.50 metres (41.0 feet) in diameter and 24.50 metres (80.4 feet) high on an octagonal drum of eight arches, with semi-domes at the corner arches and larger semi-domes joining the arches above the mihrab and the central bay of the narthex.

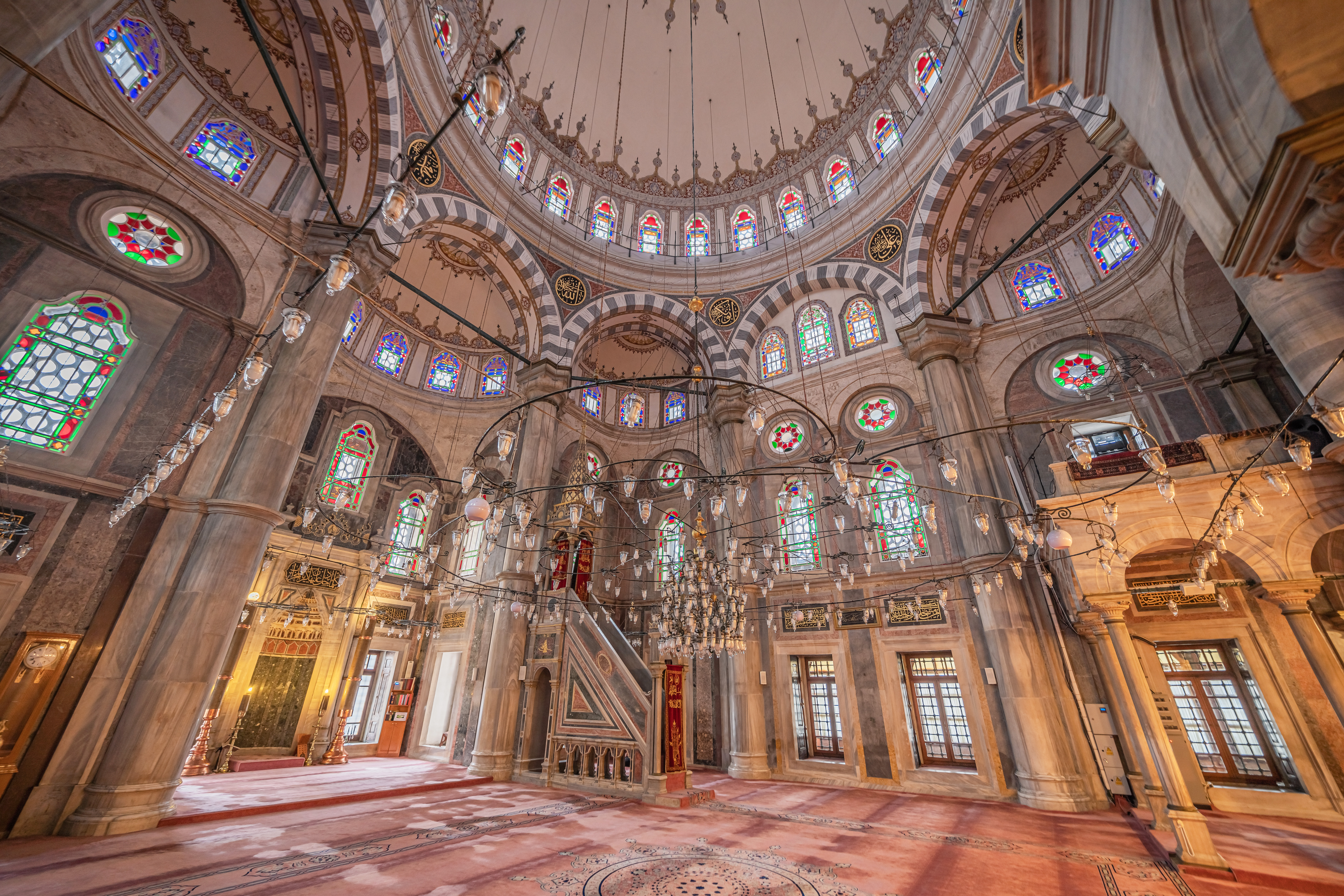
Interior of the prayer hall

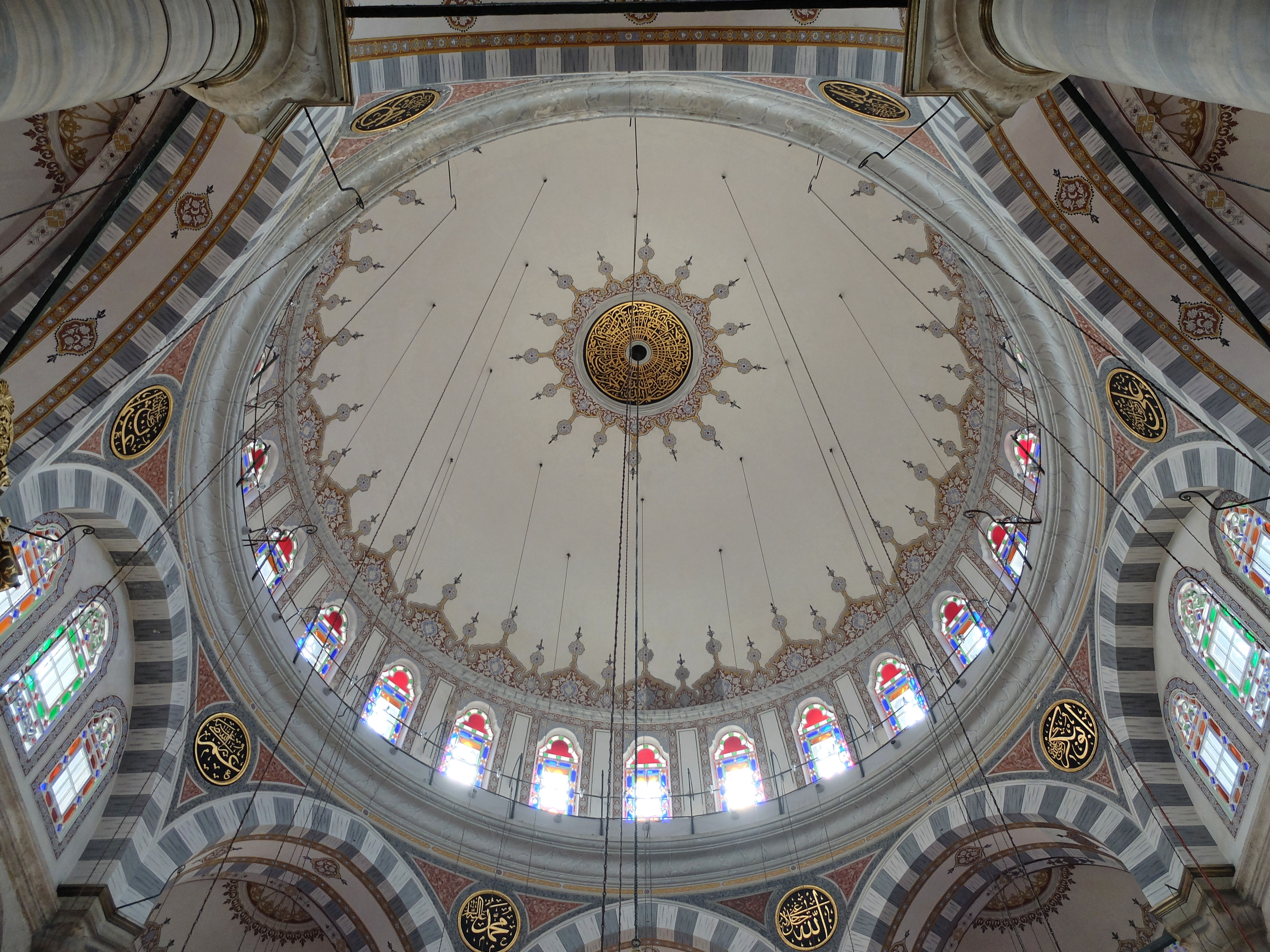
Interior of the dome

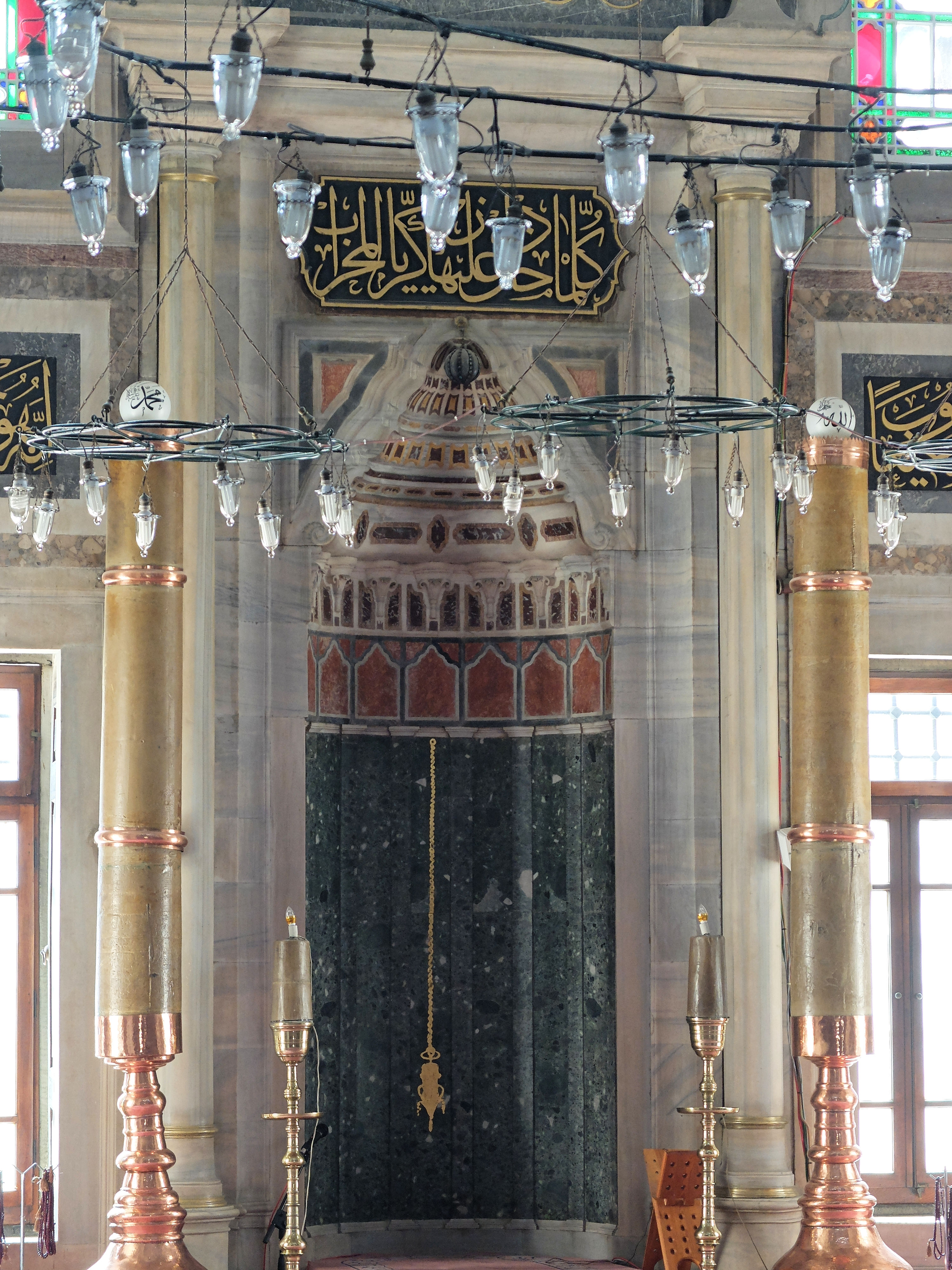
The mihrab

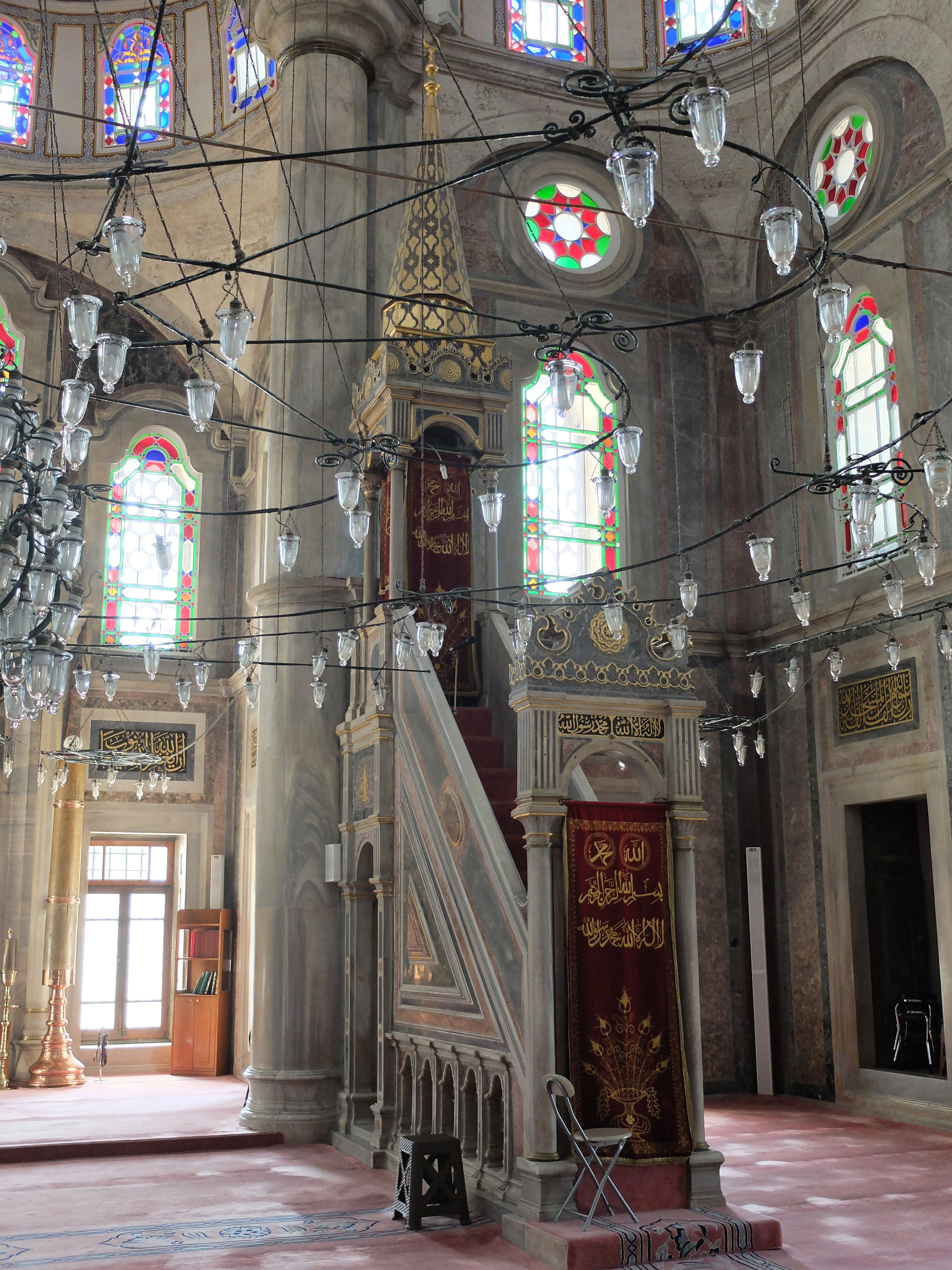
The minbar

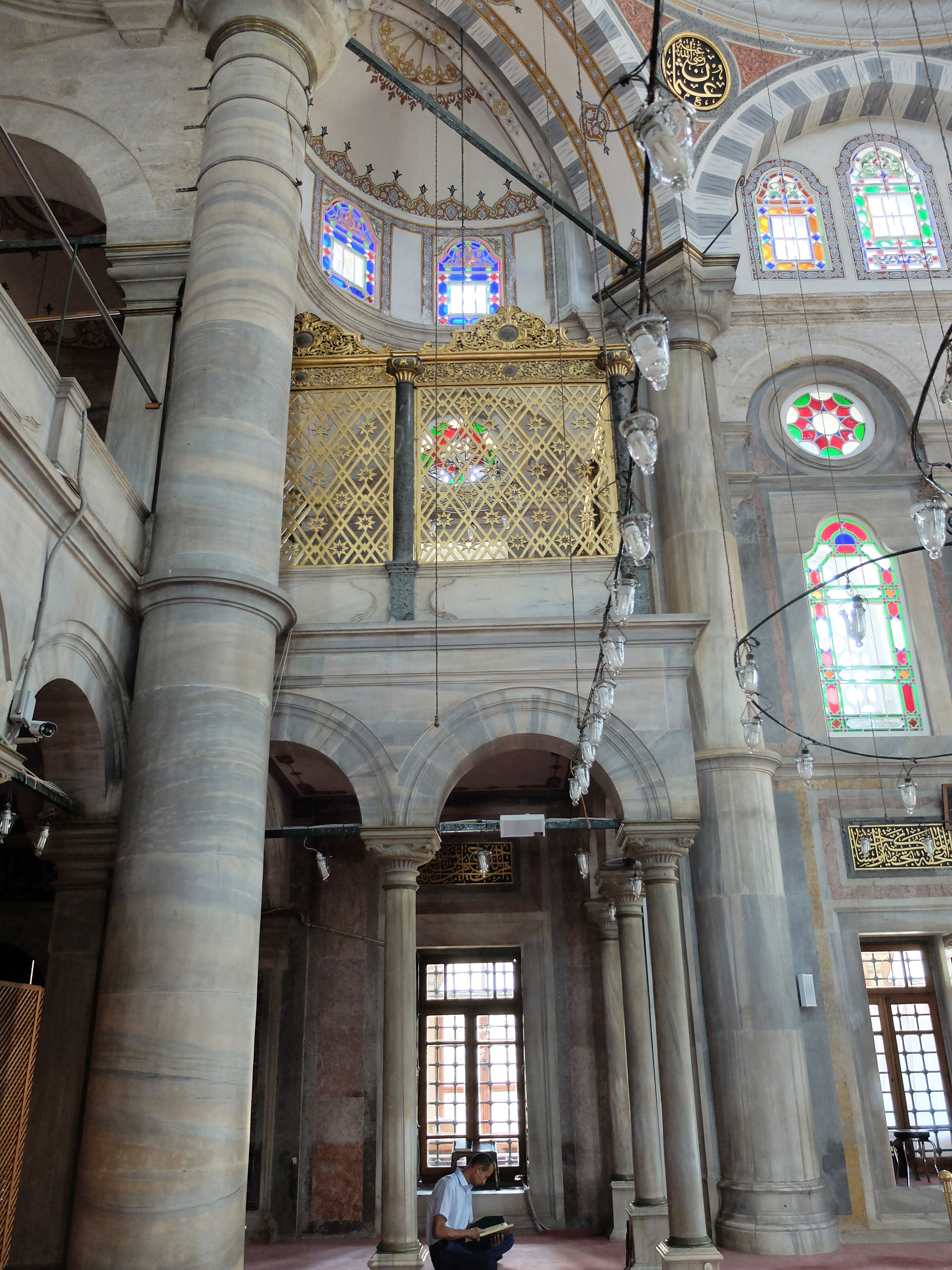
The sultan's loge

== Complex ==
Some of the structures of the Laleli Mosque's kulliye have disappeared over the years, but the mausoleum facing Ordu Street remains. It is an octagonal domed türbe and contains the graves of Mustafa III, his son and successor Selim III, and his daughters Hibetullah and Fatma Sultan and Mihrimah Sultan. The interior is decorated with reused İznik tiles from the 16th century, and a band of calligraphy encircles the upper walls. In the graveyard next to the türbe is the tomb of Adilşah Kadın, set within an ornate bronze grille representative of Ottoman metalwork at the time.

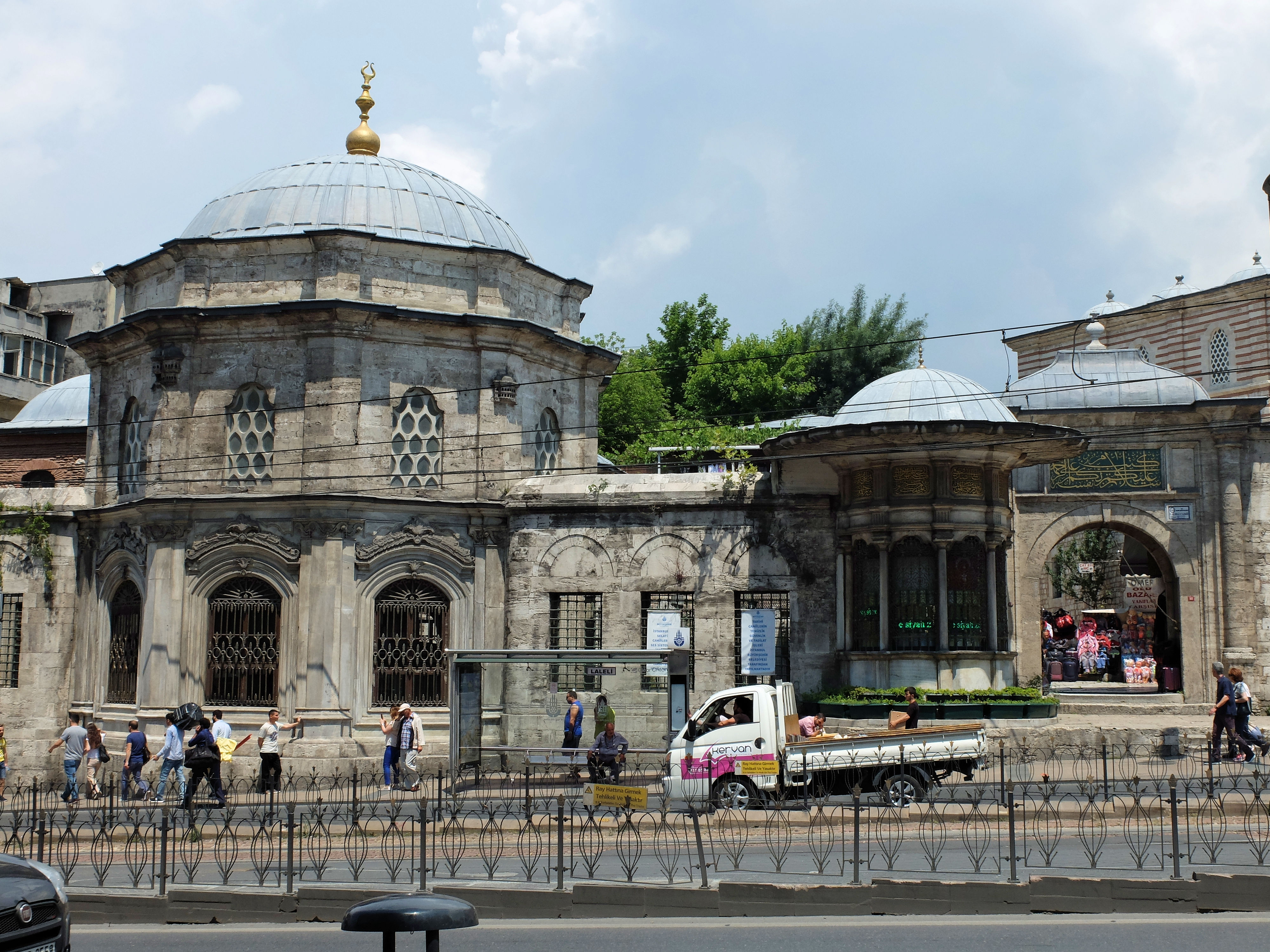
View of the mausoleum (left) and the sebil (right) from Ordu Street

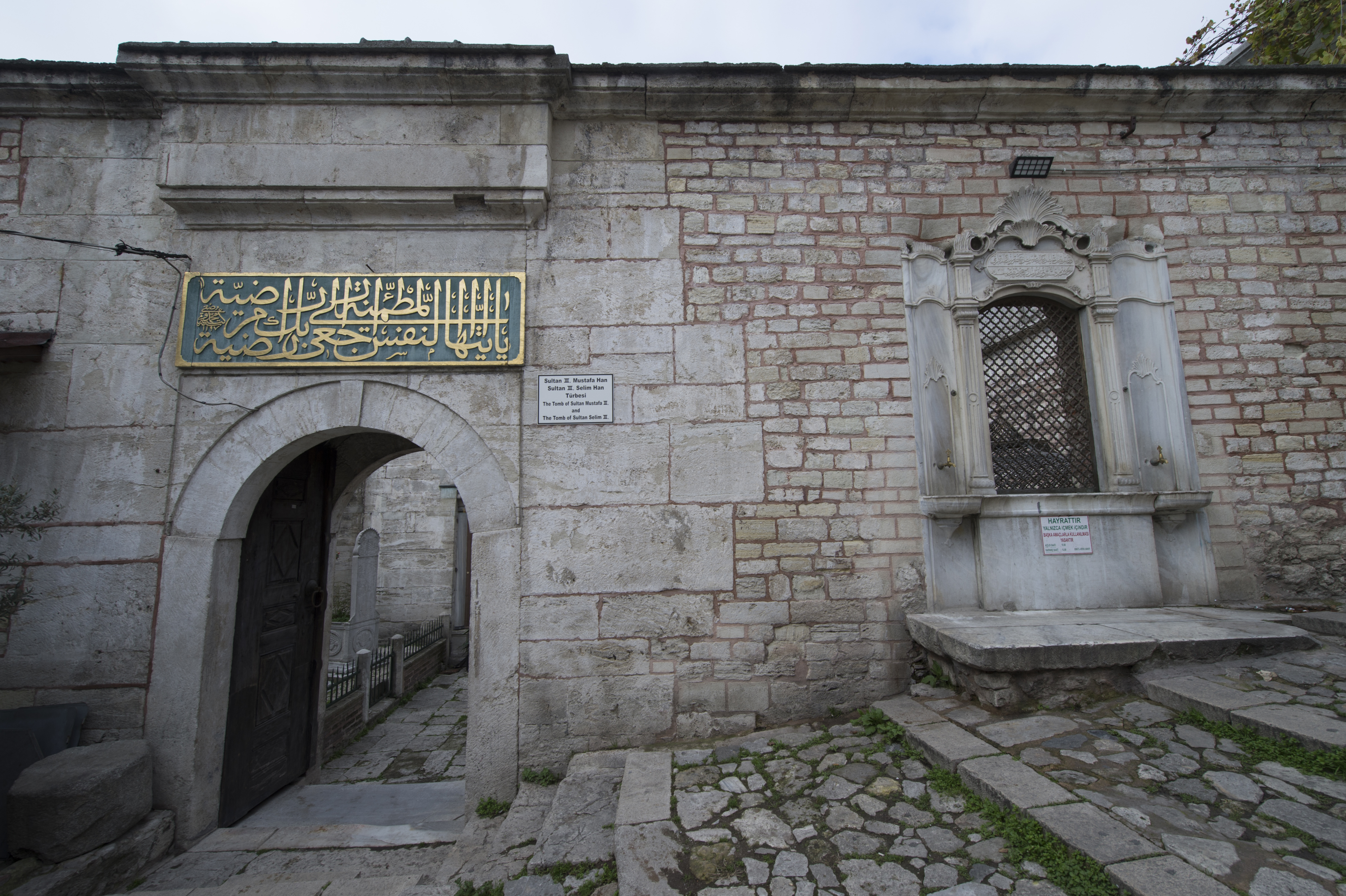
Entrance to the cemetery from inside the complex

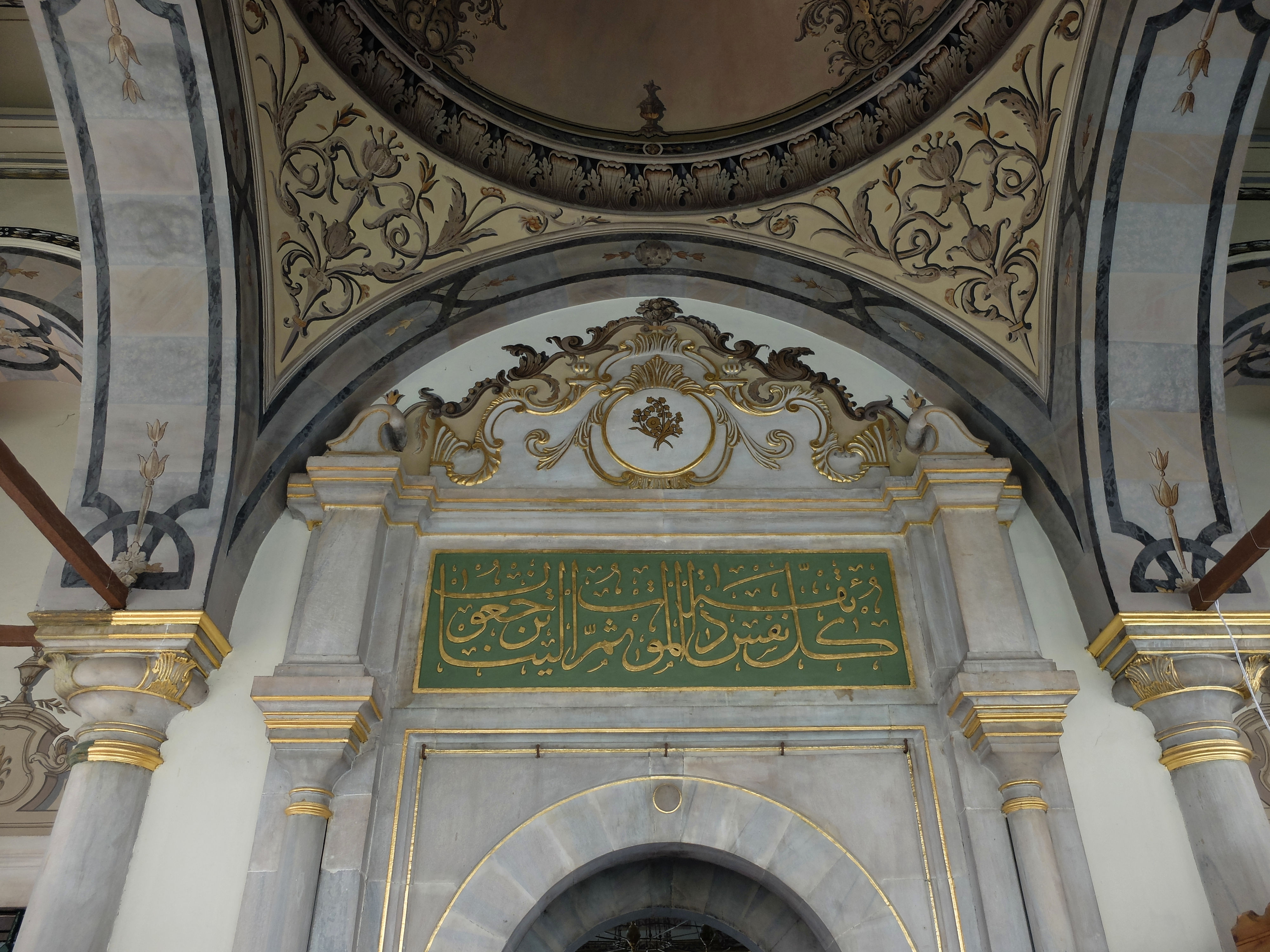
Entrance portal of the mausoleum

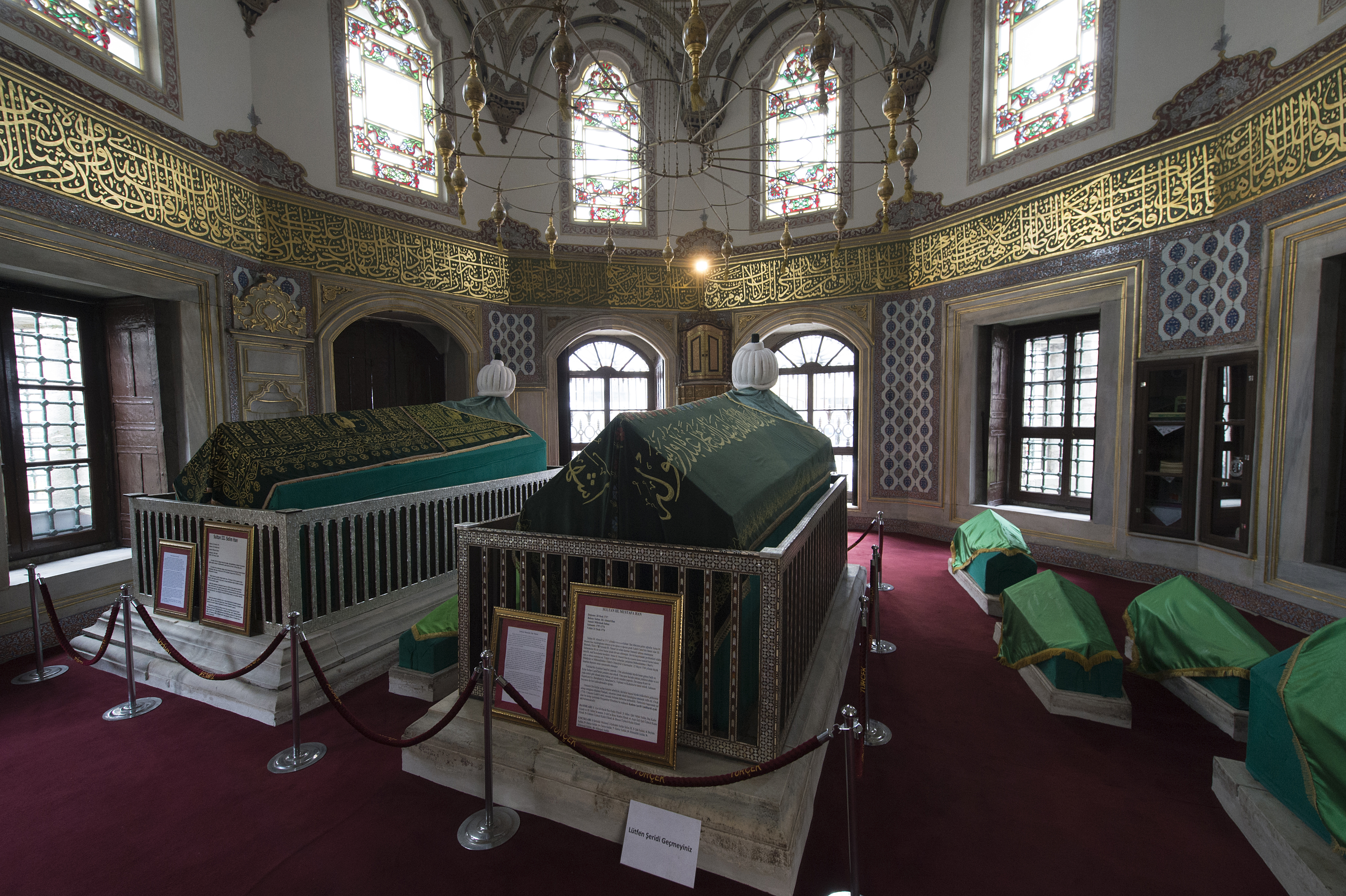
Interior of the mausoleum, with cenotaph of Mustafa III (center) and cenotaph of Selim III (left)

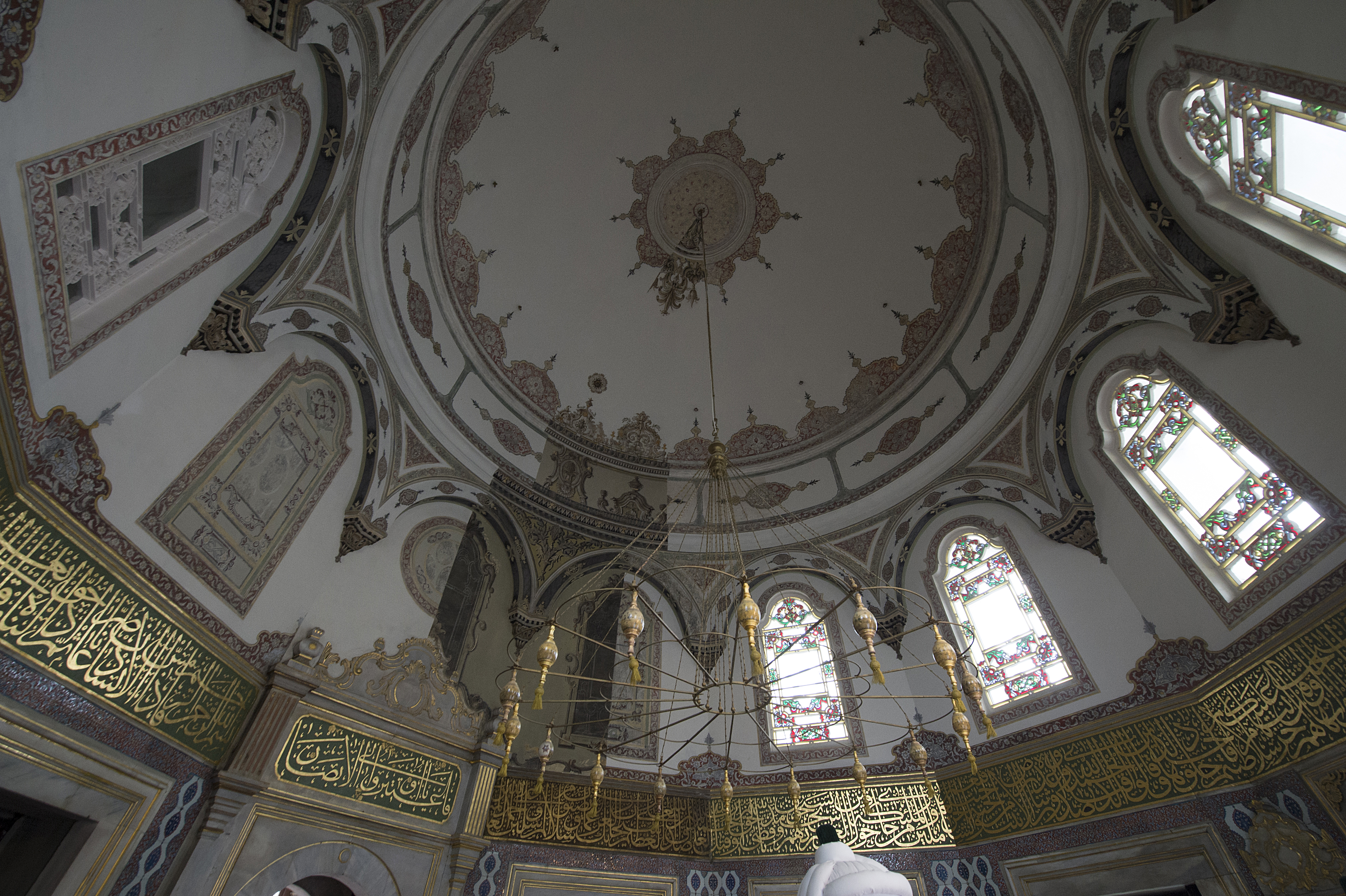
Interior of the mausoleum and its dome

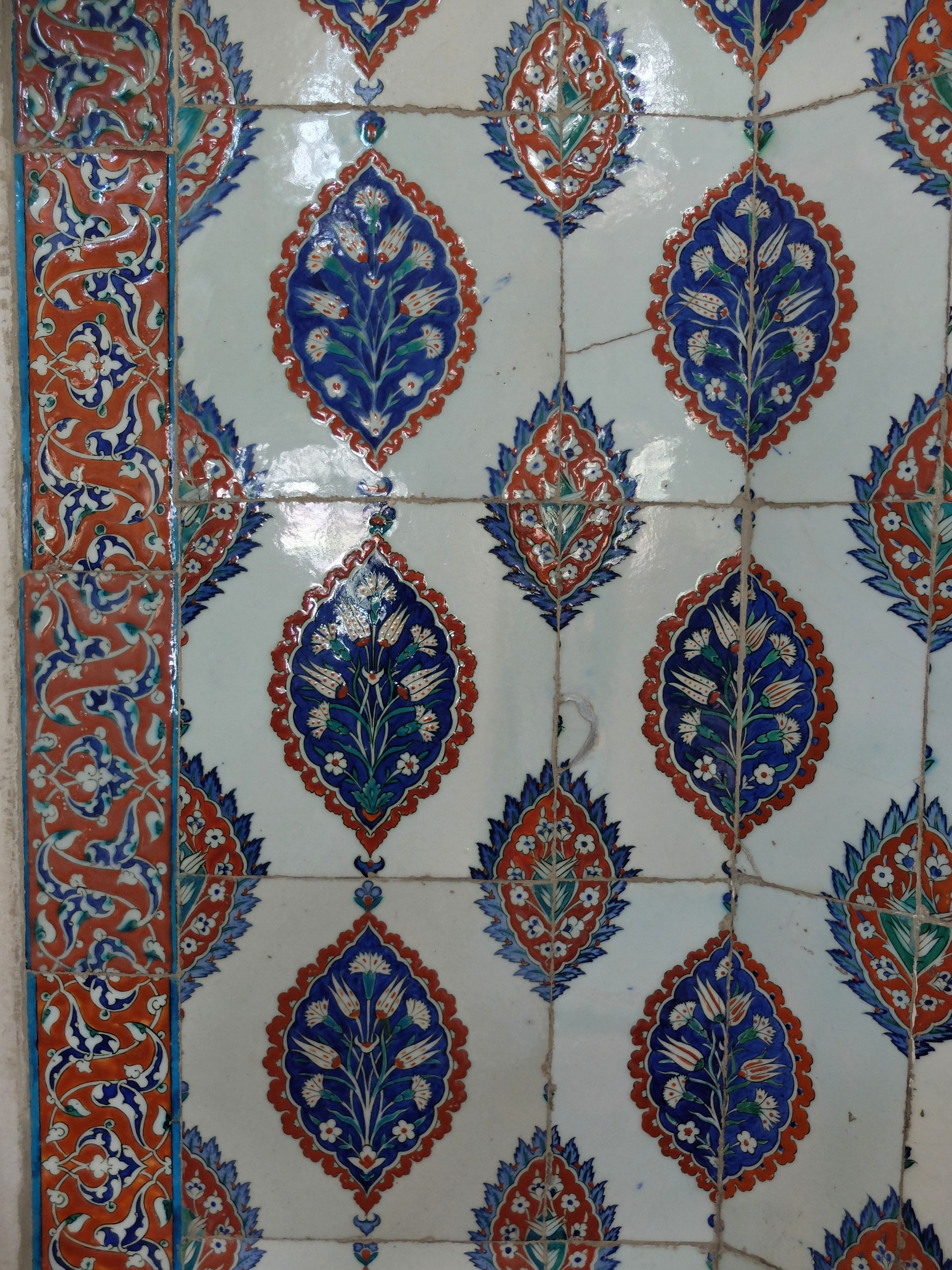
Detail of Iznik tile decoration inside the mausoleum

The waqf (endowment) of the complex also included a number of buildings throughout the city which provided revenues for the upkeep of the mosque and its külliye. Among the notable inclusions were two caravanserais: the nearby Taş Han (formerly known as the Çukurçeşme Han) and the larger Büyük Yeni Han located in the commercial district north of the Grand Bazaar.

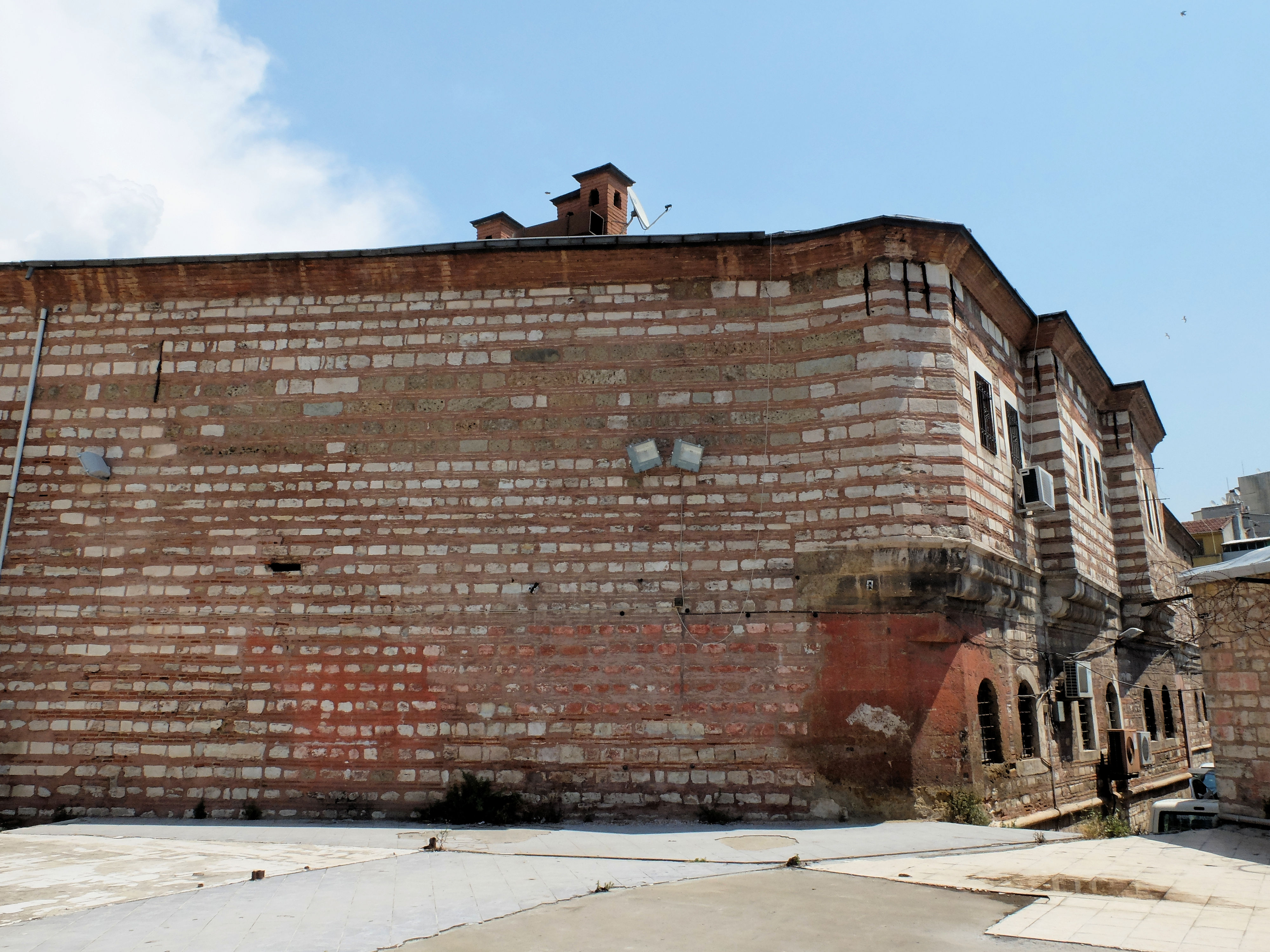
Exterior of the Taş Han

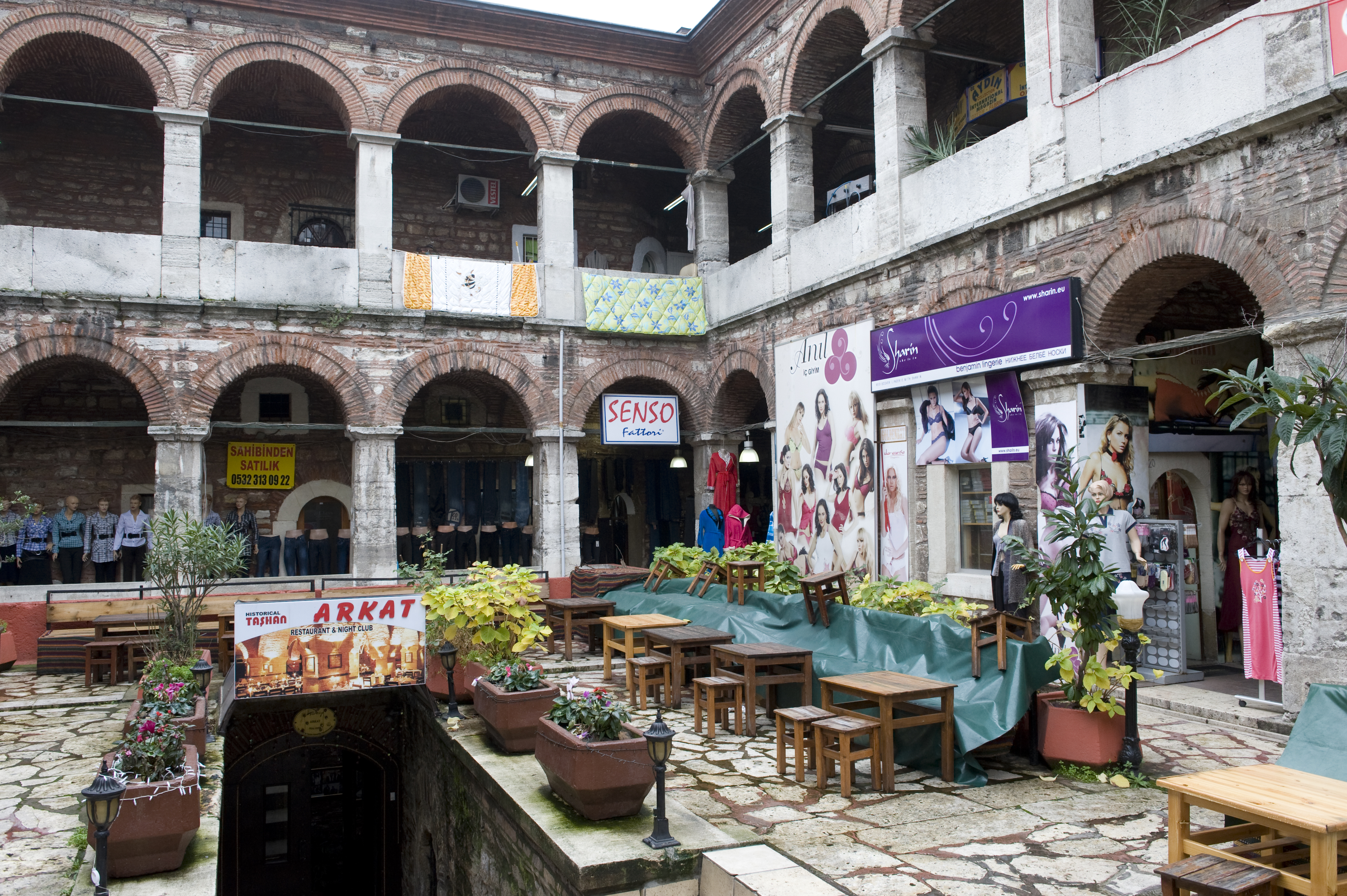
Interior of the Taş Han

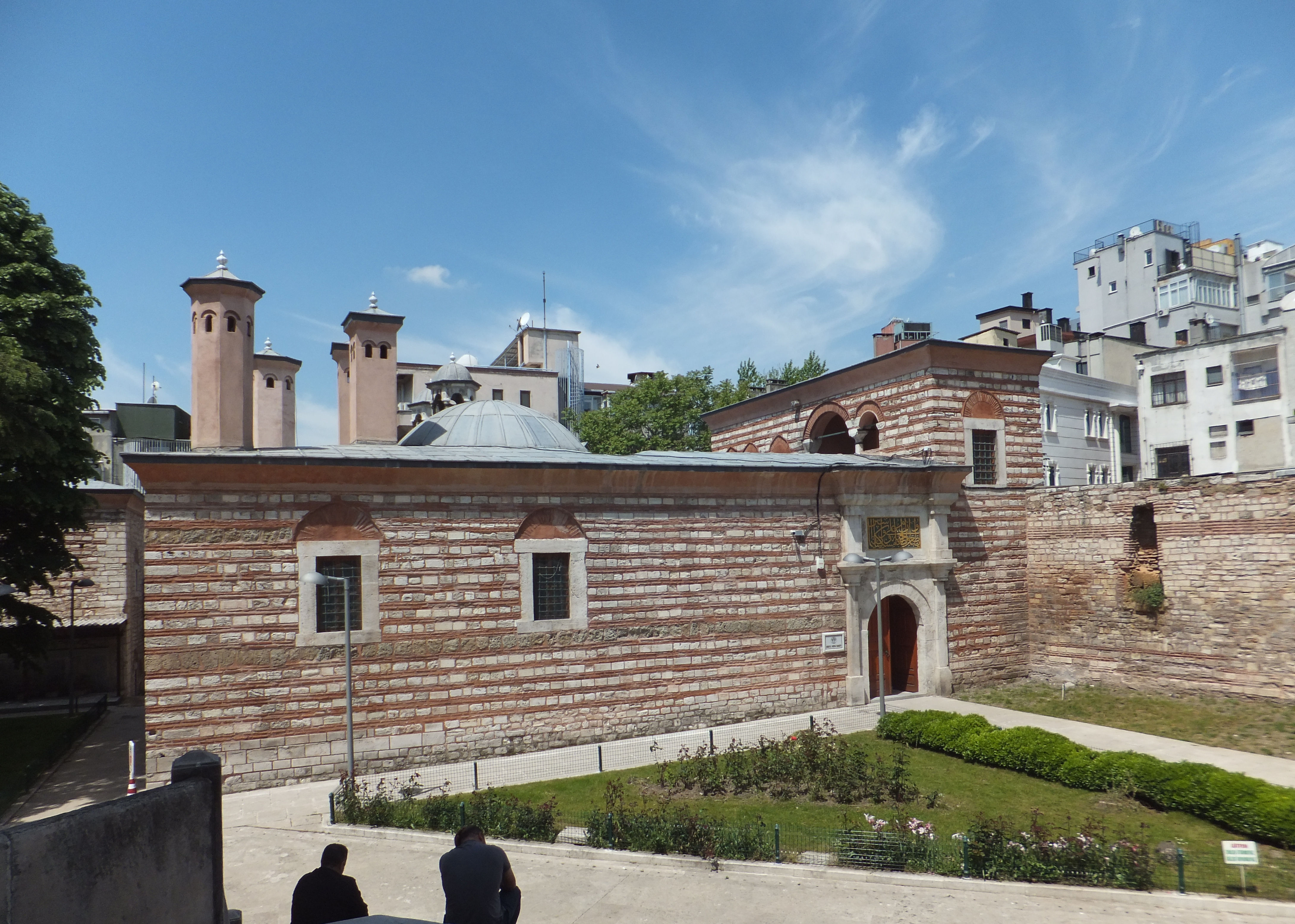
Imaret of the complex

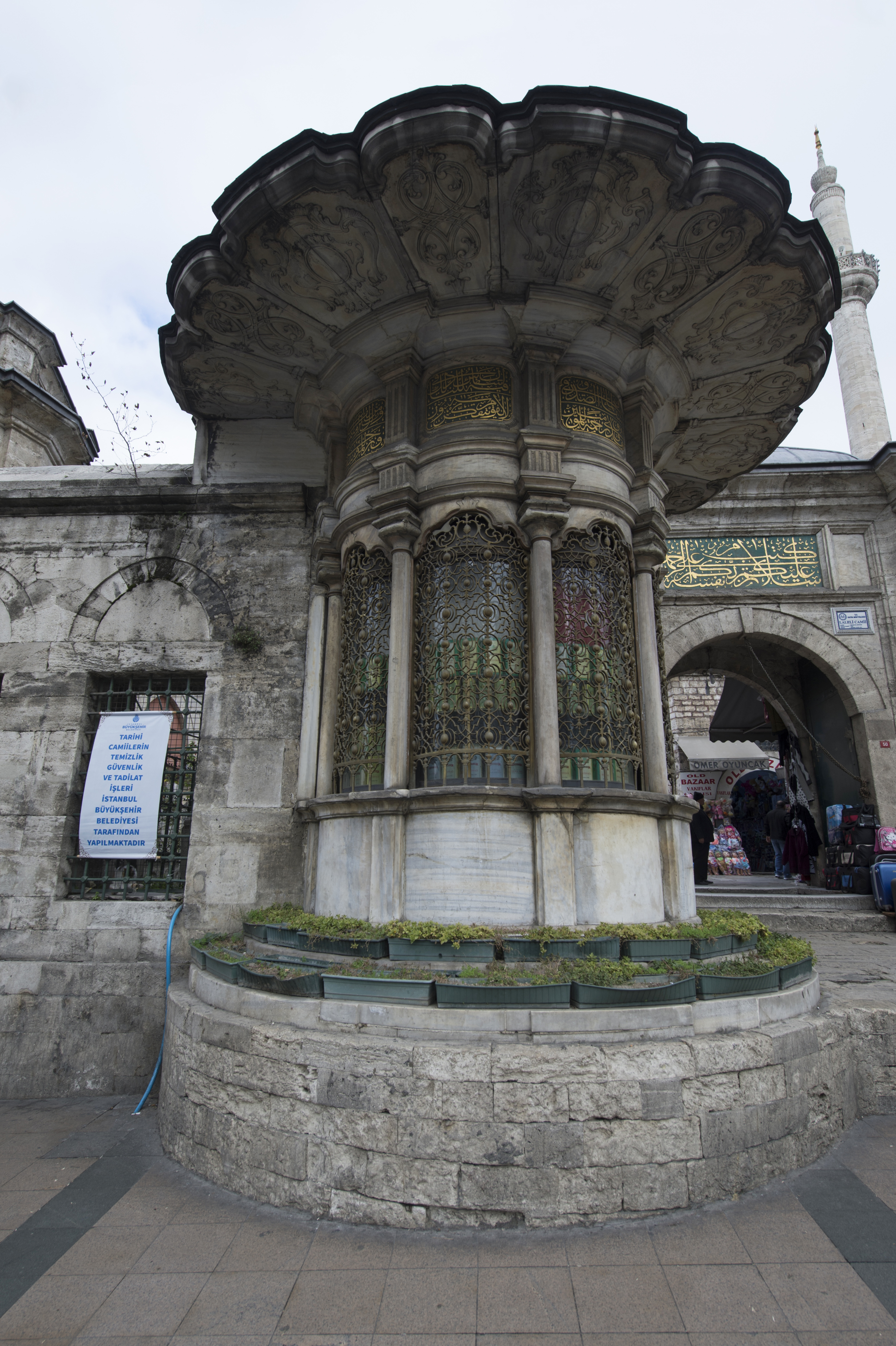
The sebil (on Ordu Street)

The Tayyare Apartments were built in 1922 next to the mosque on the ground of 1911 burnt down Koska Madrasa, which belonged to the mosque's complex. The buildings were redeveloped into a five-star hotel.
