= Bodrum Mosque =

Mosque in Istanbul, Turkey

Bodrum Mosque Bodrum Camii
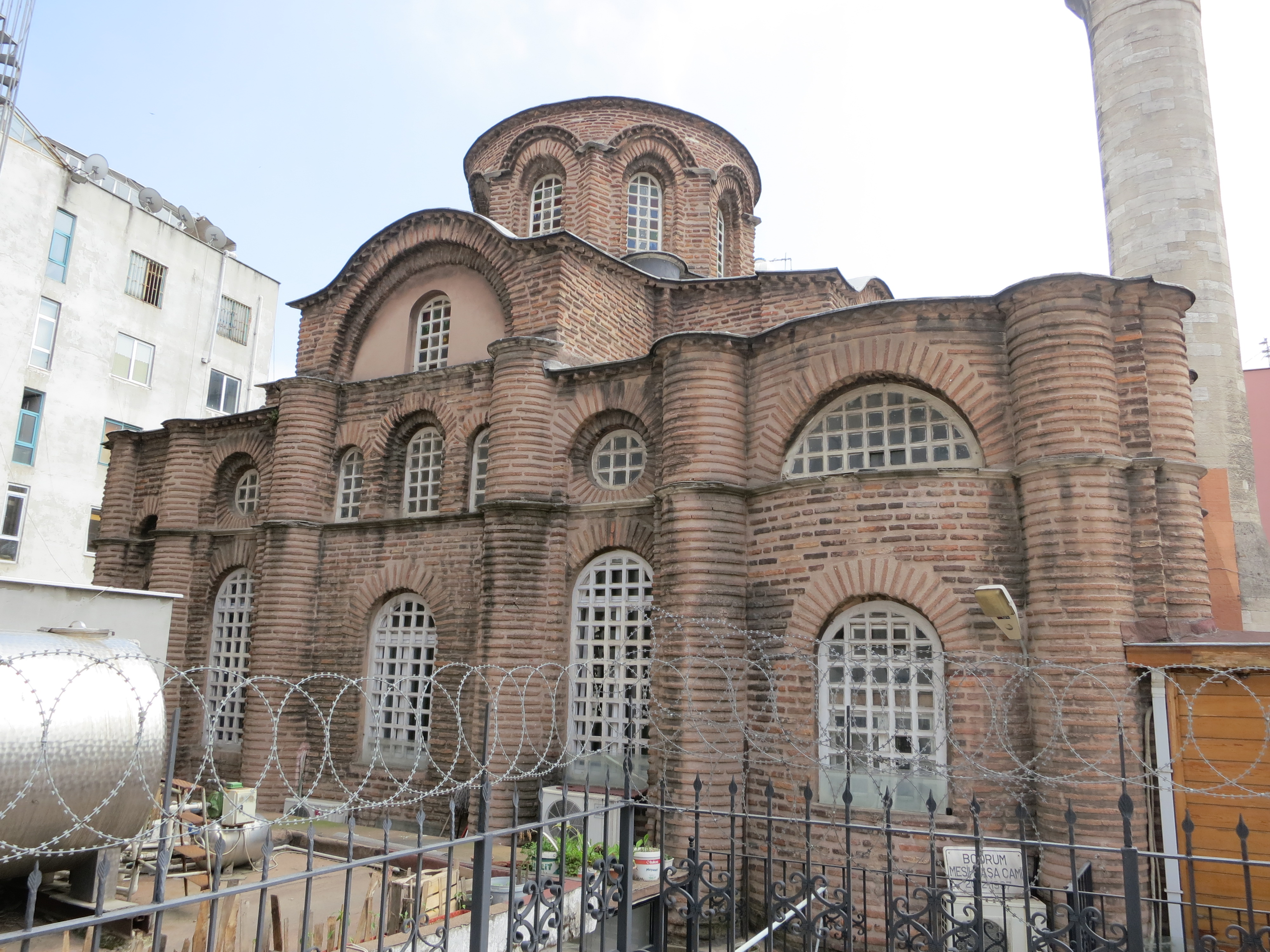
- The mosque viewed from northwest as of 2014

- Location in the Fatih district of Istanbul

Religion
- Affiliation: Sunni Islam

Location
- Location: Istanbul, Turkey
- Coordinates: 41°0′31″N 28°57′20″E

Architecture
- Type: church with cross-in-square plan
- Style: Byzantine
- Completed: 10th century

Specifications
- Minaret: 1
- Materials: Brick

Bodrum Mosque (Turkish: Bodrum Camii, or Mesih Paşa Camii named after its converter) in Istanbul, Turkey, is a former Eastern Orthodox church converted into a mosque by the Ottomans. The church was known under the Greek name of Myrelaion (Greek: Eκκλησία του Μυρελαίου).

== Location ==
The beautiful Byzantine structure is today rather incongruously choked on three sides by modern apartment blocks. It stands in Istanbul, in the district of Fatih, in the neighbourhood of Laleli, one kilometre west of the ruins of the Great Palace of Constantinople.

== History ==
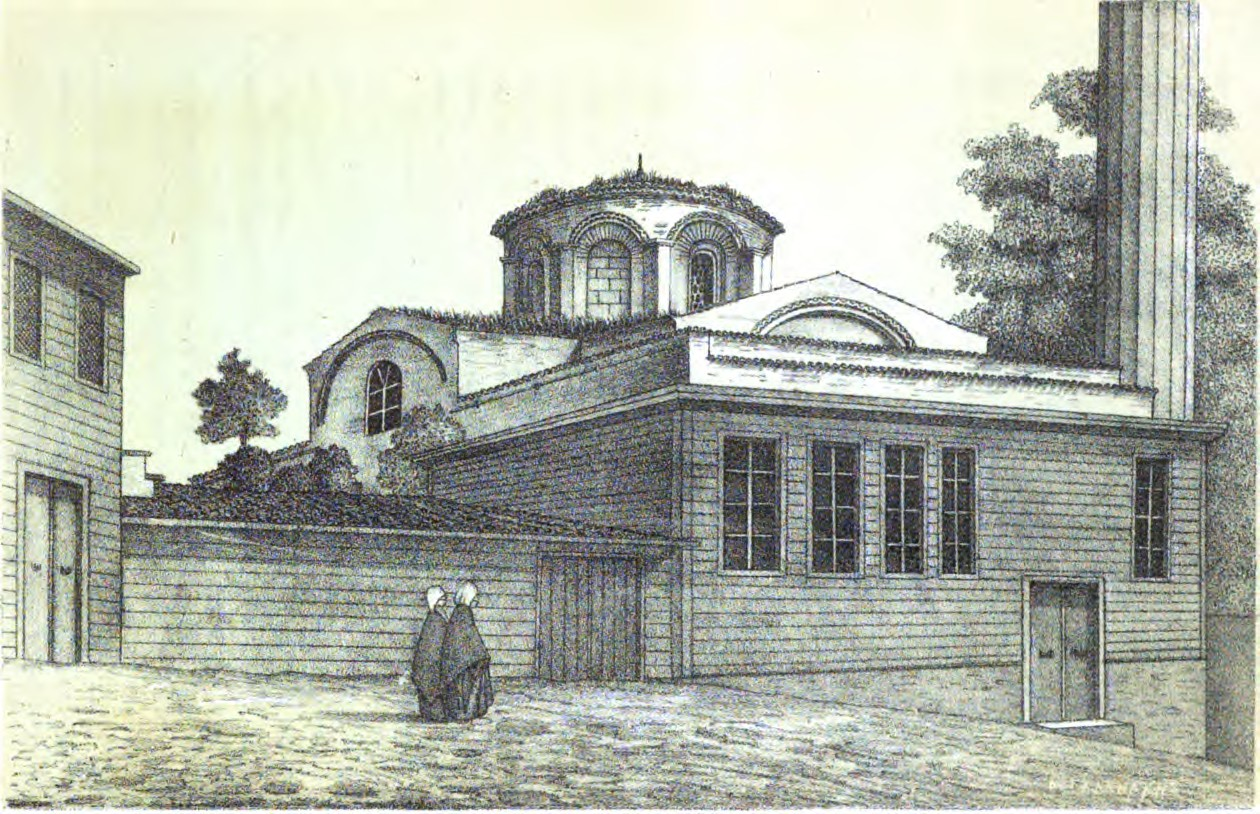
The mosque in 1877

Some years before 922, possibly during the wars against Simeon I's Bulgaria, the droungarios Romanos Lekapenos bought a house in the ninth region of Constantinople, not far from the Sea of Marmara, in the place called Myrelaion ("the place of myrrh" in Greek). After his accession to the throne this building became the nucleus of a new imperial palace, intended to challenge the neighbouring Great Palace of Constantinople, and the family shrine of the Lekapenos family.

The palace of Myrelaion was built on top of a giant fifth century rotunda which, with an external diameter of 41.8 metres (137.1 feet), was the second largest, after the Roman Pantheon, in the ancient world. In the tenth century the rotunda was not used anymore, and then it was converted – possibly by Romanos himself – into a cistern by covering its interior with a vaulted system carried by at least 70 columns. Near the palace the Emperor built a church, which he intended from the beginning to use as burial place for his family.

The first person to be buried there was his wife Theodora, in December 922, followed by his eldest son and co-emperor Christopher, who died in 931. By doing so, Romanos interrupted a six-century-old tradition, whereby almost all the Byzantine emperors since Constantine I were buried in the Church of the Holy Apostles.

Later the Emperor converted his palace into a nunnery and, after his deposition and death in exile as monk in the island of Prote in June 948, he too was buried in the church.

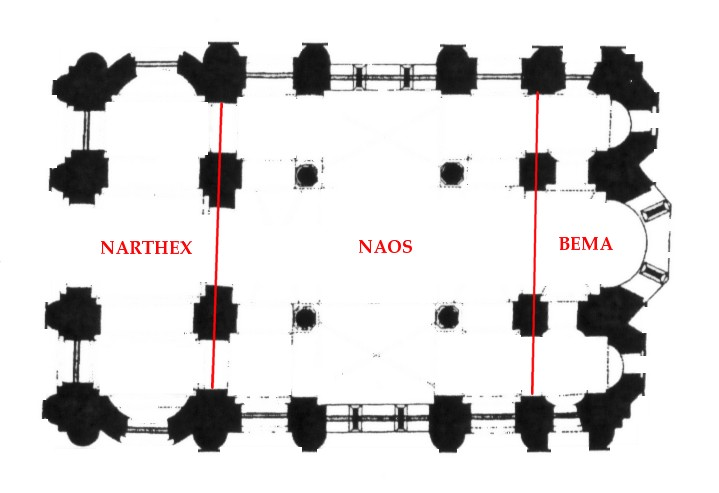
Plan of the building, one of the first examples of a cross-in-square church.

The shrine was ravaged by fire in 1203, during the Fourth Crusade. Abandoned during the Latin occupation of Constantinople (1204–1261), the building was repaired at the end of the thirteenth century, during the period of the Palaiologan restoration.

After the Ottoman conquest of Constantinople in 1453, the Myrelaion was converted into a mosque by Grand Vizier Mesih Paşa around the year 1500, during the reign of Bayezid II. The mosque was named after its substructure (the meaning of the Turkish word bodrum is "subterranean vault", "basement"), but was also known under the name of its founder. The edifice was damaged again by fires in 1784 and 1911, when it was abandoned.

In 1930, an excavation led by David Talbot Rice discovered the round cistern. In 1964–1965, a radical restoration led by the Archaeological Museum of Istanbul replaced almost all the external masonry of the edifice, and was then interrupted. In 1965, two parallel excavations led by art historian Cecil L. Striker and by R. Naumann focused respectively on the substructure and on the imperial palace. The building was finally restored in 1986 when it was reopened as mosque. In 1990, the cistern was restored too, and it has hosted a shopping mall for a few years. Now the cistern is used by the women to pray.

== Architecture ==
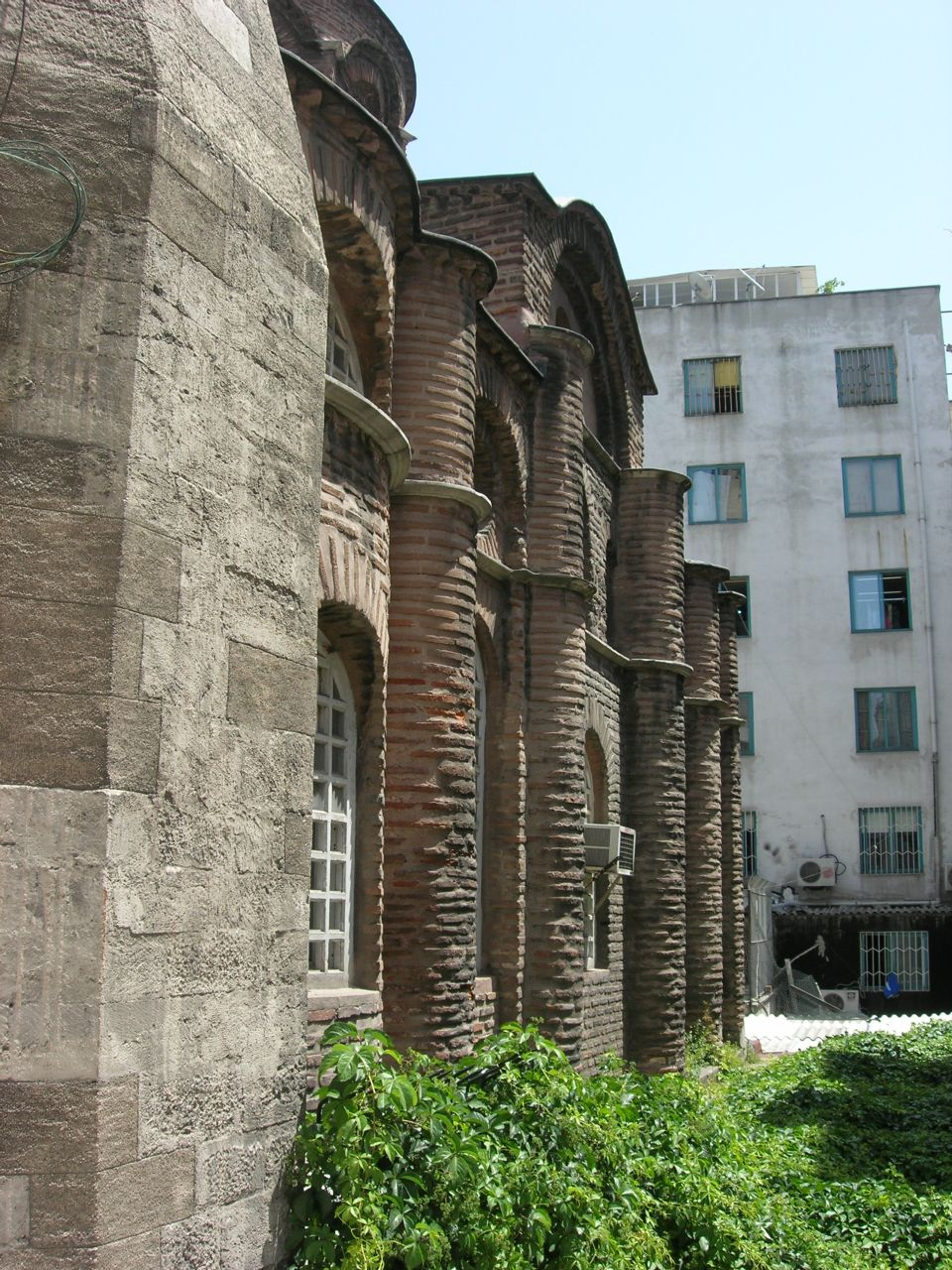
The south wall of the mosque. In the foreground the base of the minaret can be seen.

=== Building ===
The building, whose masonry consists entirely of bricks, is built on a foundation structure made of alternated courses of bricks and stone, and has a cross-in-square (or quincunx) plan, with a nine meter long side.

The central nave (naos) is surmounted by an umbrella dome, with a drum interrupted by arched windows, which gives to the structure an undulating rhythmus. The four side naves are covered by barrel vaults. The edifice has a narthex to the west and a sanctuary to the east. The central bay of the narthex is covered by a dome, the two side bays by cross vaults. The nave is partitioned by four piers, which substituted in the Ottoman period the original columns. Many openings – windows, oeil-de-boeufs and arches – give light to the structure.

The exterior of the building is characterized by the half cylindrical buttresses which articulate its façades. Originally an exonarthex existed too, but in the Ottoman period it was replaced by a wooden portico. The building has three polygonal apses. The central one belongs to the sanctuary (bema), while the lateral are parts of two clover-shaped side chapels (pastophoria), prothesis and diakonikon.

The Ottomans built a stone minaret close to the narthex. The building was originally decorated with a marble revetment and mosaics, which disappeared totally. As a whole, Bodrum mosque shows strong analogies with the north church of the Fenari Isa complex.

=== Substructure ===
The substructure, in contrast with the building, has an austere and rough aspect. Originally its purpose was only that of bringing the church to the same level of the palace of Lekapenos. After the restoration in the Palaiologan period it was used as burial chapel.

This edifice is the first example of a private burial church of a Byzantine emperor, starting so a tradition typical of the later Komnenian and Palaiologan periods. Moreover, the building represents a beautiful example of the cross-in-square type church, the new architectural type of the middle Byzantine architecture.

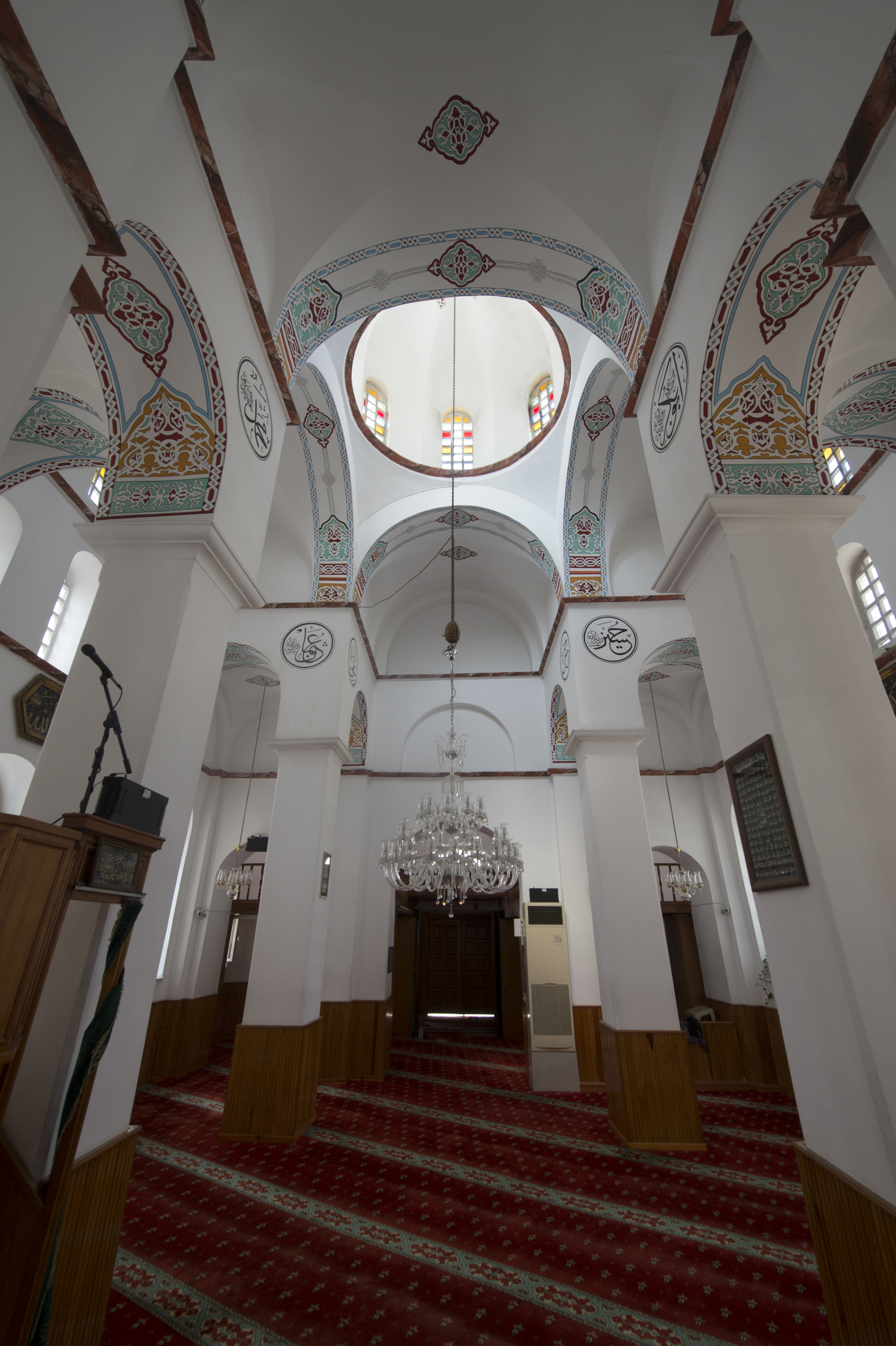
Bodrum Mosque interior

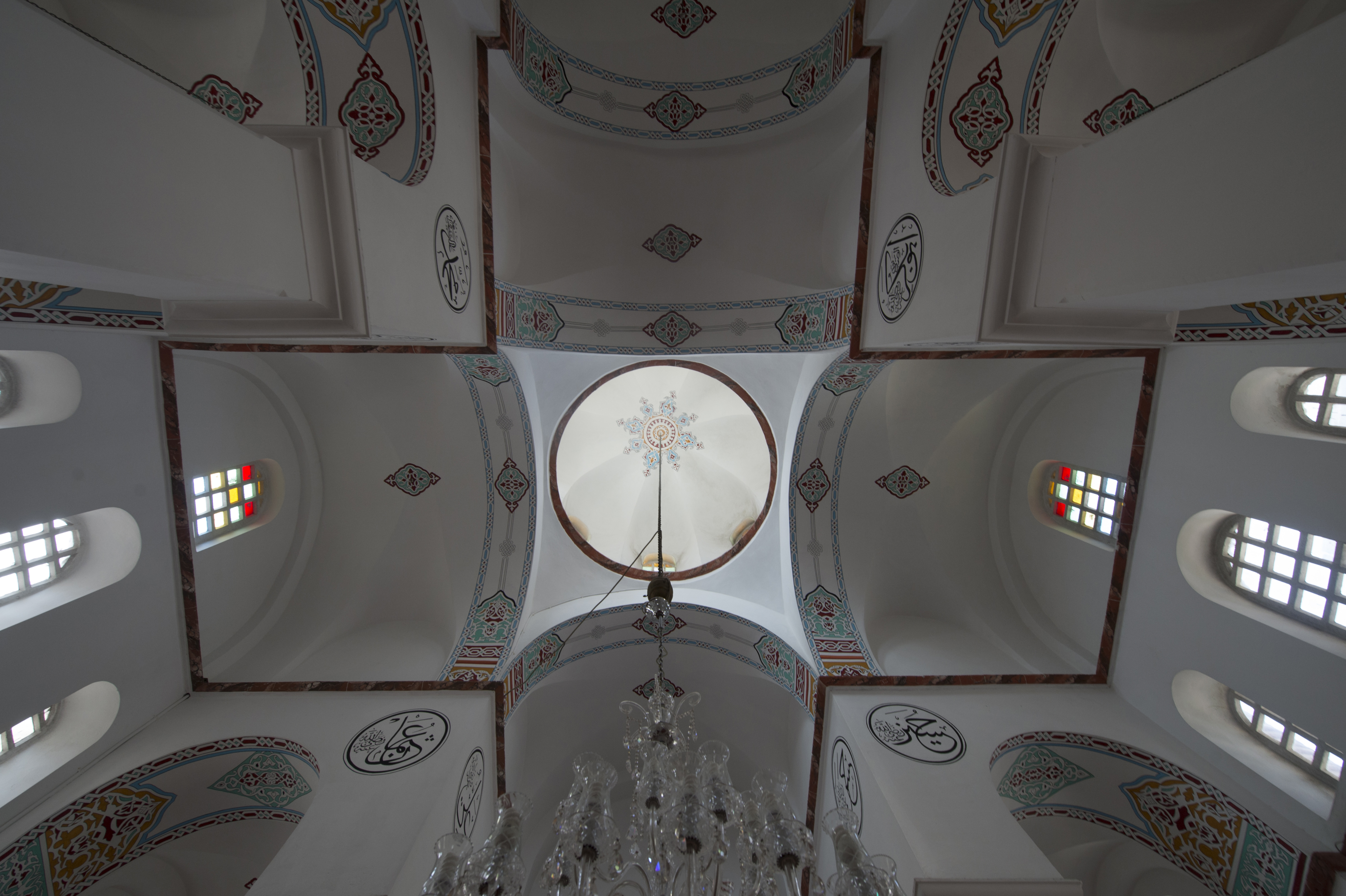
Bodrum Mosque ceiling

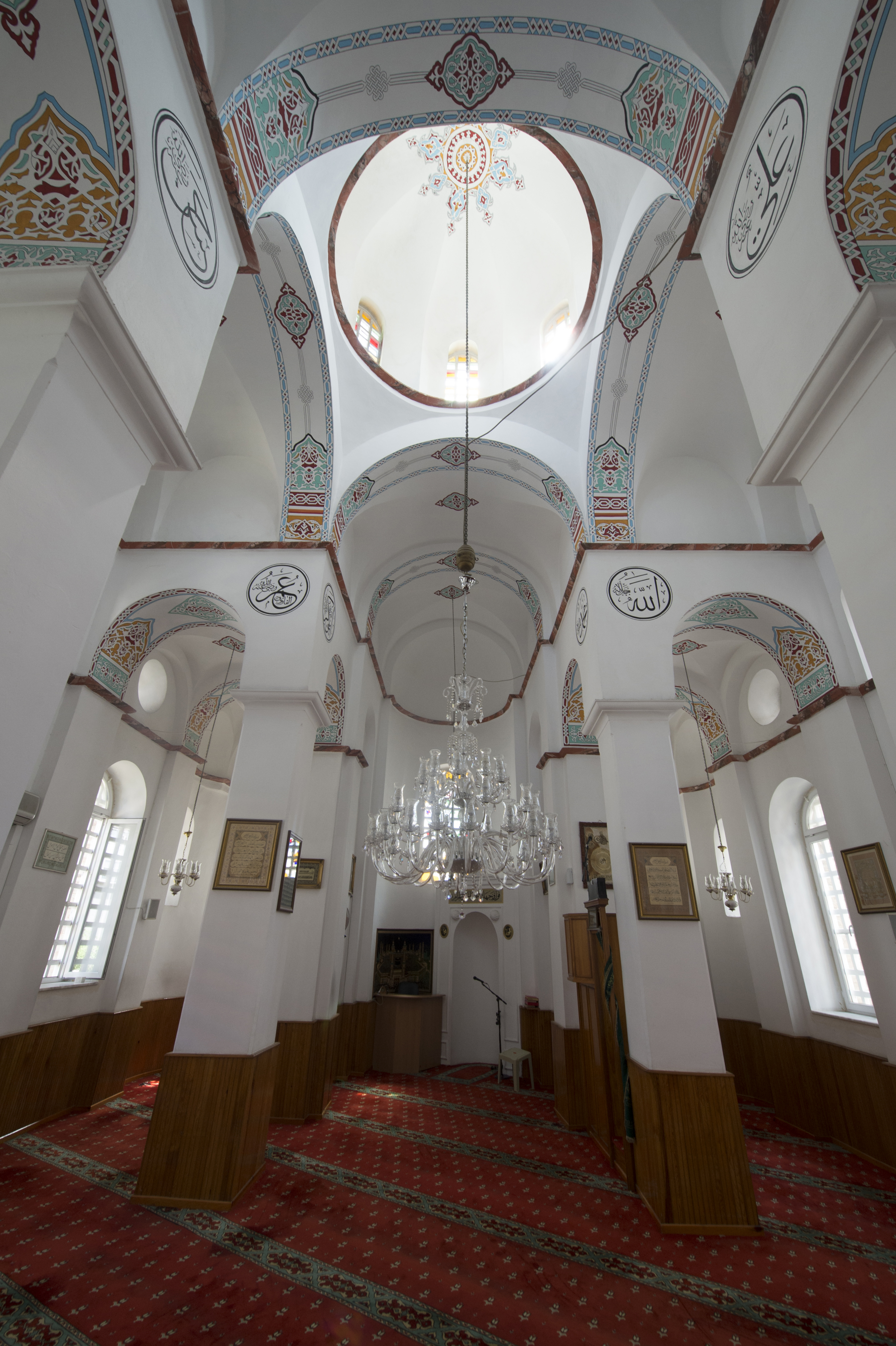
Bodrum Mosque interior

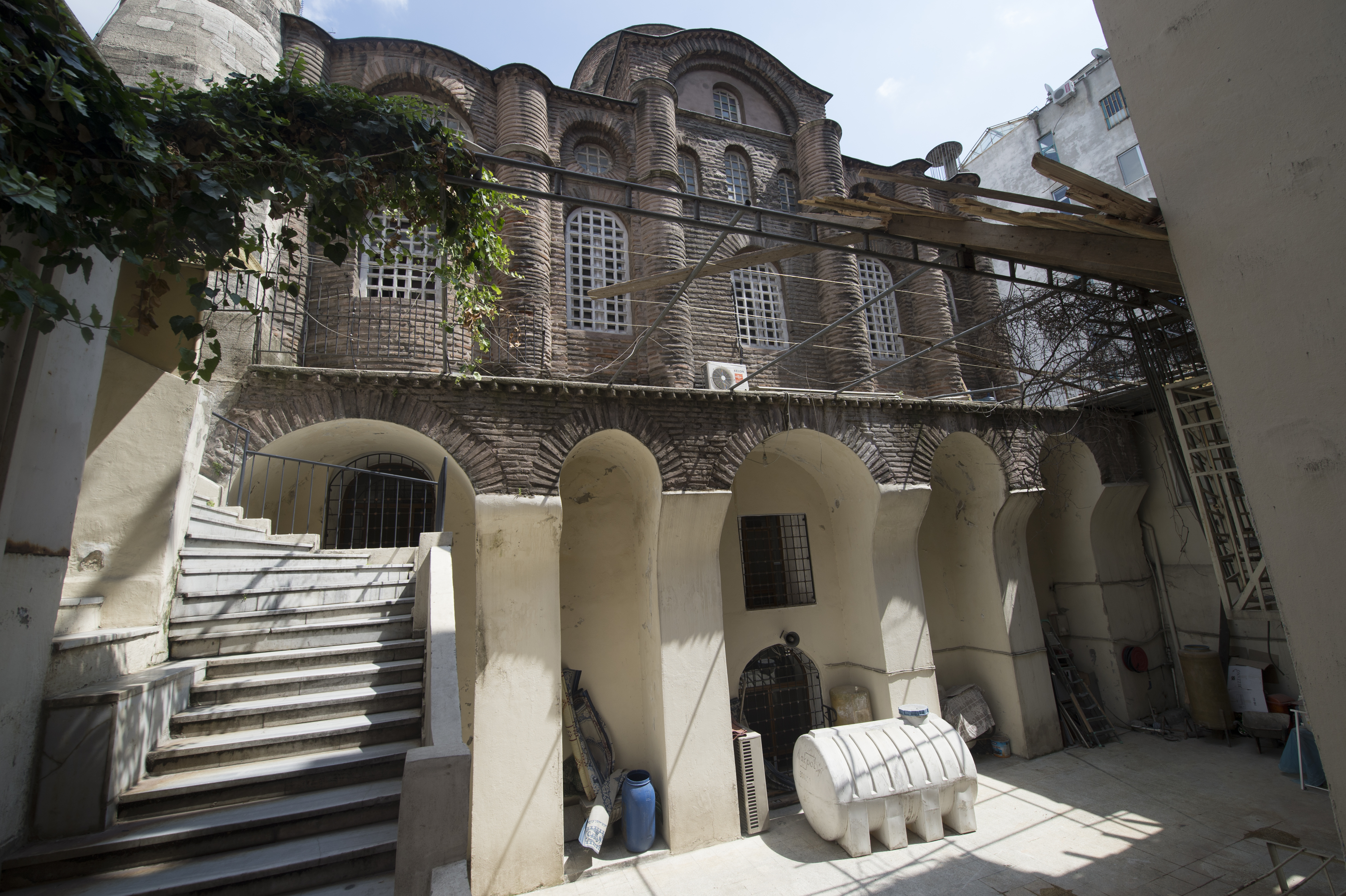
Bodrum Mosque view from below

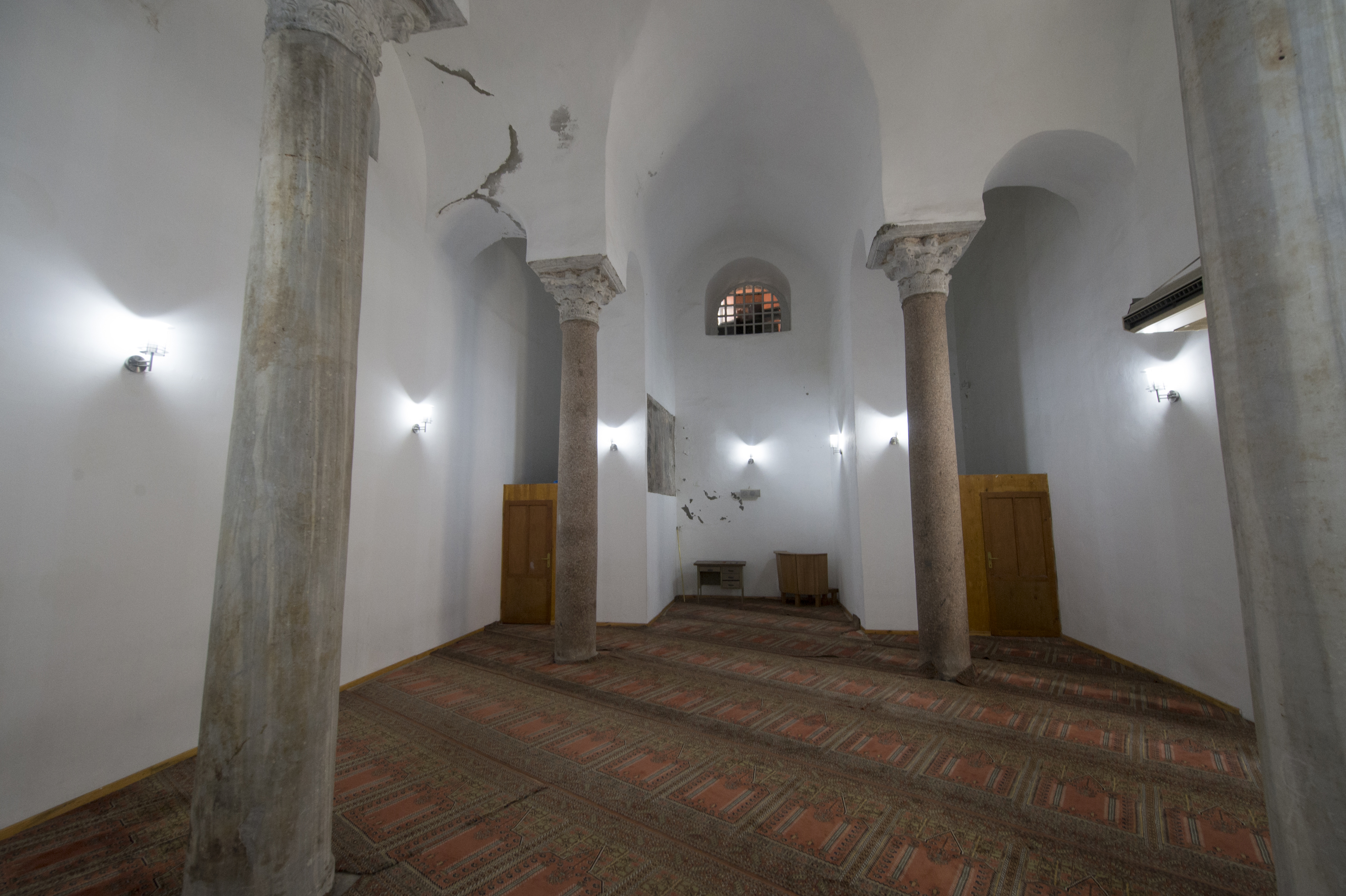
Bodrum Mosque crypt

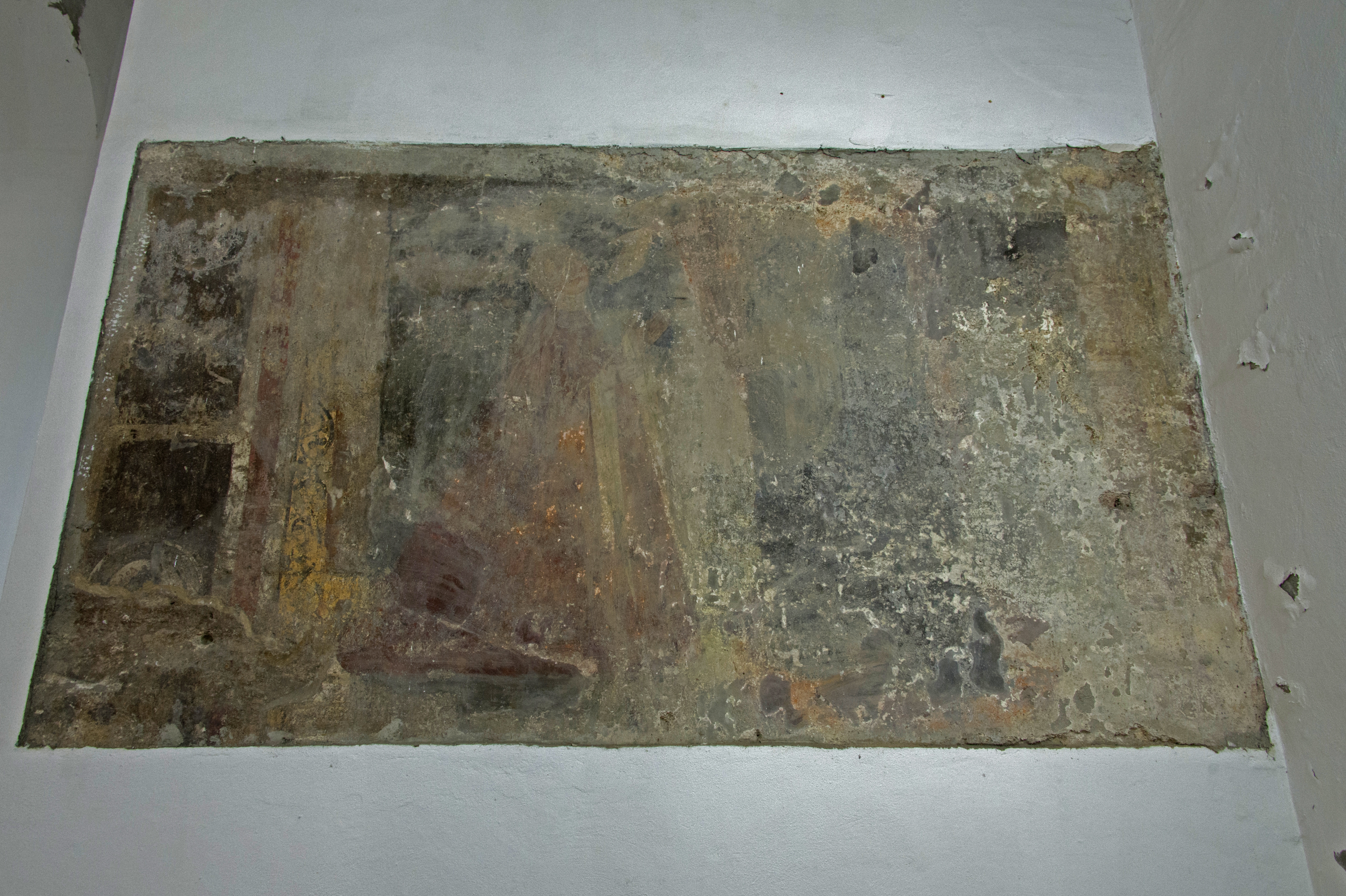
Bodrum Mosque fresco in crypt

== See also ==
- Ancient Roman and Byzantine domes

== Sources ==
- Mathews, Thomas F. (1976). The Byzantine Churches of Istanbul: A Photographic Survey. University Park: Pennsylvania State University Press. ISBN 0-271-01210-2.
- Gülersoy, Çelik (1976). A guide to Istanbul. Istanbul: Istanbul Kitaplığı. OCLC 3849706.
- Striker, Cecil L. (1981). The Myrelaion (Bodrum Camii) in Istanbul. Princeton NJ: Princeton University Press.
- Krautheimer, Richard (1986). Architettura paleocristiana e bizantina (in Italian). Turin: Einaudi. ISBN 88-06-59261-0.
