= Oculus (architecture) =

Circular opening in the center of a dome or in a wall

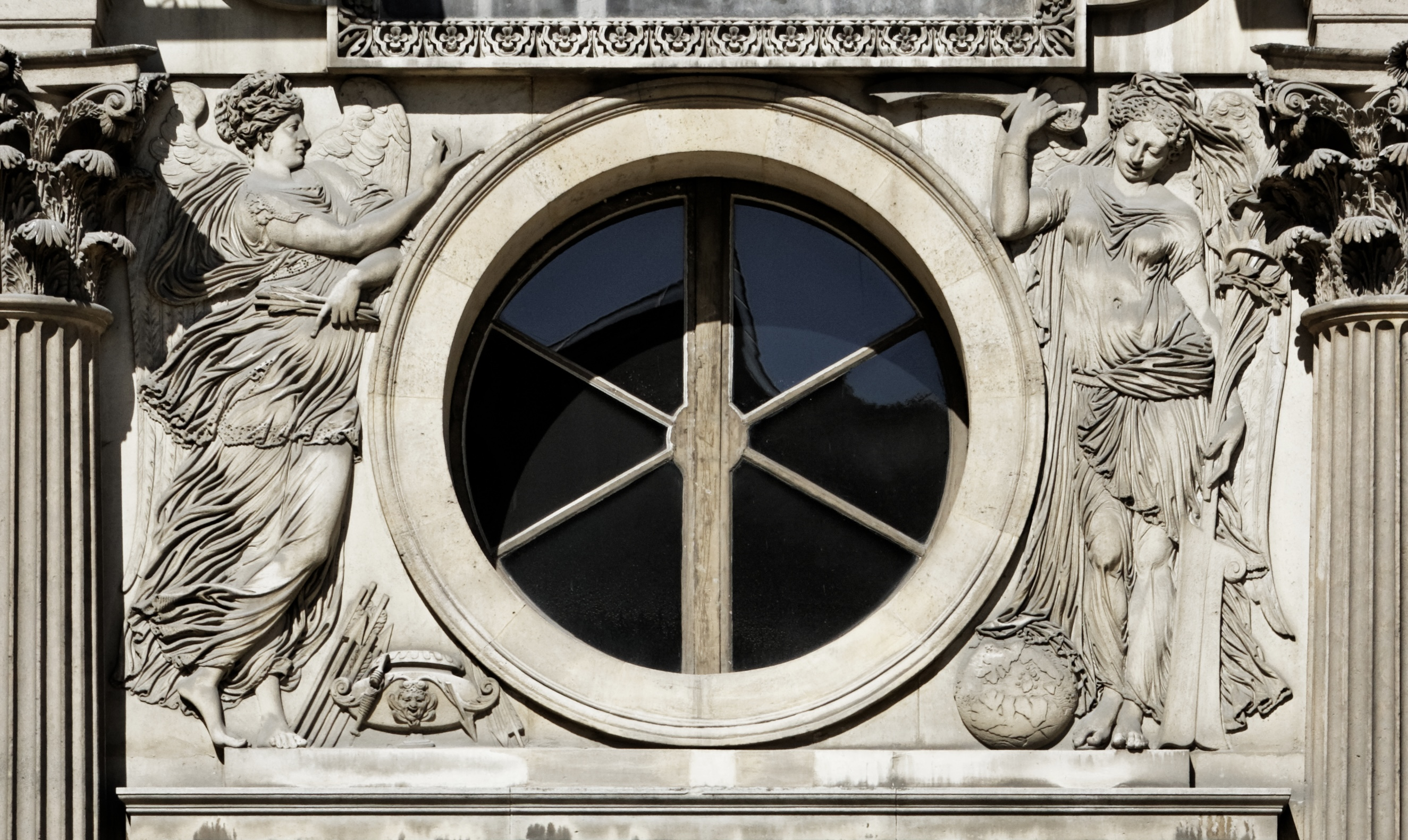
Renaissance oculus on the west facade of the Cour Carrée of the Louvre Palace, with figures of war and peace, sculpted by Jean Goujon and designed by Pierre Lescot, 1548

An oculus (from Latin oculus 'eye'; pl. oculi) is a circular opening in the center of a dome or in a wall. Originating in classical architecture, it is a feature of Byzantine and Neoclassical architecture.

A horizontal oculus in the center of a dome is also called opaion (from Ancient Greek ὀπαῖον (opaîon) '(smoke) hole'; pl. opaia).

== Oeil-de-boeuf ==
An oeil-de-boeuf (French: [œj.də.bœf]; English: "bull's eye"), also œil de bœuf and sometimes anglicized as ox-eye window, is a relatively small elliptical window, typically for an upper storey, and sometimes set in a roof slope as a dormer, or above a door to let in natural light. These are relatively small windows, traditionally oval. The term is increasingly used for circular windows (in which case it could also be called an oculus), but not for holes in domes or ceilings.

Windows of this type are commonly found in the grand architecture of Baroque France. The term is also applied to similar round windows, such as those found in Georgian architecture in Great Britain, and later Greek Revival and Colonial Revival styles in North America, so that must be considered part of the usage. The term initially applied to horizontal elliptical windows, but is also used for vertical ones.

The spread is not limited to ecclesiastical architecture. This type of window can also be found in the late Romanesque period in the area of secular architecture in the castles of Frederick II of Hohenstaufen, Holy Roman Emperor from 1220 to 1250, (Castel del Monte, Palazzo San Gervasio, on the donjon in the castle of Lucera, etc.), later also in Renaissance palaces and villas and in the Baroque.

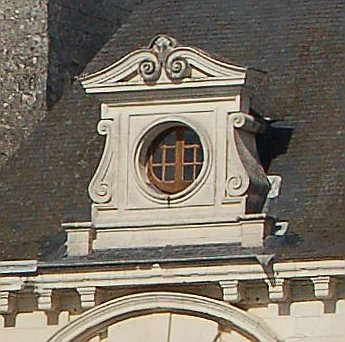
An oeil-de-boeuf window of the Château de Chenonceau, France

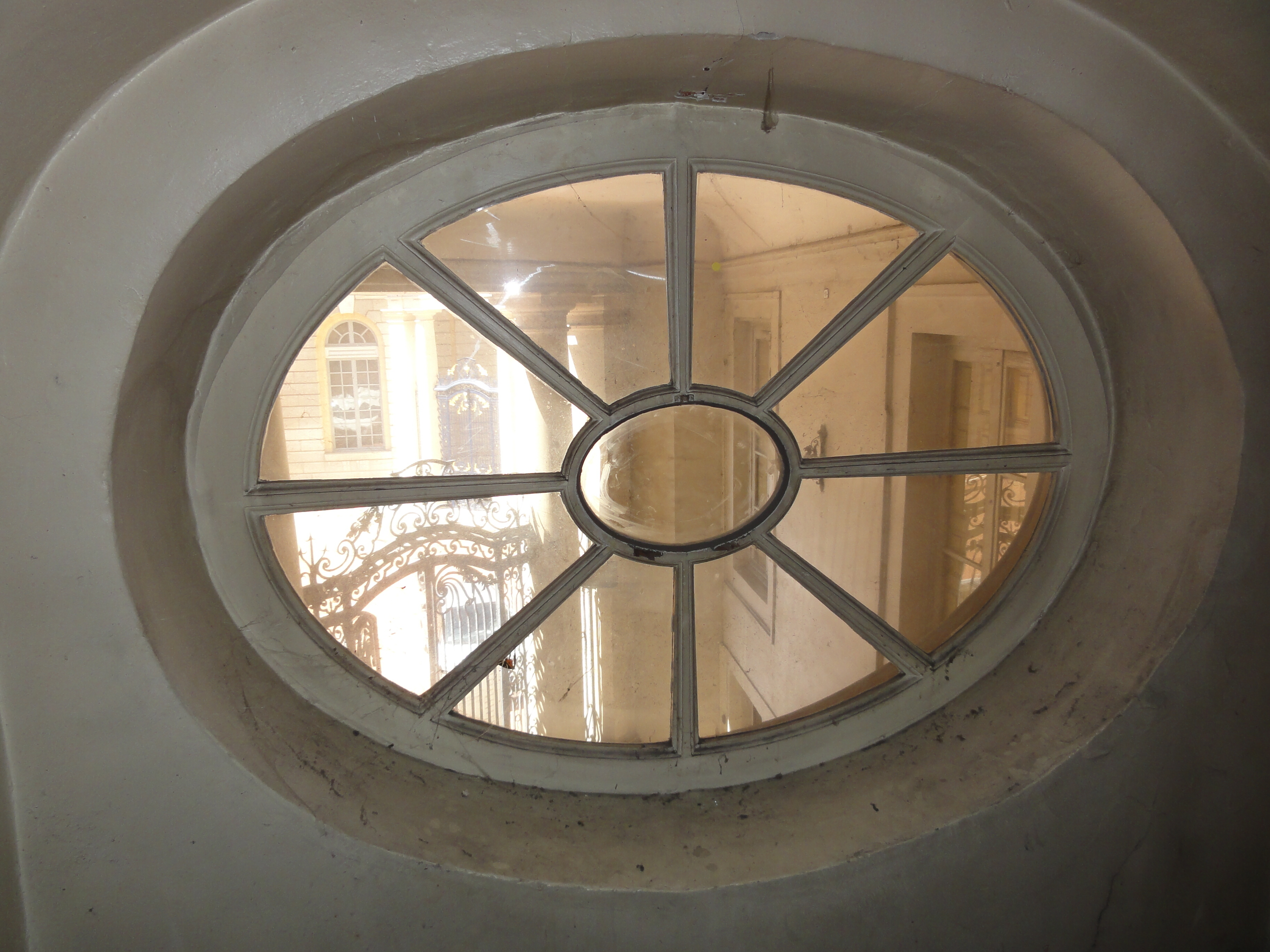
An "œil de bœuf" window in Lyon (France)

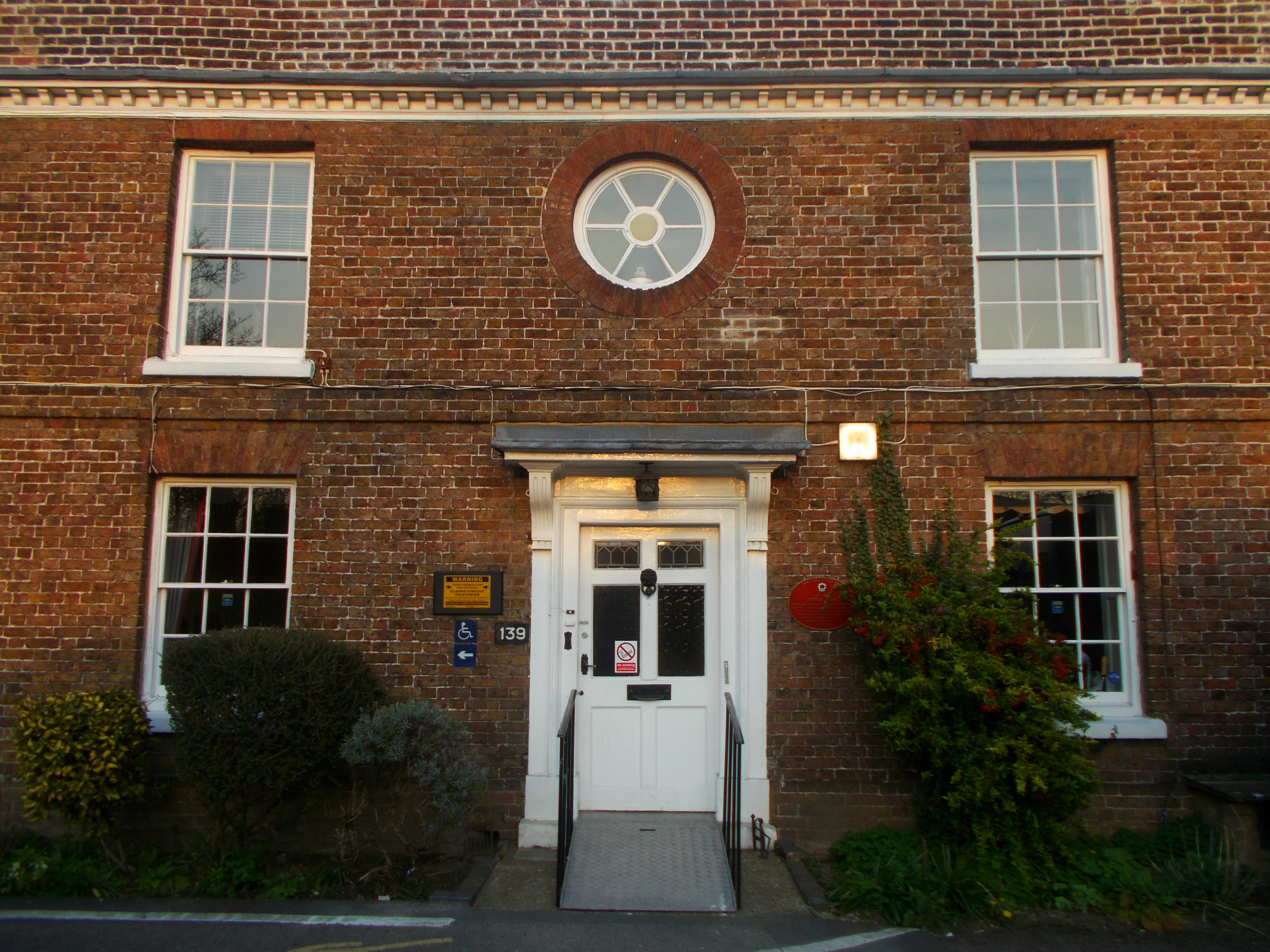
An oeil-de-boeuf window in the Georgian Sutton Lodge in Sutton, London.

== History ==
=== Classical ===
The oculus was used in Ancient Roman architecture, one of the finest examples being that in the dome of the Pantheon, Rome. Open to the weather, it allows rain and air to enter and fall to the floor, where it is carried away through drains. Though the opening looks small, it actually has a diameter of 8.7 m (29 feet), allowing it to light the building.

=== Byzantine ===
The oculus was widely used in the architecture of the Byzantine Empire. It was applied to buildings in Syria in the 5th and 6th centuries and again in the 10th century. In Constantinople's Myrelaion Church (c. 920), there are two oculi above the stringcourse on both lateral facades.

=== Renaissance ===
Early examples of the oculus in Renaissance architecture can be seen in Florence Cathedral, in the nave clerestory and topping the crowns of the arcade arches.

=== Neoclassical ===
Since the revival of dome construction beginning in the Italian Renaissance, open oculi have been replaced by light-transmitting cupolas and other round windows, openings, and skylights. They can be seen in the pediments of Palladio's Villa Rotonda, though not in the dome. Use of oculus windows became more popular in Baroque architecture. Widely used by Neo-Palladian architects including Colen Campbell, one can be seen in the dome of Thomas Jefferson's Rotunda at the University of Virginia.

== Examples ==
Short visual history of oculli
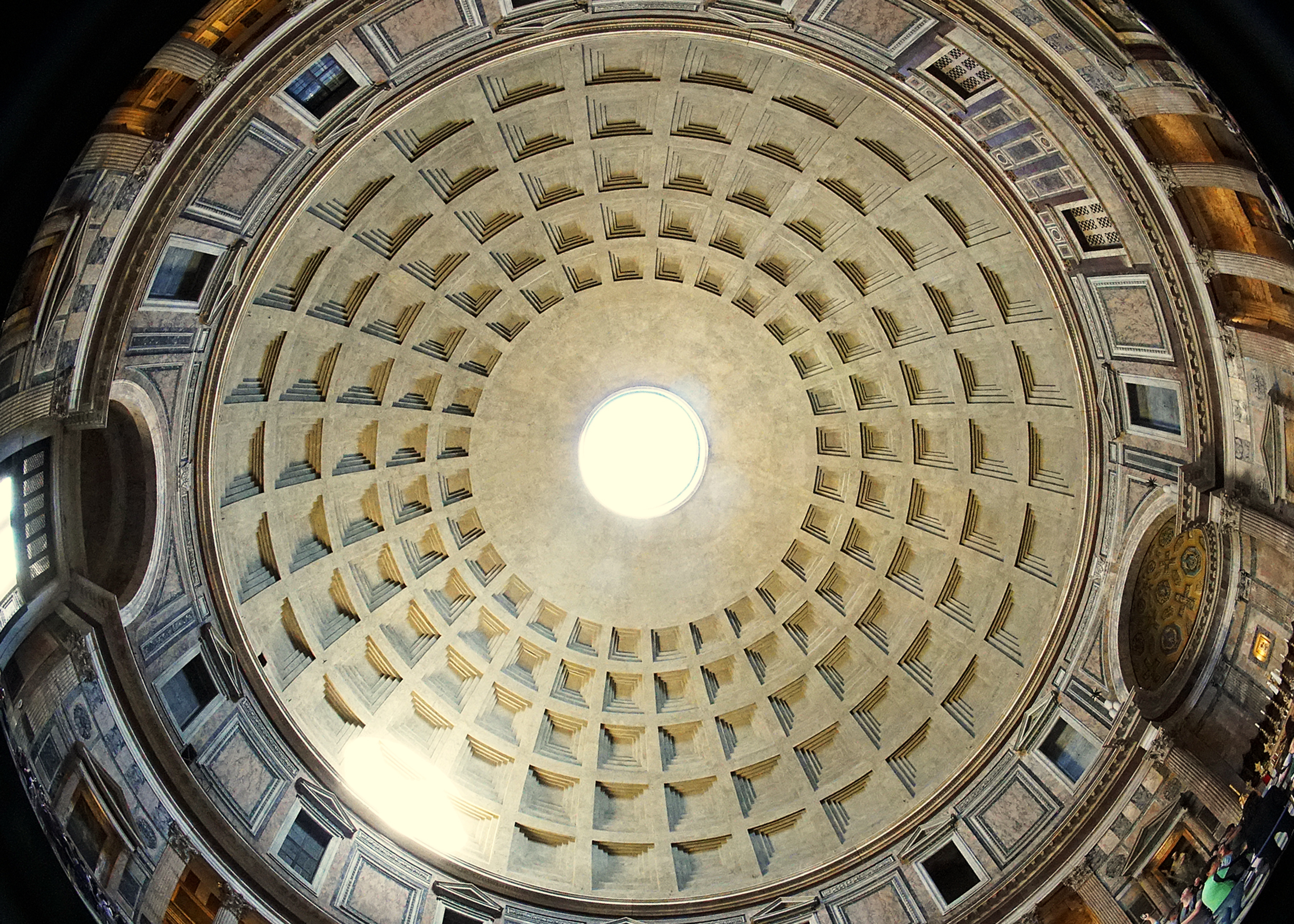
The Ancient Roman oculus (opaion) of the Pantheon, Rome, Italy

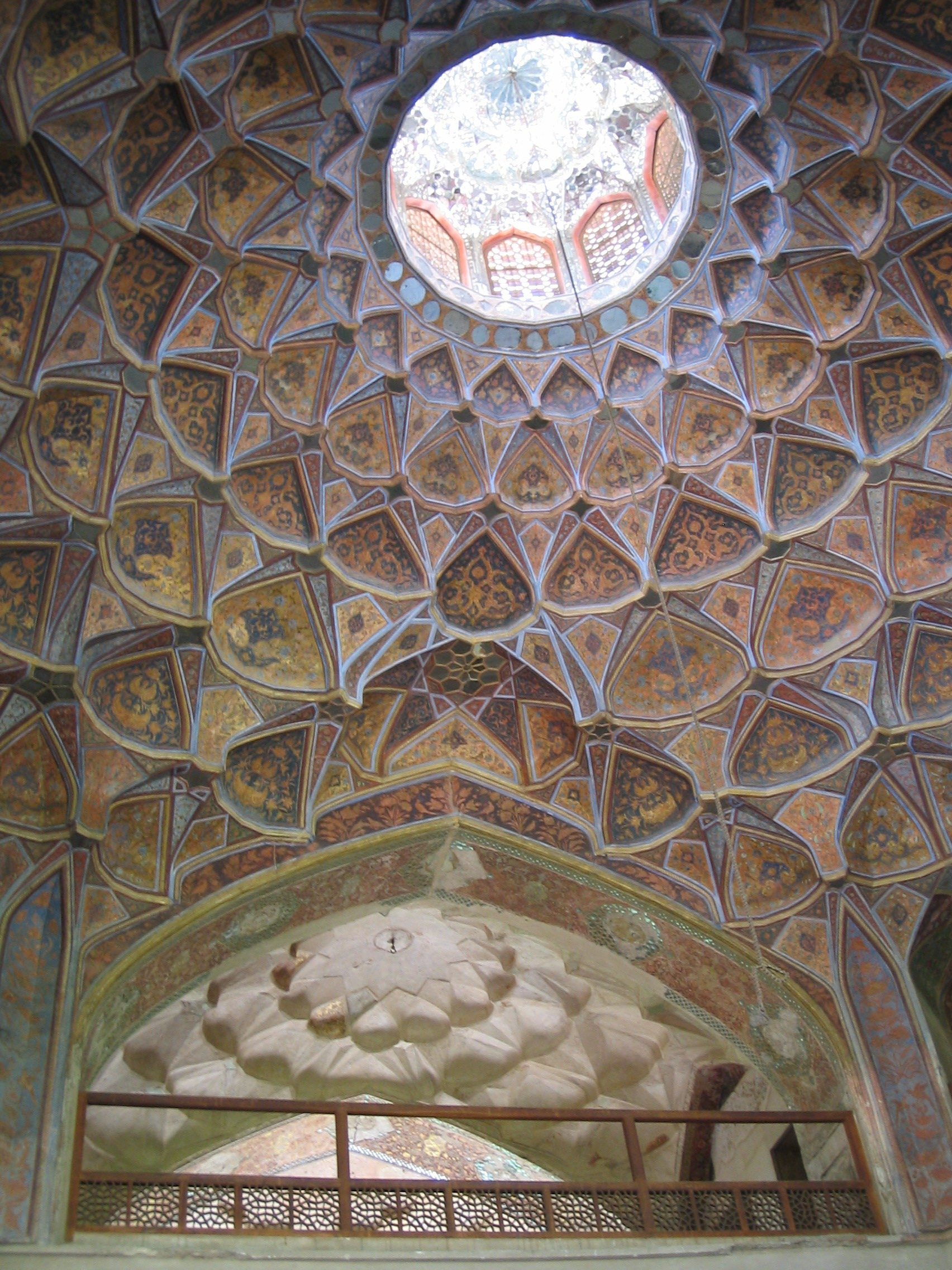
Islamic oculus (opaion) opening into a cupola in the Hasht Behesht, Isfahan, Iran

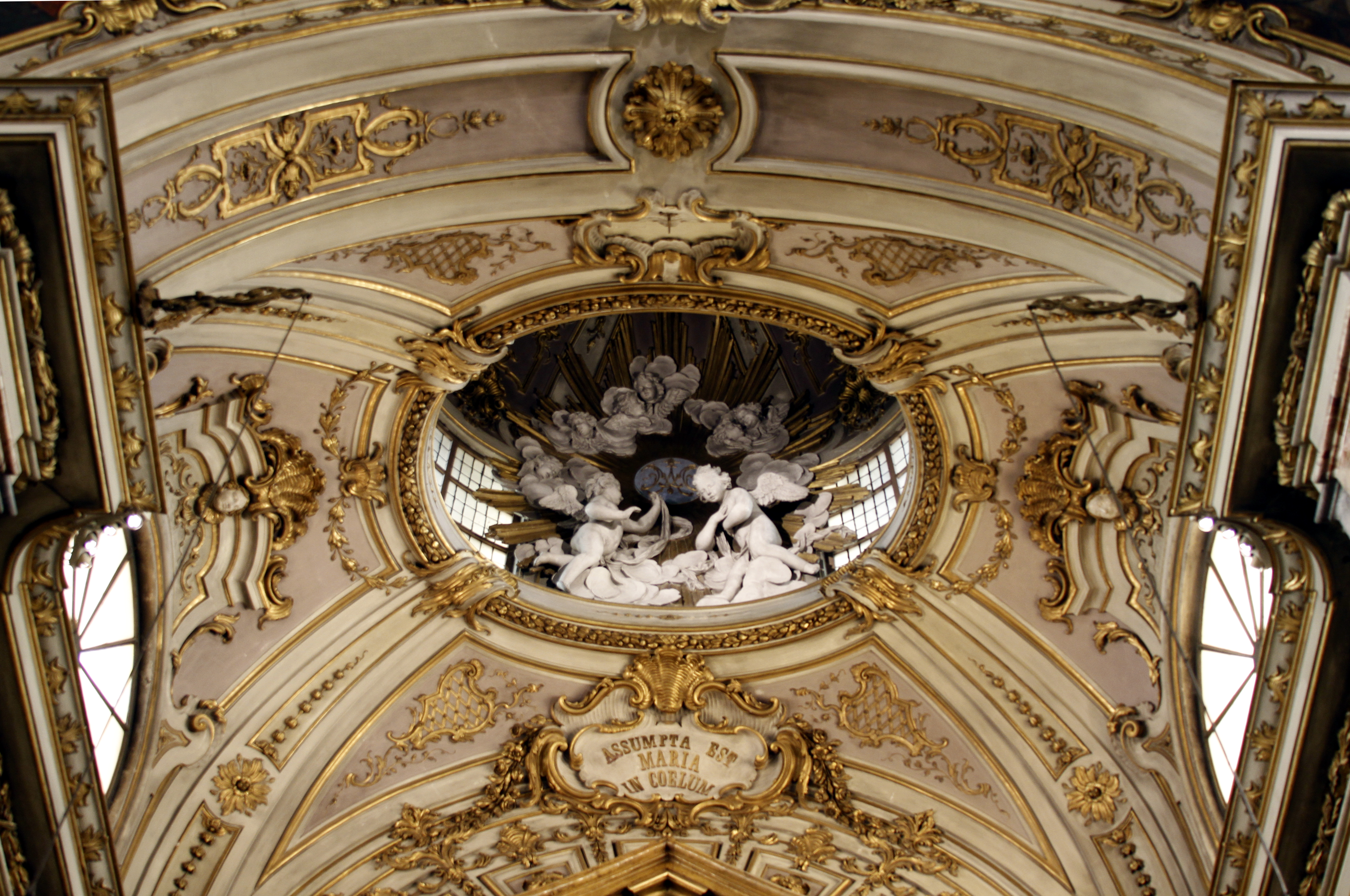
Baroque oculus (opaion) in a dome of the Ravenna Cathedral, Ravenna, Italy

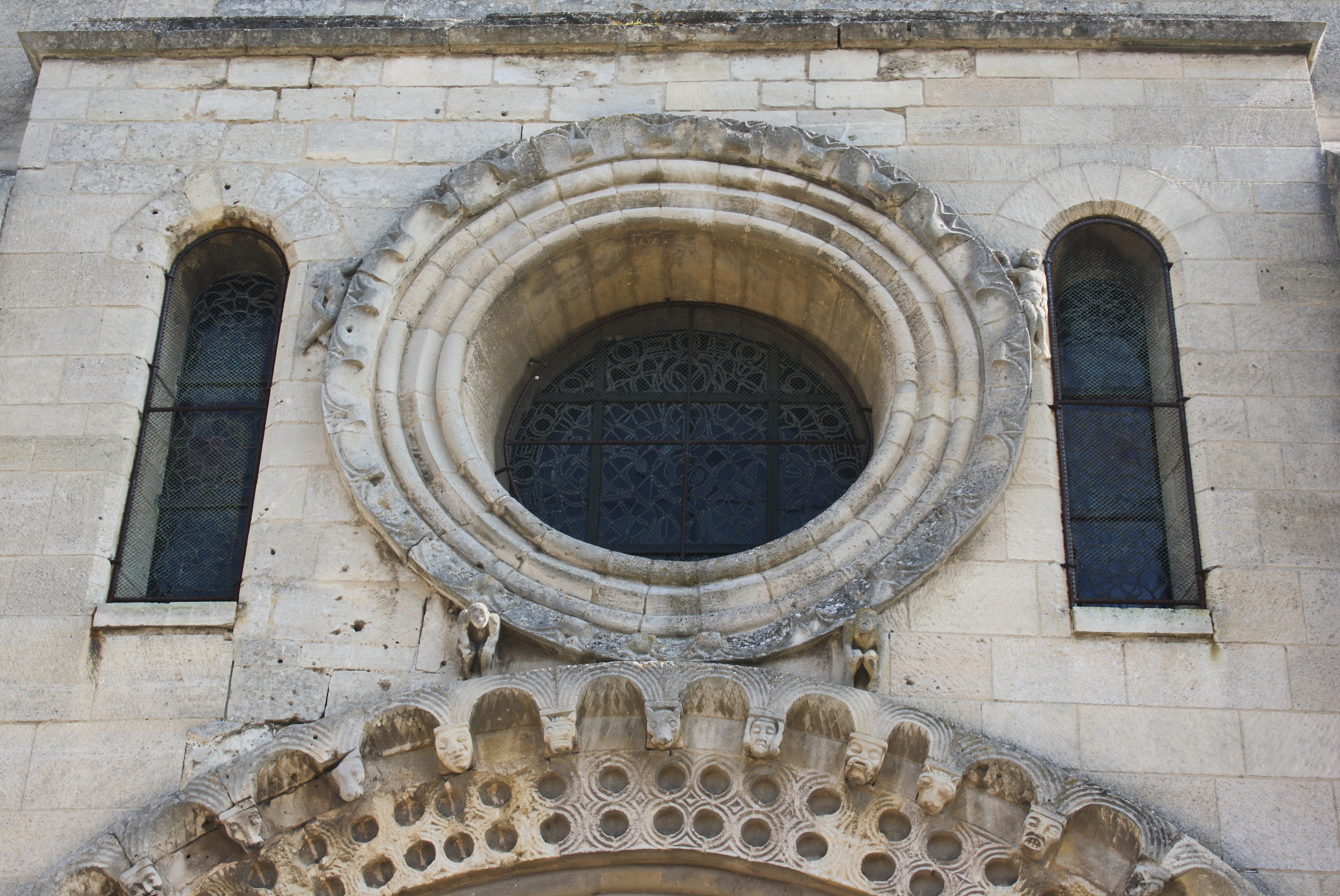
Romanesque oculus of the Église Sainte-Anne de Gassicourt, Mantes-la-Jolie, France

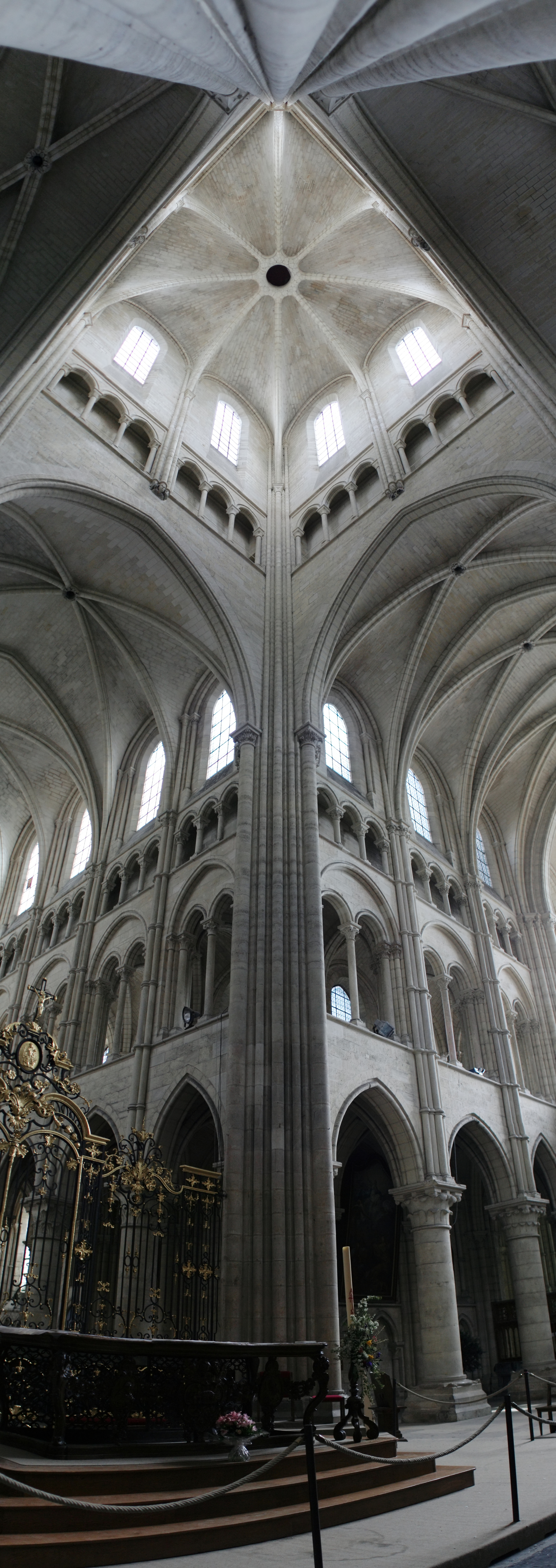
Gothic oculus in the Laon Cathedral, Laon, France

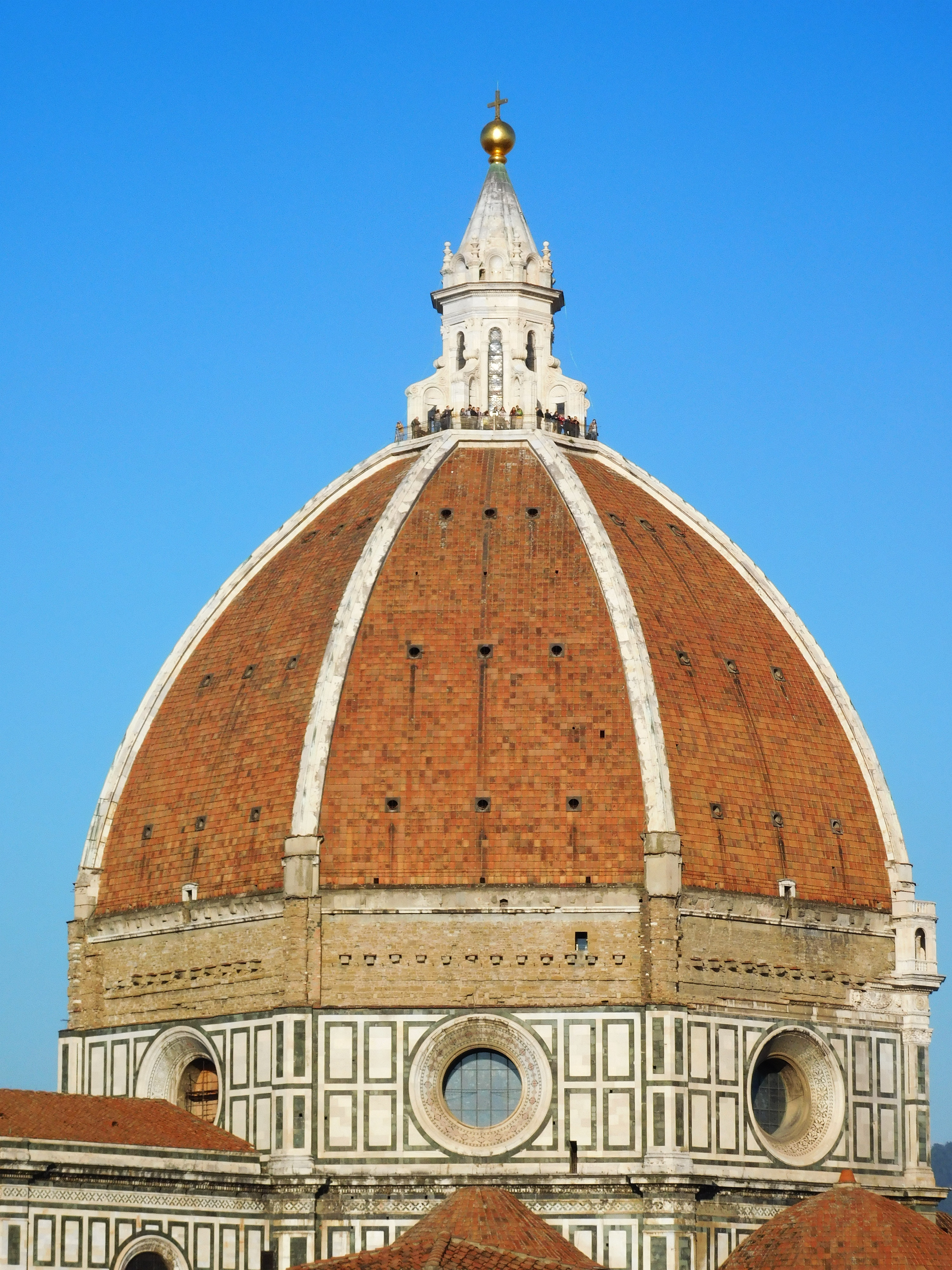
Renaissance oculus of the Florence Cathedral, Florence, Italy

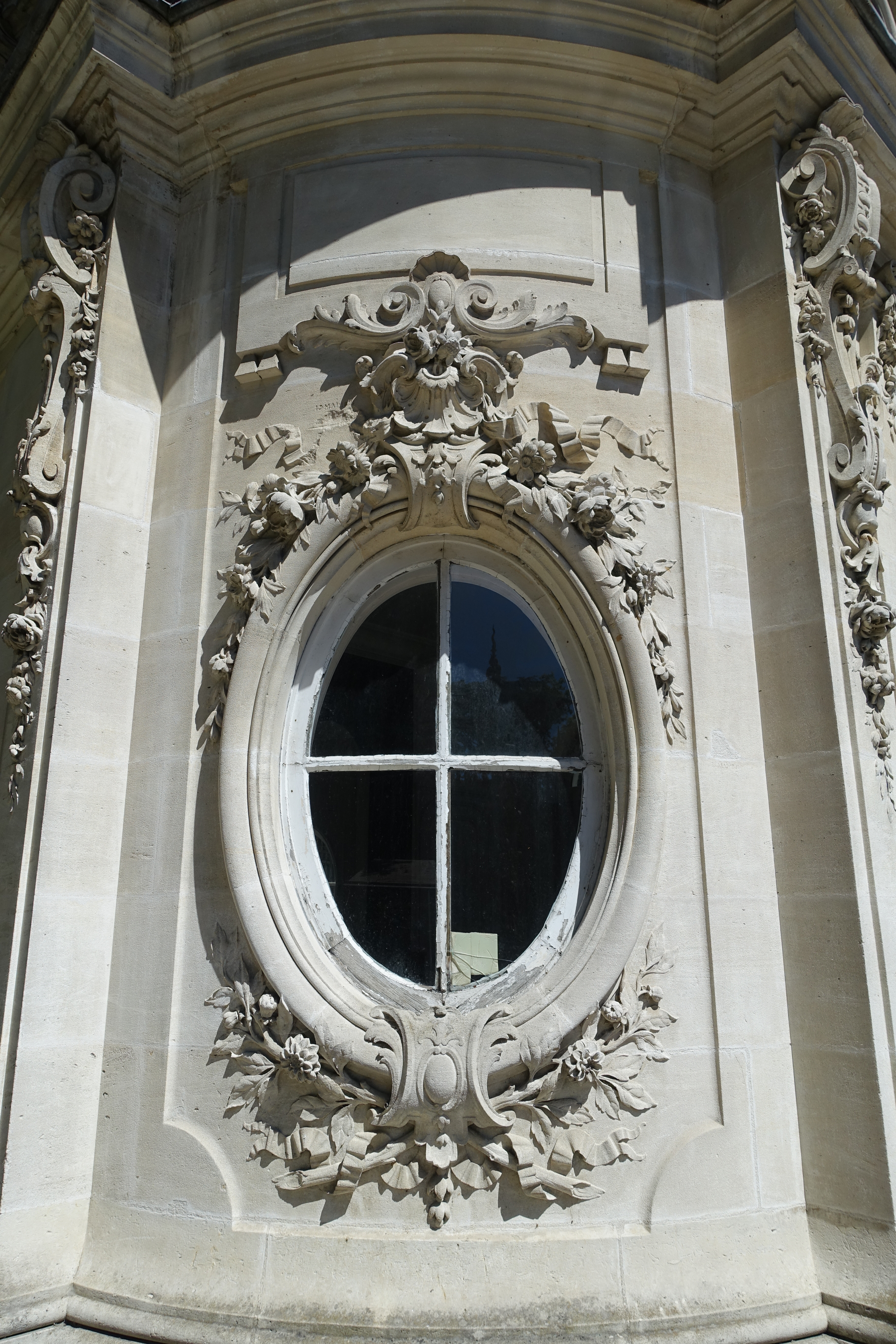
Rococo oculus in the Parc de Bagatelle (Paris)

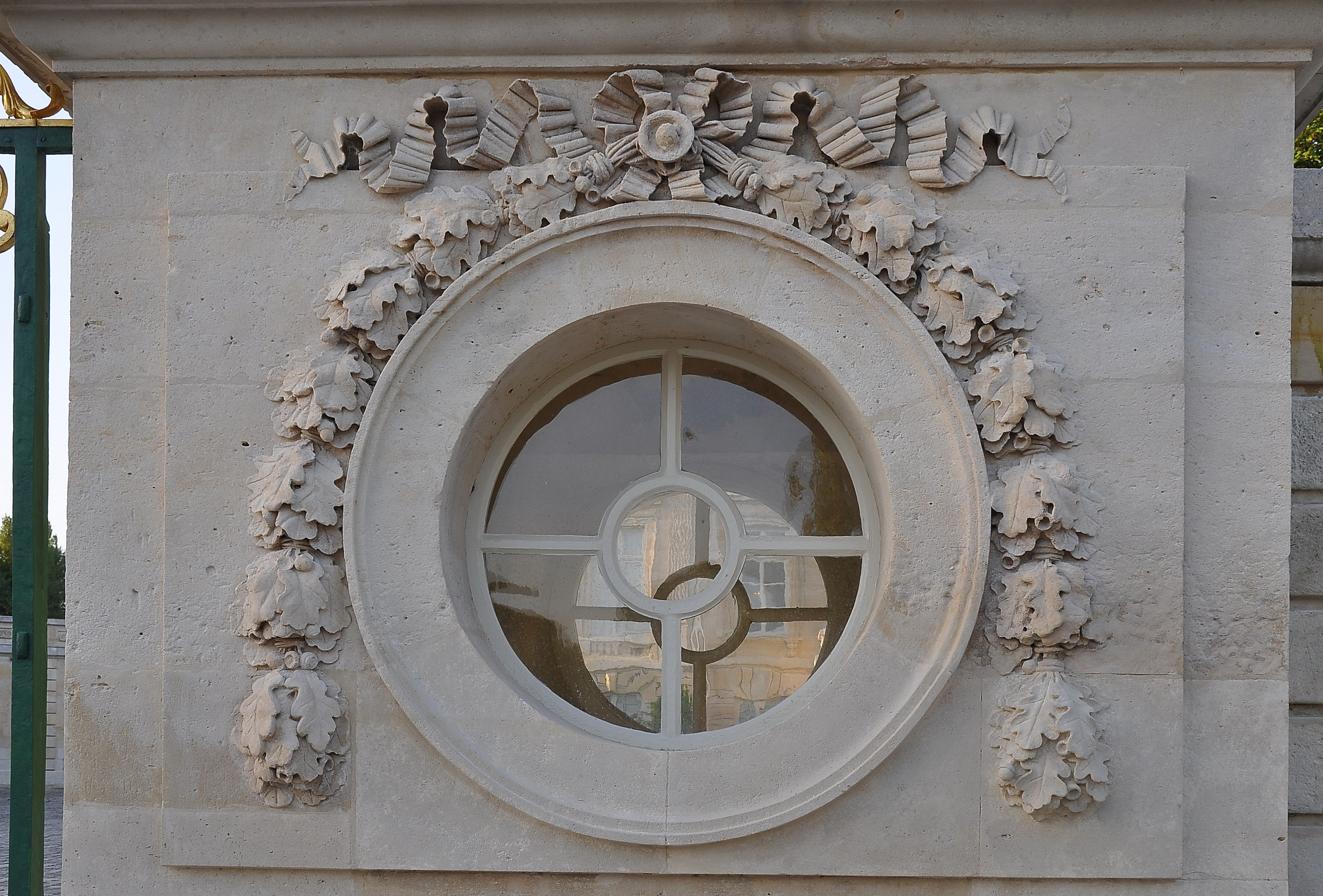
Louis XVI round window of the Petit Trianon (Versailles, France), with a festoon-derived ornament at the top

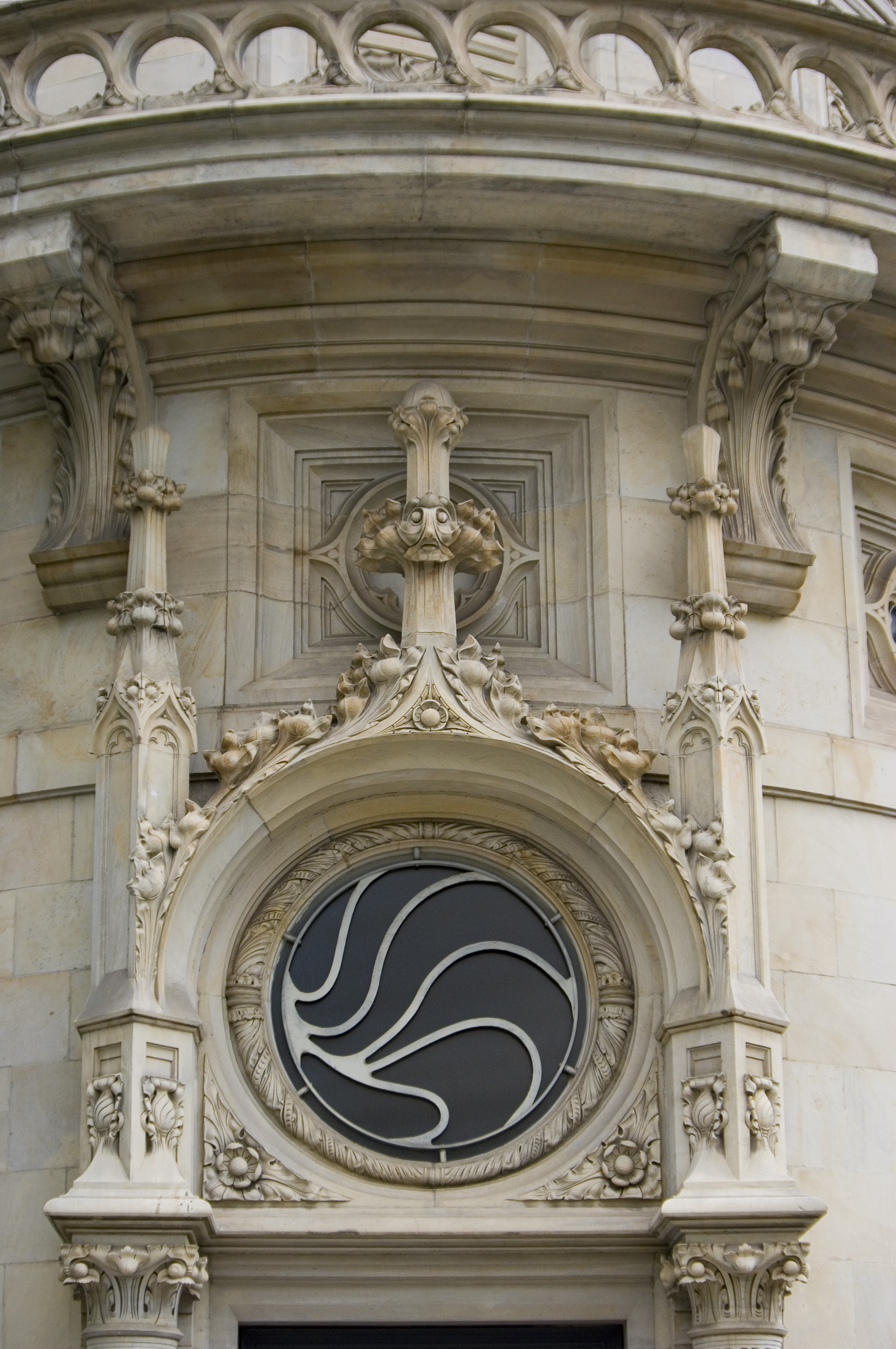
Gothic Revival oculus of the Hannoversche Bank - Haus III on Georgstraße, Hannover, Germany

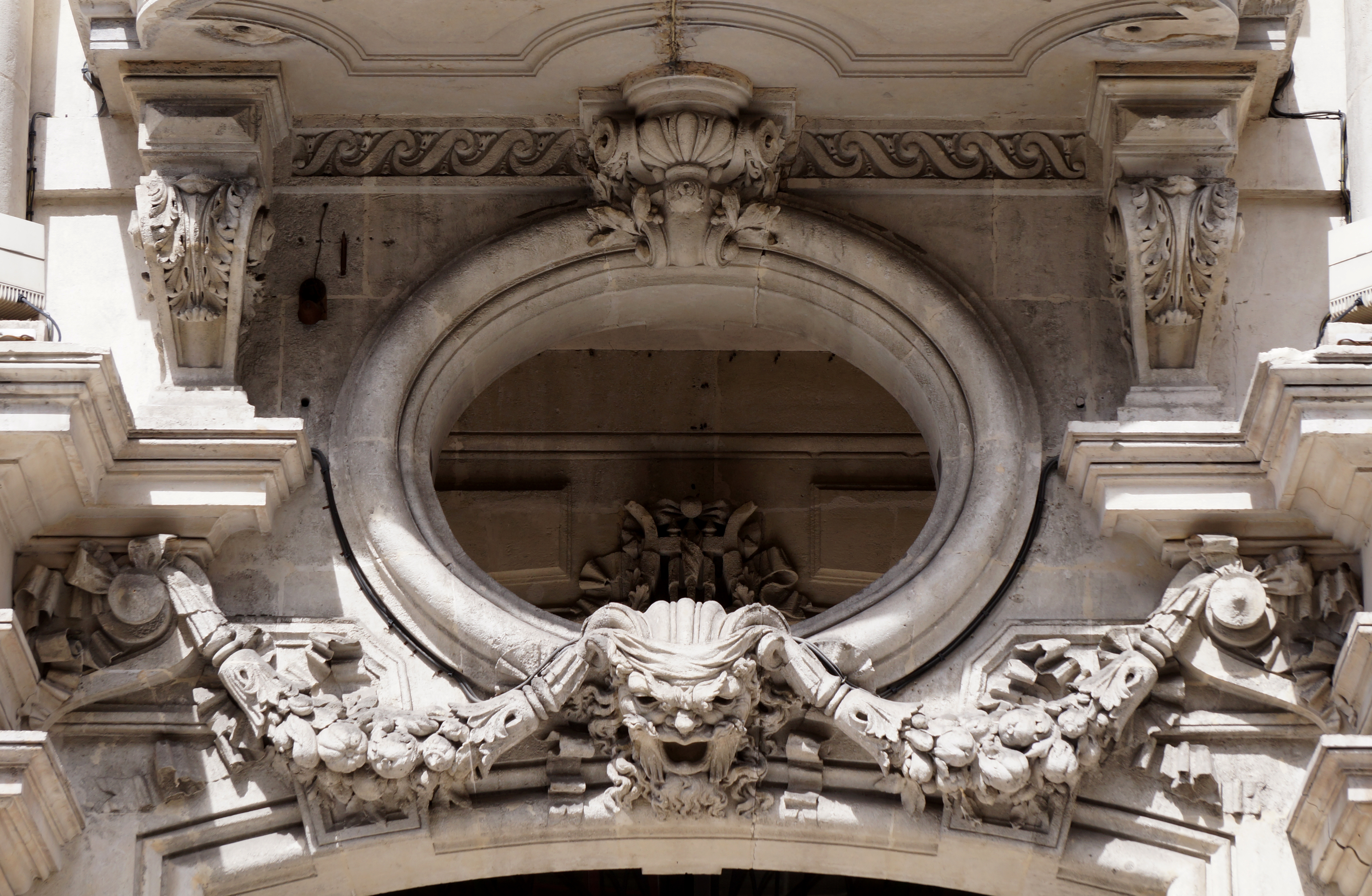
19th century Eclectic Classicist oculus of the Opéra-Théâtre de Clermont-Ferrand, Clermont-Ferrand, France

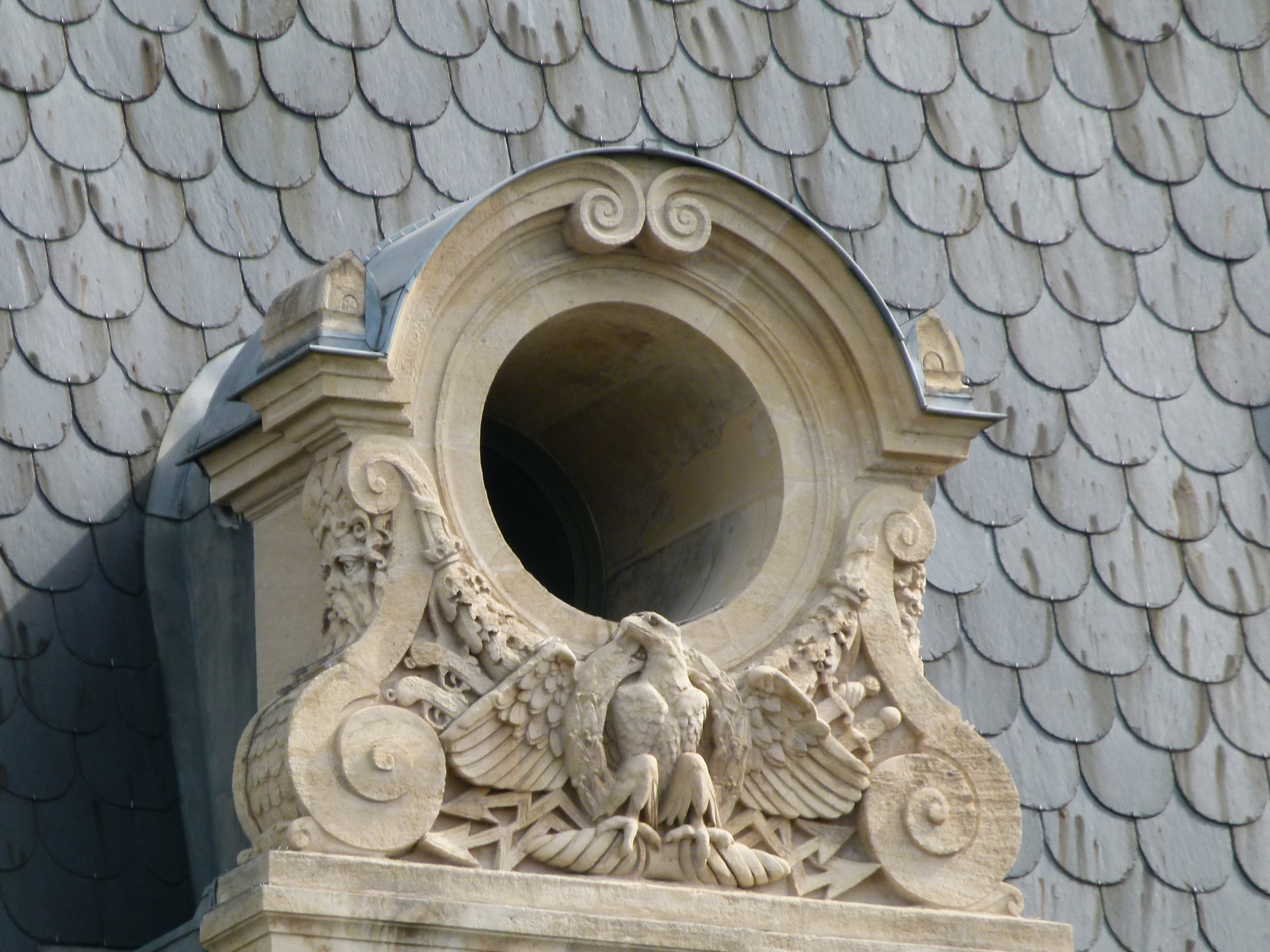
Beaux-Arts dormer oculus of the Building of Préfecture de Police de Paris, Île de la Cité

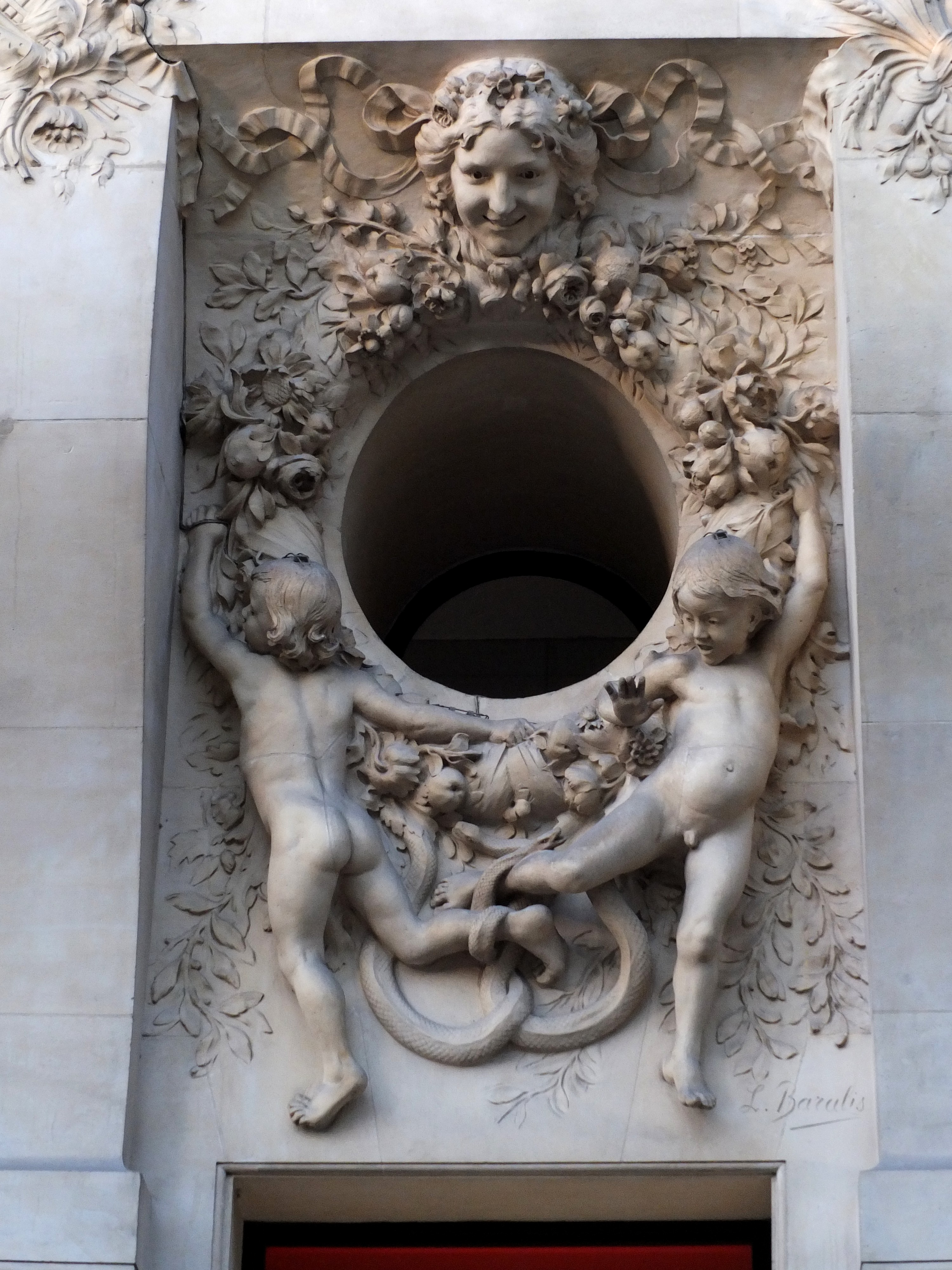
Art Nouveau oculus of the Hôtel Élysée Palace, Paris

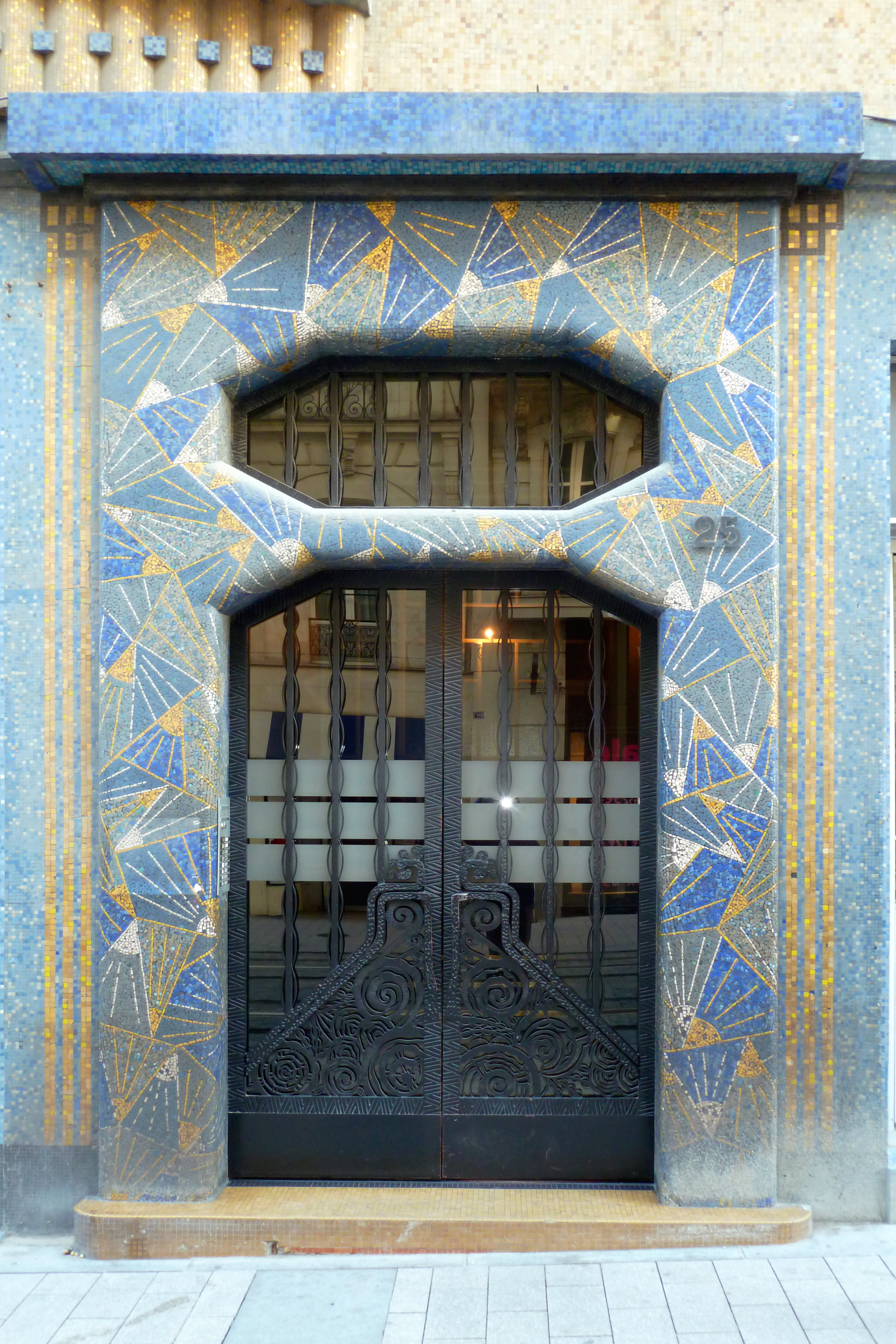
Art Deco oculus above a door in Angers, France
