= Hacı Beşir Ağa Mosque =

Mosque in Fatih, Istanbul, Turkey

Haji Beşir Agha Mosque
- Hacı Beşir Ağa Camii
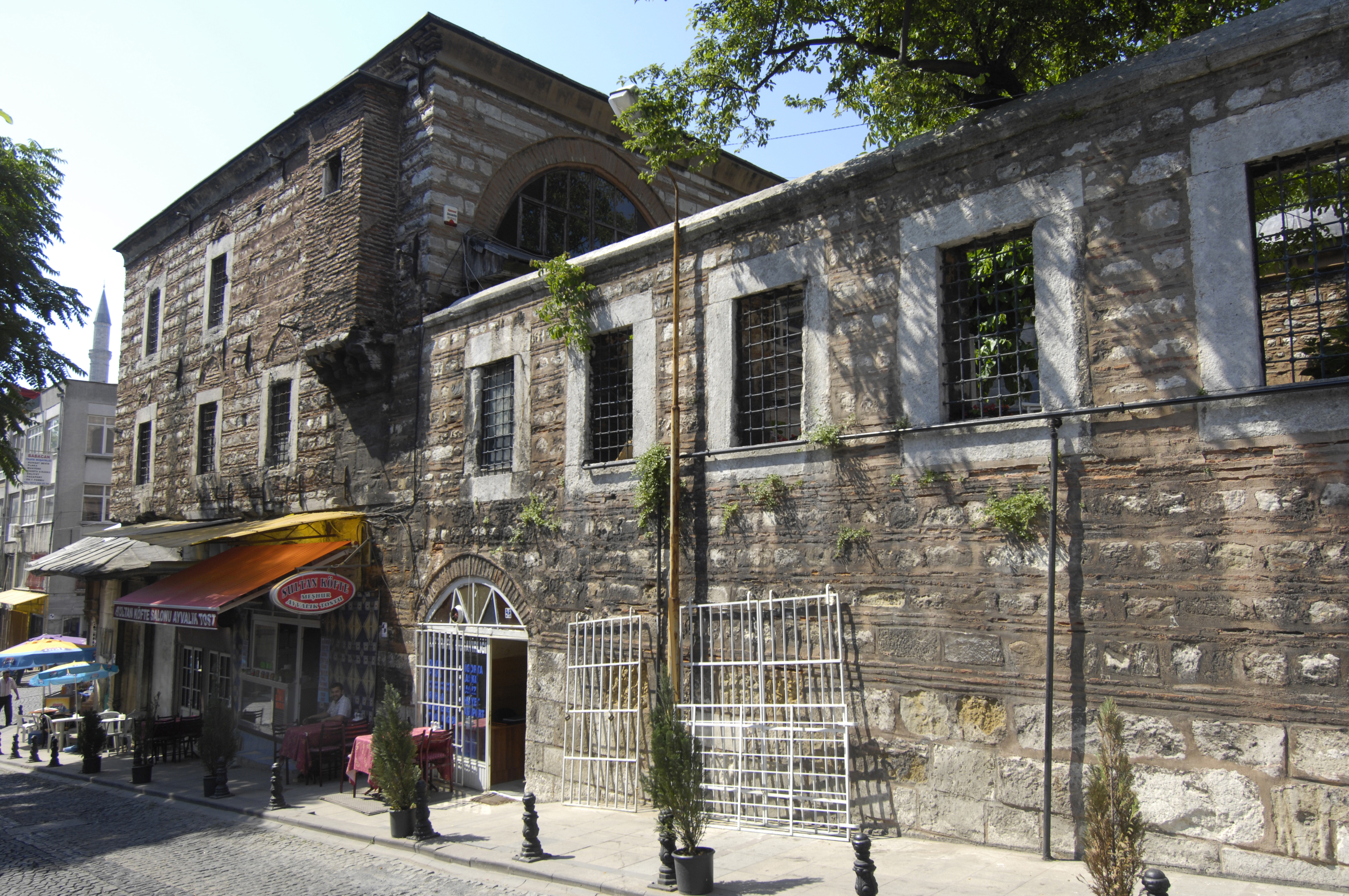

- Location within Istanbul

Religion
- Affiliation: Islam

Location
- Location: Fatih District, Istanbul
- Country: Turkey
- Interactive map of Haji Beşir Agha Mosque
- Coordinates: 41.01069°N 28.97727°E

Architecture
- Style: Baroque
- Completed: 1745; 281 years ago

The Haji Beshir Agha Mosque (Turkish: Hacı Beşir Ağa Camii), located in Istanbul's Fatih district, was built in 1745. The design of the Haji Beşir Agha Mosque can be described as baroque.

== Gallery ==
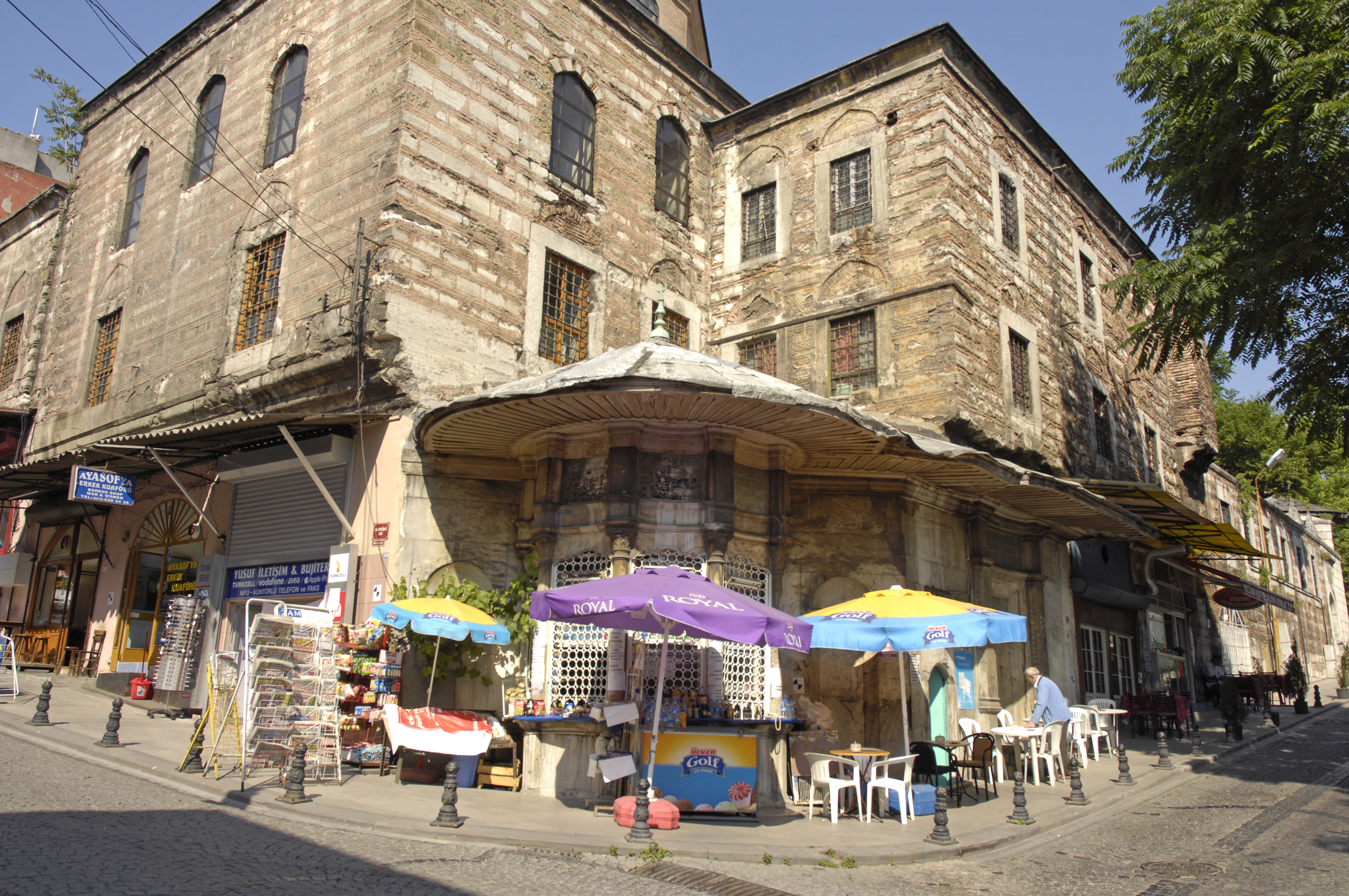
Haji Beşir Agha Mosque exterior

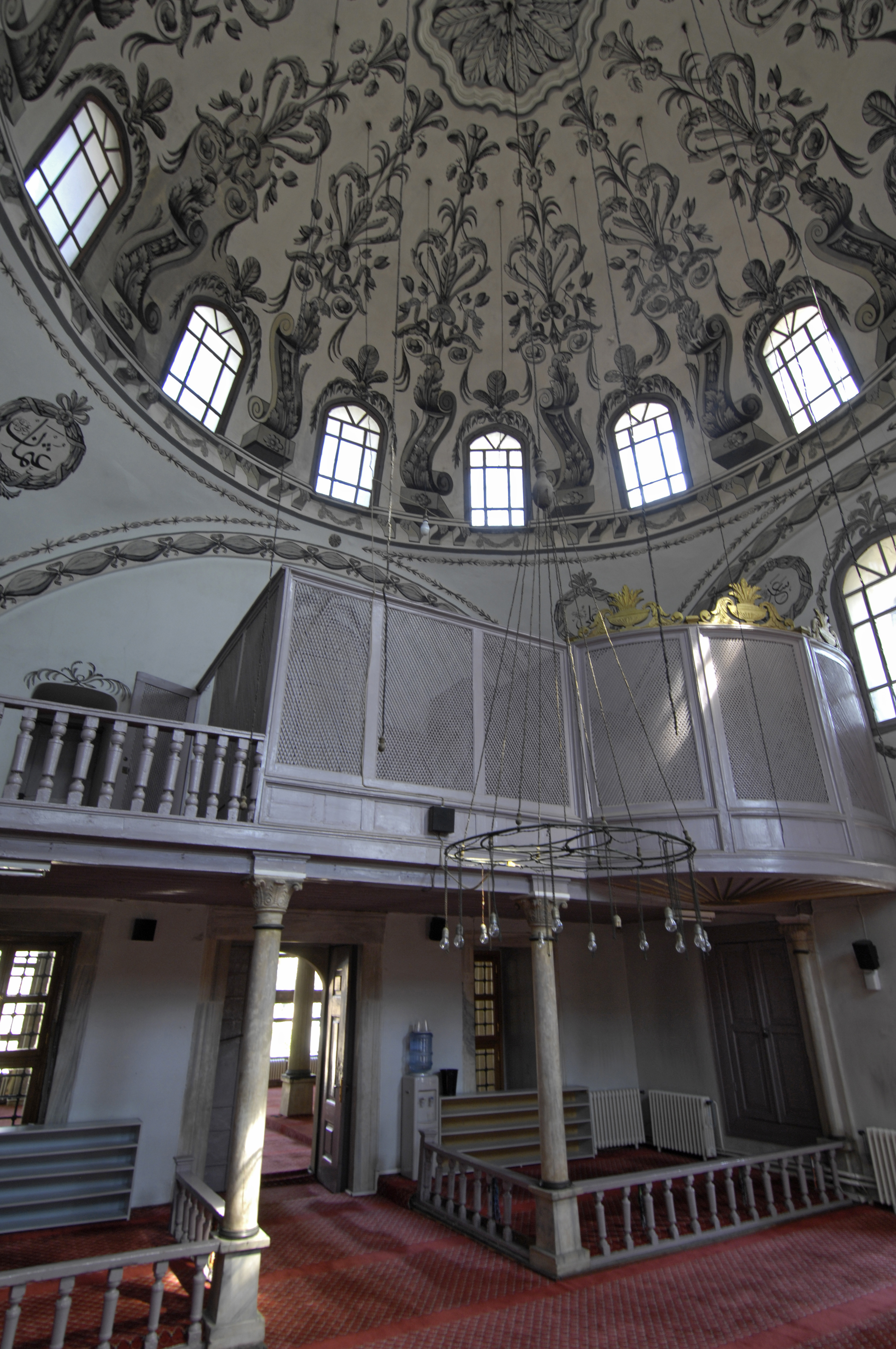
Haji Beşir Agha Mosque interior

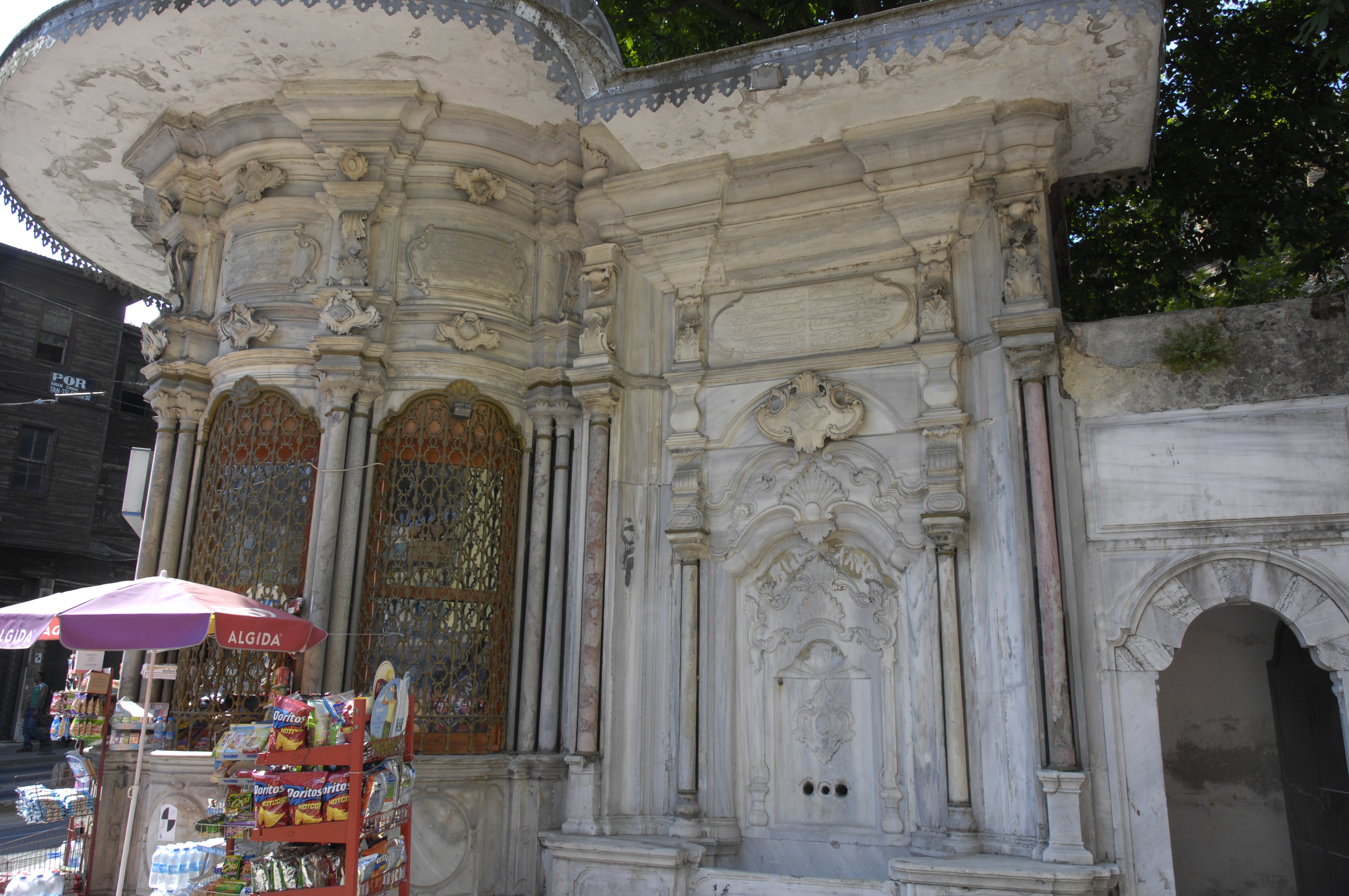
Haji Beşir Agha Mosque fountain
