= Hammam =

Place of public bathing common in Muslim societies

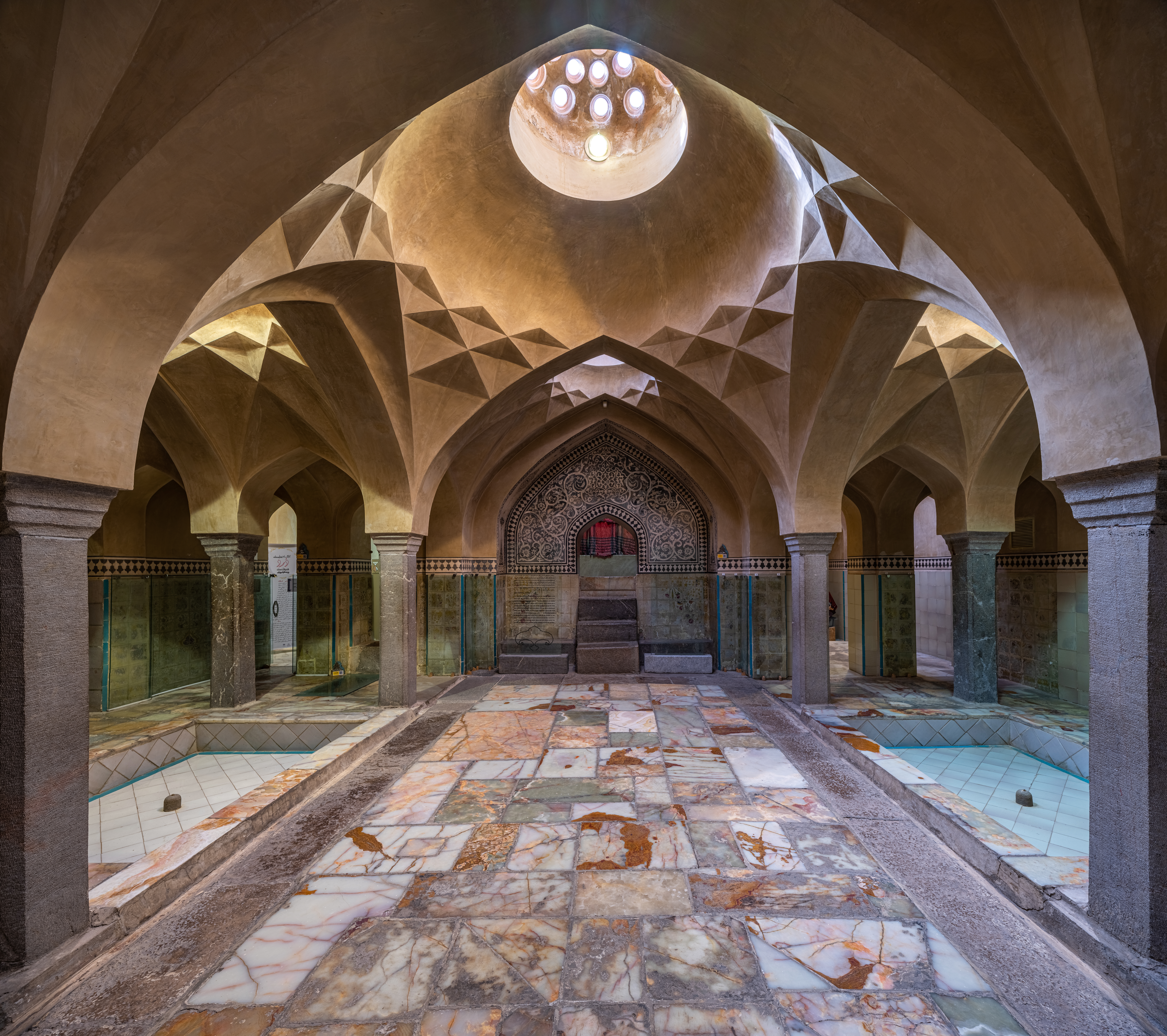
Ali Gholi Agha hammam, Isfahan, Iran

A hammam (Arabic: حمّام, romanized: ḥammām), also often called a Turkish bath by Westerners, is a type of steam bath or a place of public bathing associated with the Islamic world. It is a prominent feature in the culture of the Muslim world and was inherited from the model of the Roman thermae. Muslim bathhouses or hammams were historically found across the Middle East, North Africa, Central Asia, and the Indian subcontinent, as well as Southeastern Europe (former Ottoman territories), and the Iberian Peninsula (former al-Andalus).

In Islamic cultures the significance of the hammam was both religious and civic: it provided for the needs of ritual ablutions but also provided for general hygiene in an era before private plumbing and served other social functions such as offering a gendered meeting place for men and for women. Archeological remains attest to the existence of bathhouses in the Islamic world as early as the Umayyad period (7th–8th centuries) and their importance has persisted up to modern times. Their architecture evolved from the layout of Roman and Greek bathhouses and featured a regular sequence of rooms: an undressing room, a cold room, a warm room, and a hot room. Heat was produced by furnaces which provided hot water and steam, while smoke and hot air was channeled through conduits under the floor.

In a modern hammam visitors undress themselves, while retaining some sort of modesty garment or loincloth, and proceed into progressively hotter rooms, inducing perspiration. They are then usually washed by male or female staff (matching the sex of the visitor) with the use of soap and vigorous rubbing, before ending by washing themselves in warm water. Unlike in Roman or Greek baths, bathers usually wash themselves with running water instead of immersing themselves in standing water since this is a requirement of Islam, though immersion in a pool used to be customary in the hammams of some regions such as Iran. While hammams everywhere generally operate in fairly similar ways, there are some regional differences both in usage and architecture.

== Etymology ==
The word "hammam" (حَمَّام) is a noun meaning "bath", "bathroom", "bathhouse", "swimming pool", etc. derived from the Arabic triconsonantal root H-M-M (ح م م) which yields meanings related to heat or heating. From Arabic حمّام, it passed on to Persian (حمام) and Turkish (hamam).

In English, the usage of the term 'Turkish baths' for hammams is due to earlier Western travel writers who visited the Ottoman Empire and then popularised the hammam in Europe as something essentially Turkish. Western writers also used the word 'Turk' since the 16th century to refer to Muslims generally, regardless of ethnicity. The Ottomans themselves would not have used a term like 'Turkish baths' because, until the rise of Turkish nationalism in the 19th century, they considered the word 'Turk' derogatory. According to scholar Nina Macaraig: "The term 'Turkish Bath', therefore is problematic: if used in the travel writers' sense, it is Orientalist; if used in an ethnic or nationalist sense, it projects a nineteenth-century concept back into previous centuries." The term can be best understood as using "Turkish" to mean something exotic from the East, as some cultures used a derivation of "Frankish" such as Farang to refer to all things exotic from the West. The first recorded use of the term 'Turkish bath' in English was in 1644.

== History ==
=== Origins and early development ===
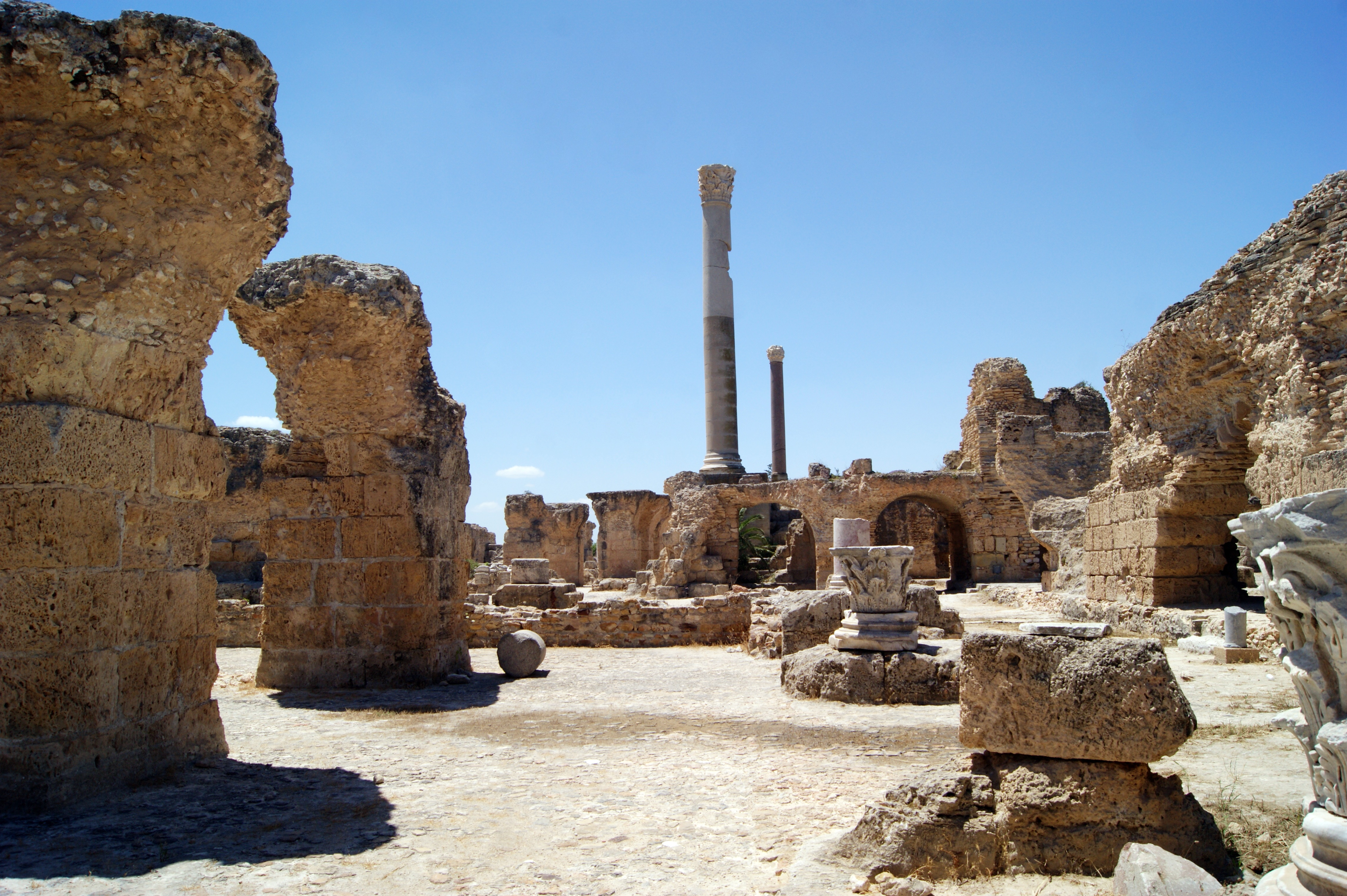
Remains of the Antonine Baths in ancient Carthage, from the Roman period, in present-day Tunisia

Public bathhouses were a prominent civic and urban institution in Roman and Hellenistic culture and were found throughout the Mediterranean world. They remained important in the cities of the early Byzantine Empire up to around the mid-6th century, after which the construction of new bathhouses declined and existing ones were gradually abandoned.

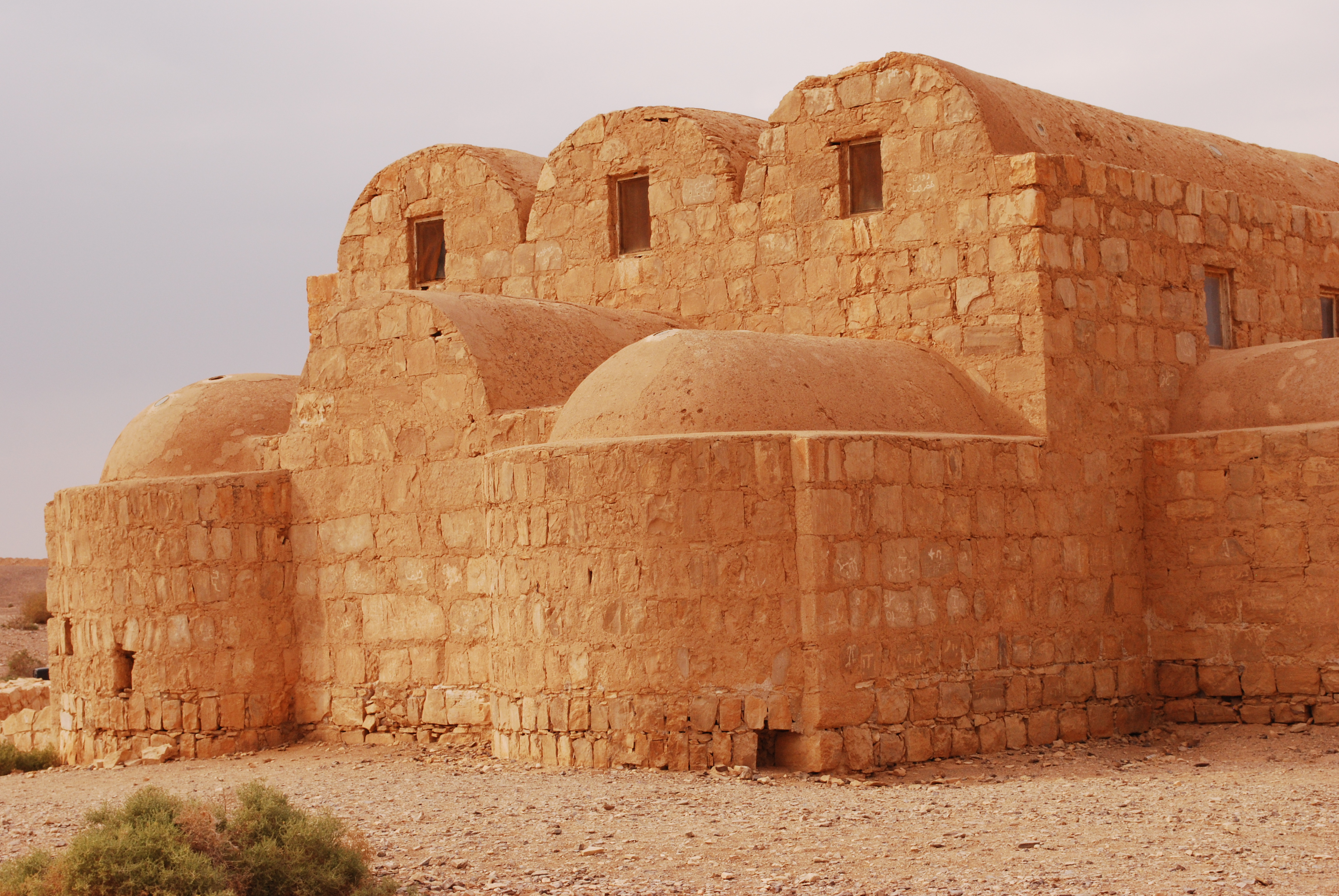
Qusayr 'Amra in Jordan, among the earliest known examples of Islamic bathhouses, dating from the Umayyad period (7th–8th century)

Following the expansion of Arab Muslim rule over much of the Middle East and North Africa in the 7th and 8th centuries, the emerging Islamic societies were quick to adapt the bathhouse to their own needs. Its importance to Muslim society lay in the religious requirement to perform ablutions (wudu and ghusl) before praying and because of the general Islamic emphasis on physical and spiritual purity, although the scholar Mohammed Hocine Benkheira has argued that hammams were not in fact necessary for religious purposes in early Islam and that this relationship was partly assumed by later historians. He suggests that the hammam's initial appeal derived at least in part from its convenience for other services (such as shaving), from its endorsement by some Muslim doctors as a form of therapy, and from the continued popular appreciation of its pleasures in a region where they had already existed for centuries. He also notes that there was initially strong opposition from many Islamic scholars (ulama), especially Maliki scholars, to the use of hammams. These scholars viewed hammams as unnecessary for full-body ablutions (ghusl) and questioned whether public bathing spaces could be sufficiently clean to achieve proper purification. They also worried that spaces for collective bathing could become spaces for illicit sexual activity. Nevertheless, this opposition progressively faded and by the 9th century most scholars were no longer interested in debating the validity of hammams, although it continued to be seen with suspicion in some conservative circles.

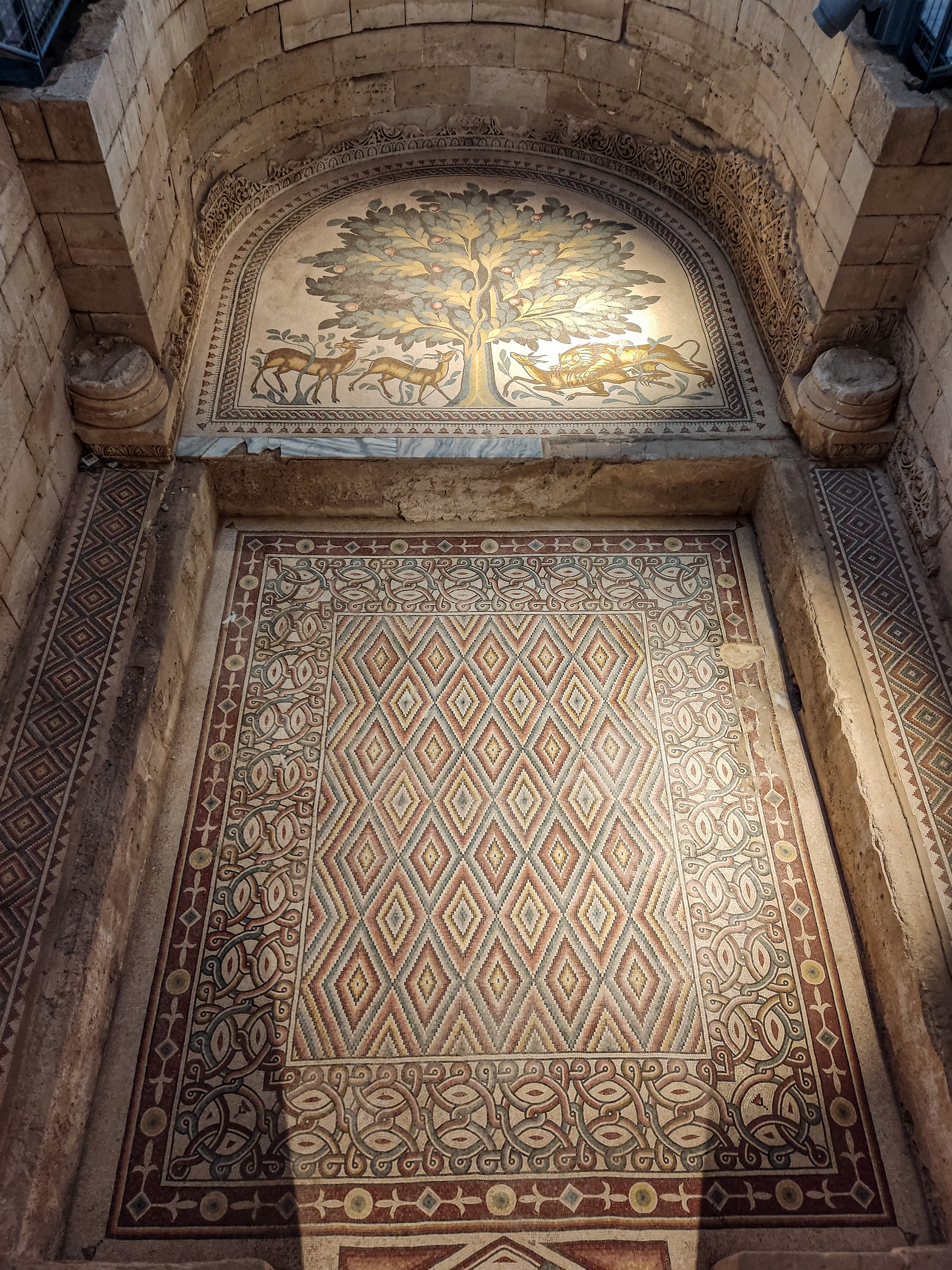
The "Tree of Life" mosaic in a reception room of the bathhouse at Khirbat al-Majfar, a 7th- or 8th-century Umayyad-era archeological site in Jericho, Palestine

The earliest known Islamic hammams were built in Syria and Jordan during the Umayyad Caliphate (661–750) as part of palaces and desert castles at Qusayr 'Amra, Hammam al-Sarah, Qasr al-Hayr al-Sharqi, and Khirbat al-Majfar. Shortly after this period, archaeology reveals the existence of Islamic bathhouses across much of the Muslim world, with hammams appearing as far west as Volubilis (itself a former Roman colony) in Morocco during the Idrisid period (late 8th to early 9th centuries). Historical texts and archeological evidence also indicate the existence of hammams in Cordoba and other cities of al-Andalus in the 8th century. In Iran, which did not previously have a strong culture of public bathing, historical texts mention the existence of bathhouses in the 10th century as well as the use of hot springs for therapeutic purposes; however, there has been relatively little archeological investigation to document the early presence and development of hammams in this region.

Muslims retained many of the main elements of the classical bathhouses while leaving out functions which were less relevant to their practices. For example, the progression from cold room to hot room was maintained, but it was no longer common practice to take a plunge in cold water after leaving the hot room, nor was exercise incorporated into bathing culture as it was in classical gymnasiums. Likewise, Muslim bathers usually washed themselves in running water rather than immersing themselves in standing water. Although in early Islamic history women did not normally patronise hammams, by around the 10th century many places started to provide separate hours (or separate facilities) for men and women. The hammam then took on an important role in women's social life as one of the few public spaces where they could gather and socialise apart from men. Some hammams were privately owned or formed parts of palaces and mansions, but in many cases they were civic or charitable institutions which formed part of larger religious/civic complexes. Such complexes were governed by waqf agreements, and hammams often acted as a source of revenue for the upkeep of other institutions such as mosques.

=== Later Islamic baths ===
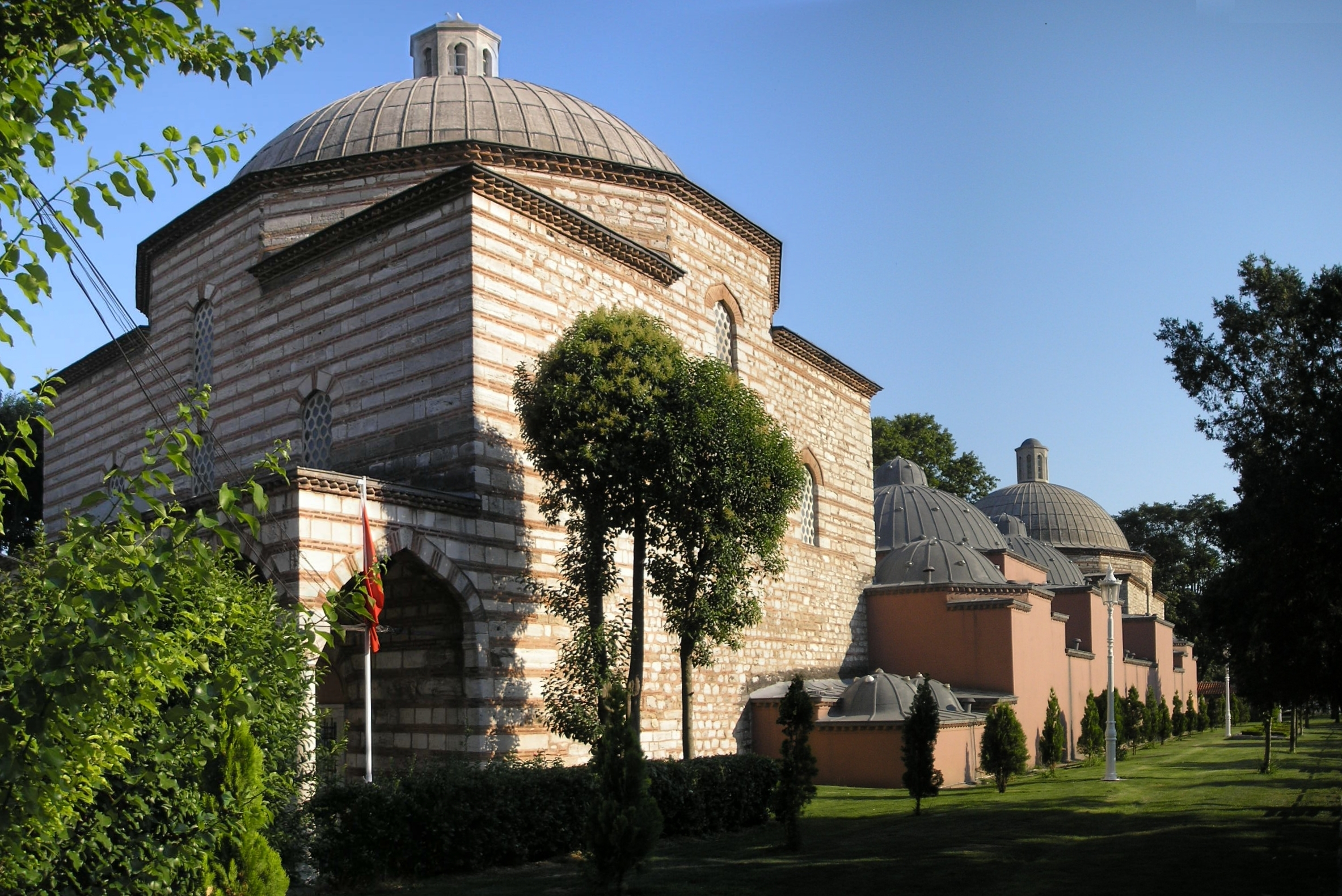
Haseki Hürrem Sultan Bathhouse in Istanbul, Turkey, commissioned by Roxelana and designed by Mimar Sinan (16th century)

In the 11th century, the Seljuk Empire conquered much of Anatolia from the Byzantine Empire, eventually leading to the complete conquest of the remnants of the old empire by the Ottomans in the 15th century. During those centuries of war, peace, alliance, trade and competition, these intermixing cultures (Eastern Roman, Islamic Persian and Turkic) had tremendous influence on each other.

The later Ottomans became prolific patrons of hammams. Since they were social centres as well as baths, they were built in almost every city across their European, Asian, and African territories. The Ottomans were thus responsible for introducing hammams to much of eastern and central Europe, where many still exist today in various states of restoration or disrepair. Such baths are found as far as Bosnia and Herzegovina, Greece, and Hungary. Many early Ottoman hammams survive in Bursa and Edirne, as well as in Eastern Europe and Anatolia, but hammams became even more numerous and architecturally ambitious in Constantinople (Istanbul), thanks to its royal patronage, its large population and its access to plentiful water. The city's Greek inhabitants had retained a strong Eastern Roman bath culture, with the Baths of Zeuxippus constituting one early example. Ottoman architects expanded on the experience of Byzantine architects to create particularly well-balanced designs with greater symmetry and regularity in the arrangement of space than could be seen in hammams in other parts of the Muslim world. Some of the city's oldest monumental hammams are the Tahtakale Hamam (probably built right after 1454), the Mahmut Pasha Hamam (built in 1466), and the Bayezid II Hamam (built some time between 1500 and 1507). The monumental hammams designed by the 16th-century Ottoman architect Mimar Sinan (1489–1588), such as the Çemberlitaş Hamamı, the Süleymaniye Hamam (in the complex of the Süleymaniye Mosque), and the Haseki Hürrem Sultan Hamam, are major examples of hammams that were built later in the era of classical Ottoman architecture. When Sultan Mustafa III issued a decree halting the construction of new public baths in the city in 1768, it seems to have resulted in an increase in the number of private hammams among the wealthy and the elites, especially in the Bosphorus suburbs where they built luxurious summer homes.

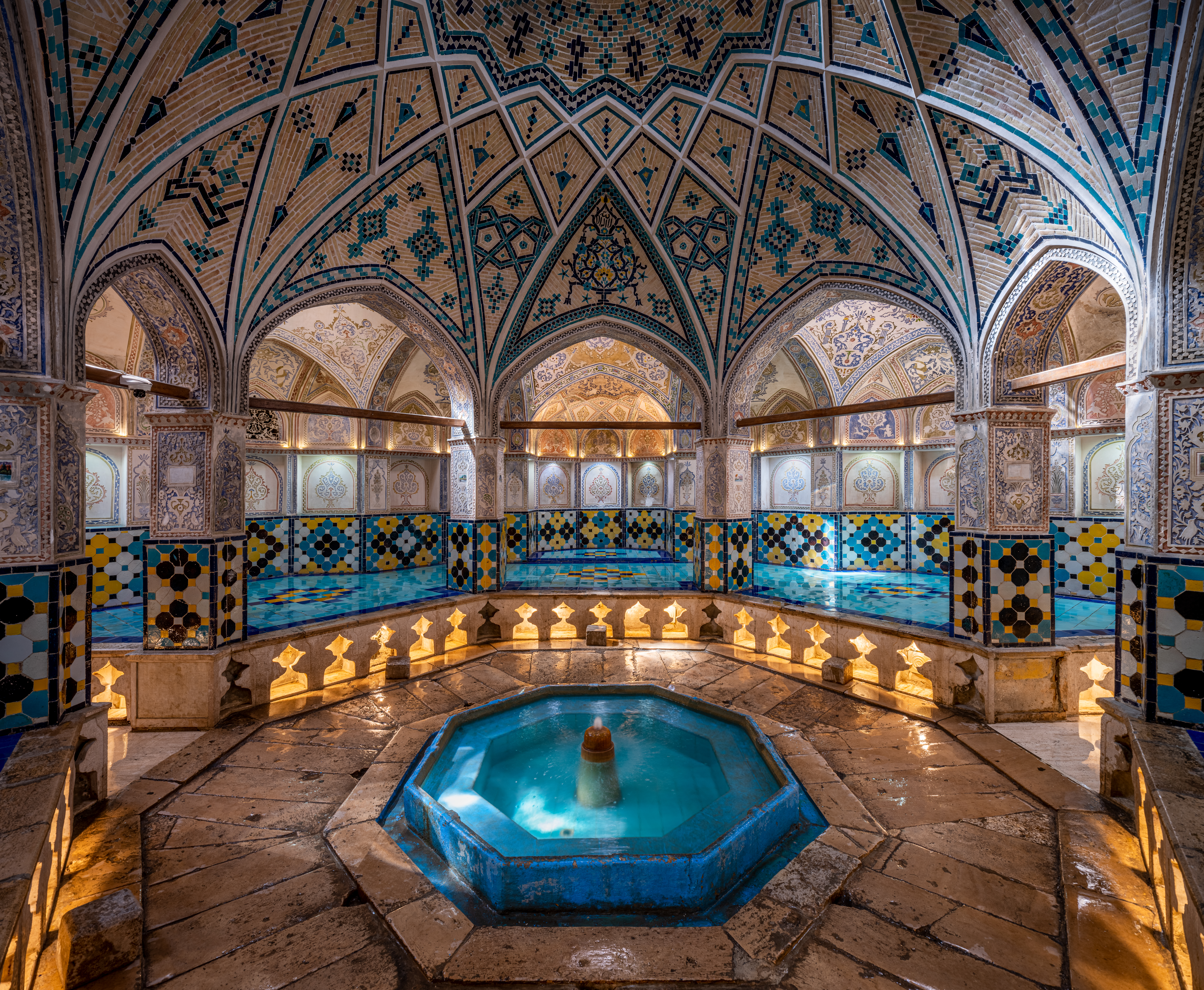
16th-century Sultan Amir Ahmad Bathhouse in Kashan, Iran. Part of it is now used as a teahouse.

In Iran, many examples of hammams survive from the Safavid period (16th–18th centuries) onward, with the historic city of Isfahan in particular containing many examples. The spread of Muslim rule in the Indian subcontinent also introduced hammams to this region, with many examples surviving in Mughal architecture (16th–19th centuries).

=== Contemporary era ===
Hammams continued to be a vital part of urban life in the Muslim world until the early 20th century, when the spread of indoor plumbing in private homes rendered public baths unnecessary for personal hygiene. This has resulted in a decline in their use – although to varying degrees depending on regional cultural practices. In many regions, hammams have been abandoned, demolished, or converted to serve as commercial buildings or cultural venues. Some have been converted into museums or art galleries, as with the examples of the Bayezid II Hamam in Istanbul, which now houses a hammam museum, and the Davud Pasha (or Daut Pasha) Hamam in Skopje, North Macedonia.

In Turkey, many historic hammams continue to operate either for locals or for tourists; in some cases, this has led to neglected historic hammams such as the Kılıç Ali Pasa Hamamı and the Hürrem Sultan Hamamı being renovated and returned to their original function, while others were abandoned or repurposed. In Morocco, many hammams continue to serve locals in historic cities such as Fez and Marrakesh, where they are especially useful to the urban poor residing in the old cities (medinas). In many other regions, however, hammams have become obsolete and have either been abandoned or converted to other uses. In Iran, some baths continue to operate in the historic districts of cities like Isfahan where they continue to serve religious functions, but there is an overall decline in their numbers. Many surviving Iranian examples have been converted to other uses, most notably as restaurants and teahouses. In Damascus, Syria, only thirteen hammams were still operating in 2004, mostly in the old city; many others had been either demolished or repurposed. In Cairo, Egypt, an estimated 77 hammams were operational at the beginning of the 19th century but only eight were still in business by the start of the 21st century, with many others abandoned or neglected. In the former European territories of the Ottoman Empire, such as Greece and the Balkans, many hammams became defunct or were neglected in modern times, although some have now been restored and turned into historic monuments or cultural centres.

== Public bathing in the Islamic context ==
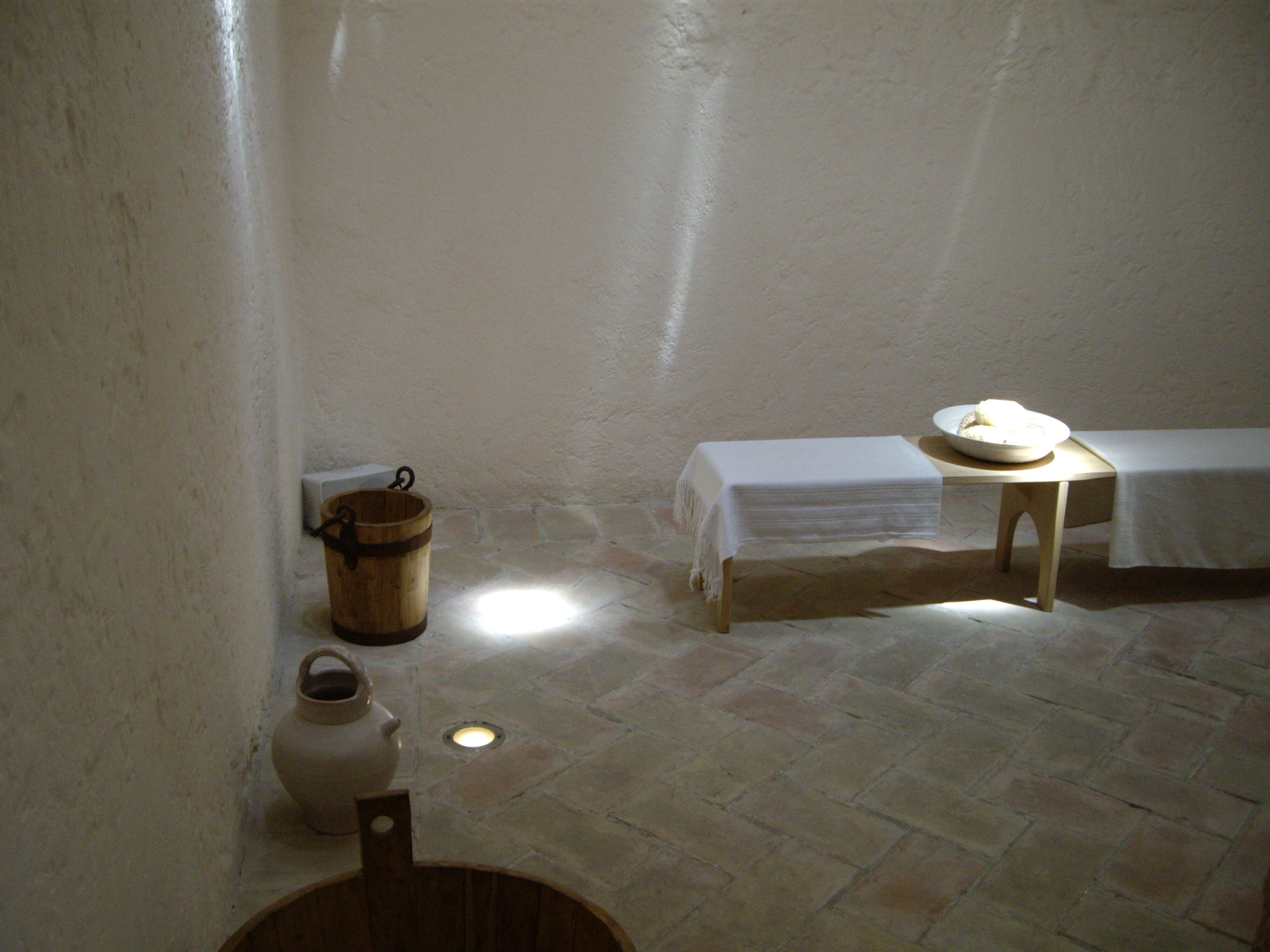
Hammam interior, showing water buckets and tilted floor (Baños del Almirante, Valencia)

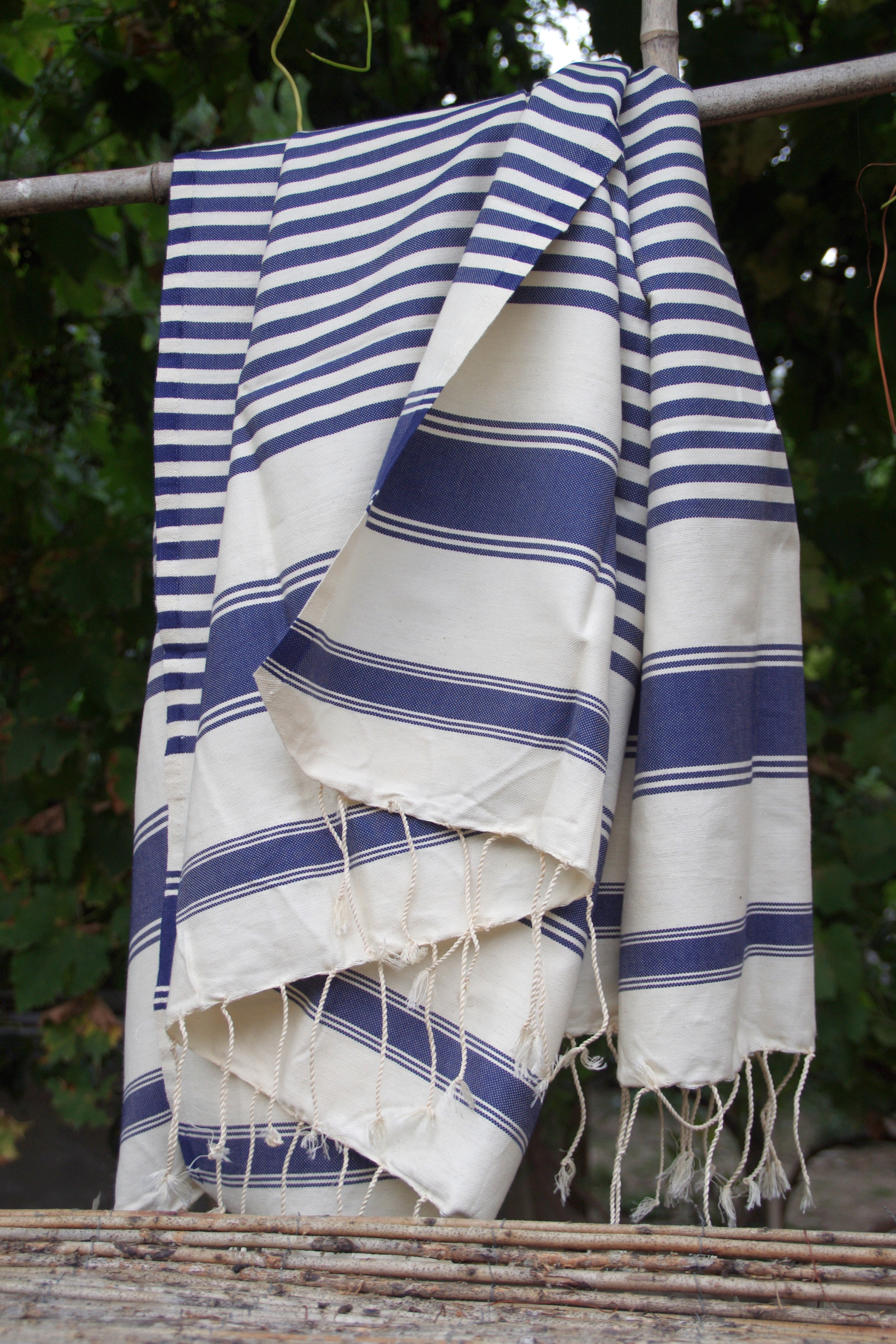
A Peshtemal, hammam towel

Prayer is one of the Five Pillars of Islam and it is customary to perform ablutions before praying. The two Islamic forms of ablution are ghusl, a full-body cleansing, and wudu, a cleansing of the face, hands, and feet. Mosques always provide a place to wash, but hammams are often located nearby for deeper cleansing. Many are actually part of mosque complexes.

Hammams, particularly in Morocco, evolved from their Roman origins to meet the needs of ritual purification according to Islam. For example, in most Roman-style hammams, there was a cold pool for submersion of the body, a style of bathing that finds less favour with Islam which regards bathing under running water without being fully submerged more appropriate.

Al-Ghazali, a prominent Muslim theologian of the 11th century, wrote Revival of the Religious Sciences, a multi-volume work discussing the appropriate forms of conduct for many aspects of Muslim life and death. One of the volumes, entitled The Mysteries of Purity, details the proper technique for performing ablutions before prayer and the major ablution (ghusil) after anything which renders it necessary, such as the emission of semen. For al-Ghazali, the hammam is a primarily male institution, and he cautions that women should only enter a hammam after childbirth or illness. However, even al-Ghazali thought it admissible for men to prohibit their wives or sisters from using the hammam. For al-Ghazali the main point of contention surrounding hammams was nakedness, and he warned that overt nakedness was to be avoided ("… he should shield it from the sight of others and second, guard against the touch of others.") His writing focused especially on the need to avoid touching the penis during bathing and after urination, and wrote that nakedness was decent only when the area between a man's knees and lower stomach was hidden. For women he suggested that only exposure of the face and palms was appropriate. According to al-Ghazali, nakedness in the hammam could incite indecent thoughts and behaviours, hence its controversial nature.

In Islam ritual ablution is also required before or after sexual intercourse. Knowing that, May Telmissany, a professor at the University of Ottawa, argues that the image of a hyper-sexualised woman leaving the hammam is an Orientalist way of looking at things that sees leaving or attending the hammam as an indicator of sexual behaviour.

== Bathing practices and services ==
Most hammams expect their clients to undress down to a modesty garment or loincloth, before proceeding from a cold room to progressively hotter rooms. Men are usually washed by male bath attendants and women by female attendants before they are given a massage. Some details of the process vary from region to region, such as the presence or absence of pools where visitors can immerse themselves in water. In more conservative areas women are less likely to bathe in just their underwear while in areas where hammams have become the preserve mainly of tourists there is more likelihood that women will bathe naked. Some hammam complexes contain separate sections for men and women; elsewhere men and women are admitted at different times in which case the hours for women are usually far more limited than those for men.

Traditionally hammams, especially those for women, doubled as places of entertainment with dancing and food being shared. It was common to visit hammams before weddings or religious holidays, to celebrate births, to swap beauty tips, etc. Women also used visits to the hammam to size up potential wives for their sons.

Some accessories from Roman times survive in modern hammams, such as the peştemal (a special cloth of silk and/or cotton to cover the body, like a pareo) and the kese (a rough mitten used for scrubbing). However, other accoutrements of the hammam experience such as jewel boxes, gilded soap boxes, mirrors, metal henna bowls, perfume bottles and nalın (wooden or mother-of-pearl clogs that prevented slipping on the wet floor) can now only be seen in museums.

Traditionally, the bathhouse masseurs (Turkish: tellak) were young men who soaped and scrubbed their clients. However, the tellaks were replaced by adult attendants during the 20th century.

=== Massage ===
A massage in a hammam is likely to involve not just vigorous muscle kneading, but also joint cracking—"not so much a tender working of the flesh as a pummelling, a cracking of joints, a twisting of limbs". Hammams aiming for a tourist clientele are likely to also offer an array of different types of massage similar to what might be offered in a spa.

== Social function: gendered social space ==
Arab hammams are gendered spaces where being a woman or a man can make someone included or excluded. Therefore, they represent a departure from the public sphere in which one is physically exposed amongst other women or men. This declaration of sexuality merely by being nude makes hammams a site of gendered expression. One exception to this gender segregation is the presence of young boys who often accompany their mothers until they reach the age of five or six when they switch to attending the male hammam with their fathers.

Women's hammams play a special role in society. Valerie Staats finds that the women's hammams of Morocco serve as a social space where traditional and modern women from urban and rural areas of the country come together, regardless of their religiosity, to bathe and socialise. The bathing regulations laid down by al-Ghazali and other Islamic intellectuals are not usually upheld in the everyday interactions of Moroccans in the hammam. Staats argues that hammams are places where women can feel more at ease than in many other public interactions. In addition, in his work Sexuality in Islam, Abdelwahab Bouhdiba cites the hammam as a place where homosexual encounters in general can take place. He notes that some historians found evidence of hammams as spaces for sexual expression among women, which they believed was a result of the universality of nudity in these spaces. Hammams have also been associated with male homosexuality over the centuries and up to the present day.

== Architecture ==
=== General design ===
The hammam combines the functionality and structural elements of the Roman thermae with the Islamic tradition of steam bathing, ritual cleansing and respect for water. Islamic bathhouses were often constructed as a part of mosque complexes which acted as both community centres and places of worship.

Although there were variations across different regions and periods, the general plan and architectural principles of hammams were very similar. They consisted of a sequence of rooms which bathers visited in the same order: the changing room or undressing room (corresponding to the Roman apodyterium), the cold room (like the Roman frigidarium), the warm room (like the tepidarium), and the hot room (like the caldarium). The nomenclature for these different rooms varied from region to region. The changing room was known generally as al-mashlaḥ or al-maslakh in Arabic, or by local vernacular terms like goulsa in Fez (Morocco) and maḥras in Tunisia, whereas it was known as the camekân in Turkish and the sarbineh in Persian. The cold room was known as the bayt al-barid in al-Andalus, el-barrani in Fez, bayt awwal in Cairo, and soğukluk in Turkish. The warm room or intermediate room was known as bayt al-wastani in al-Andalus and many other regions, as el-wasti in Fez, as bīt əs-skhūn in Tunis, and as ılıklık in Turkish. The hot room was called the bayt al-sakhun in al-Andalus, ad-dakhli in Fez, harara in Cairo, garmkhaneh in Persian, and hararet or sıcaklık in Turkish.

The main chambers of the hammam were usually covered with vaulted or domed ceilings, giving them a distinctive profile. The domes and vaults of the steam rooms (especially the hot room) were usually pierced with small holes or skylights which provided natural light during the day while allowing excess steam to escape. The ceiling and walls were clad with steam-proof materials such as varnished plaster or (for the lower walls and floors) marble. The vestibule, or changing room, was often one of the most highly decorated chambers, featuring a central fountain surrounded by benches. In Ottoman baths, the main changing room often offered multi-level wooden galleries giving access to smaller changing rooms. Toilets or latrines were often included in the complex.

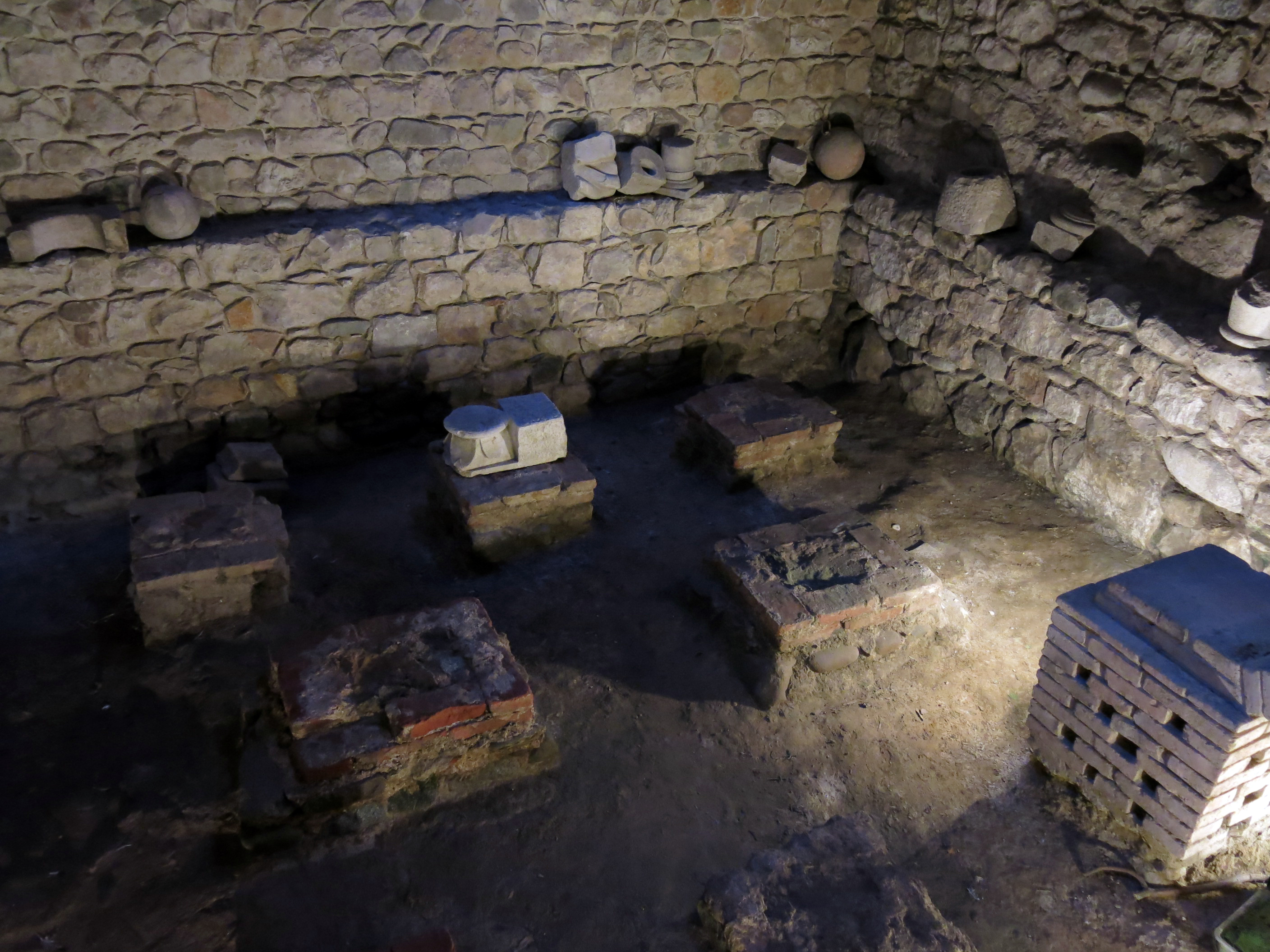
Remains of the hypocaust in the caldarium (hot room) of the Arab baths in Girona, Spain (late 12th-century)

Most historic hammams made use of some version or derivation of the Roman hypocaust underfloor system for heating. A furnace or set of furnaces were located in a service room behind the walls of the hot room and set at a lower level than the steam rooms. The furnaces were used to heat water (usually in a large cauldron above them) which was then delivered to the steam rooms. At the same time, hot air and smoke from the furnaces was channeled through pipes or conduits under the floor of the steam rooms, thus heating the rooms, before rising through the walls and out the chimneys. As hot water was constantly needed, they were kept burning throughout the hours of operation. Although wood was continuously needed for fuel, some hammams, such as those in Morocco, Turkey and Damascus, also made use of recycled organic materials from other industries such as wood shavings from carpenters' workshops and olive pits from the olive presses.

Some hammams were "double" hammams, having separate facilities for women and men. Several of Istanbul's larger hammams were like this, including the Bayezid II Hamam and the Haseki Hürrem Sultan Hamam. Unusually for Morocco, the Hammam as-Saffarin in Fez is another example.

=== Variations ===
==== Maghreb and al-Andalus ====
Regional variations in hammam architecture usually relate to the relative proportions of each room or the absence of one type of room. In the Maghreb, and especially in al-Andalus, the largest and most important steam room was typically the warm room (al-wastani). The Arab Baths of Jaén is one of the more extreme examples of this since the warm room is as large as both the cold and hot rooms combined, possibly because it was also used for body massages and other services. The changing room was also fairly large and was typically the only space to feature any significant architectural decoration.

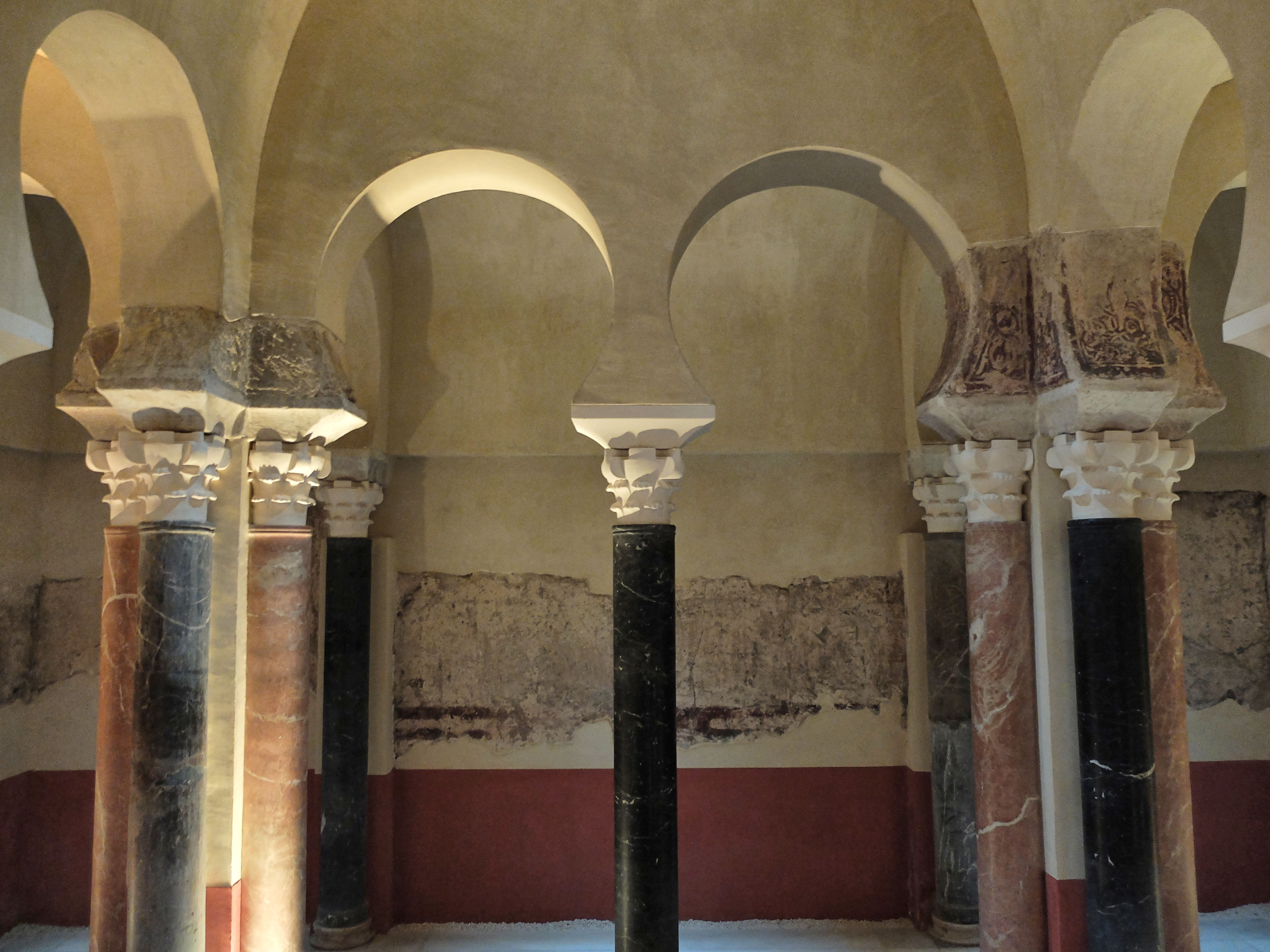
Reconstructed interior of the Caliphal Baths in Cordoba, Spain (10th century)

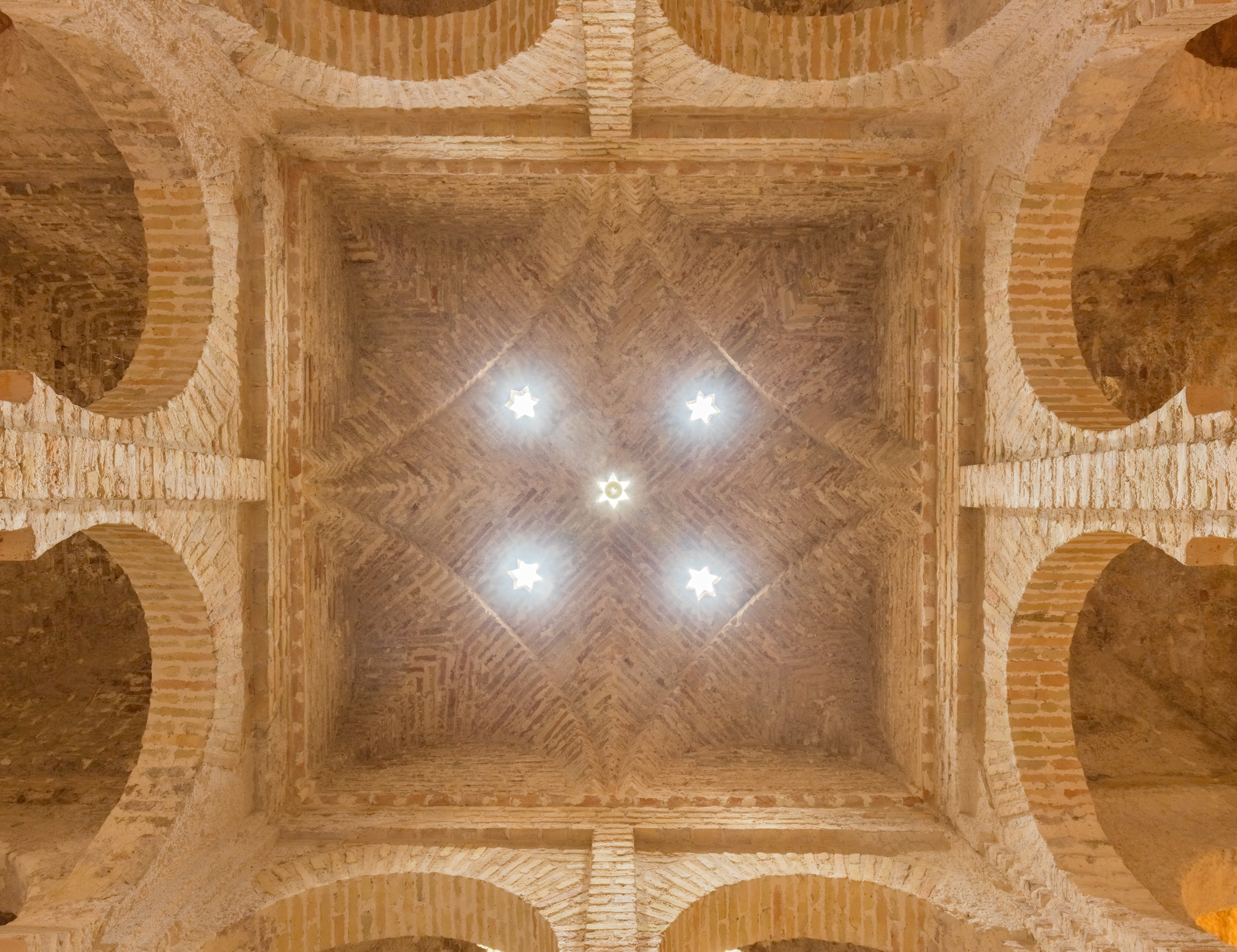
Vaulted ceiling of warm room in the hammam of the Almohad-era Alcázar of Jerez de la Frontera in Spain (12th century)

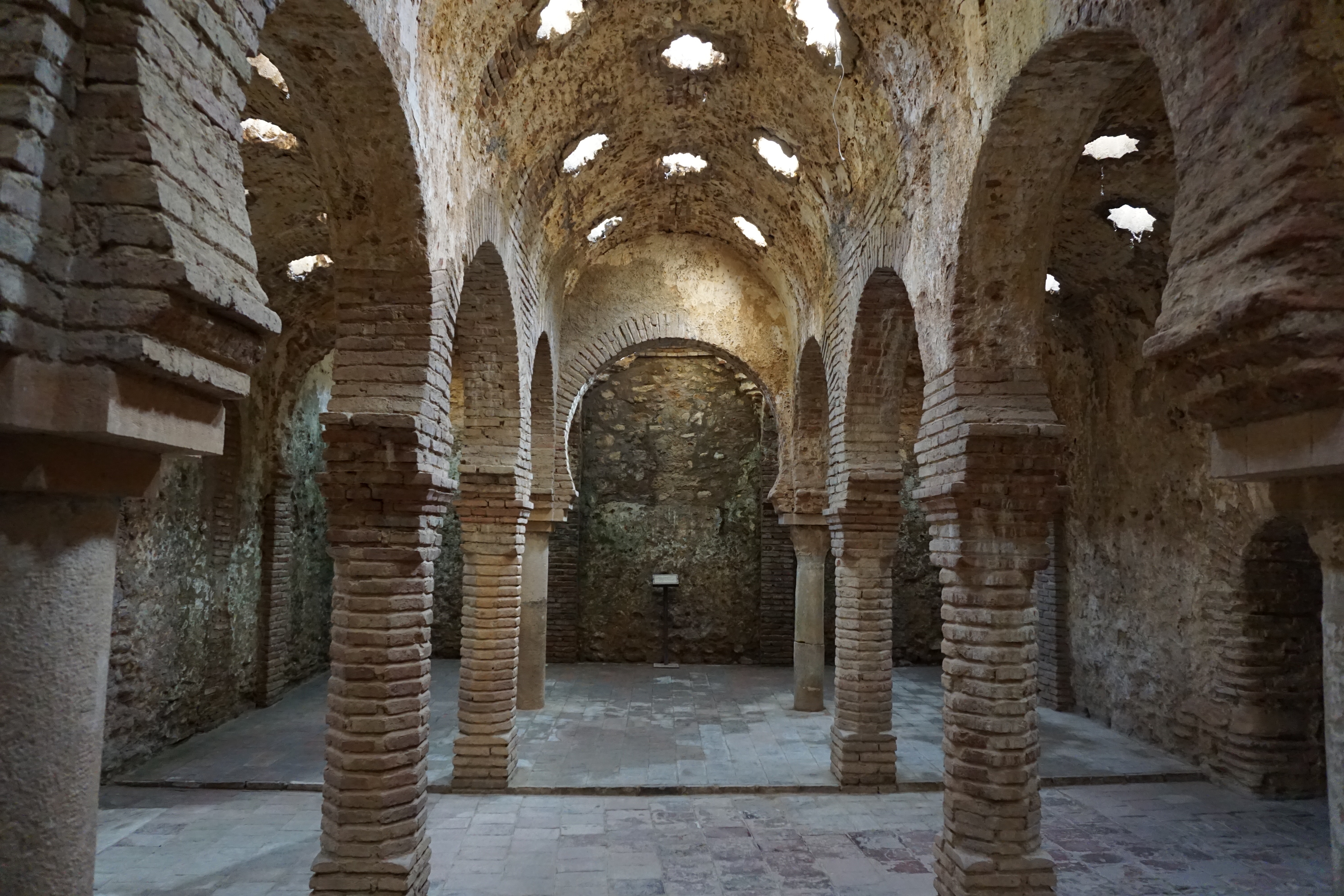
The warm room of the Arab baths (Baños Arabes) of Ronda, Spain, late 13th century

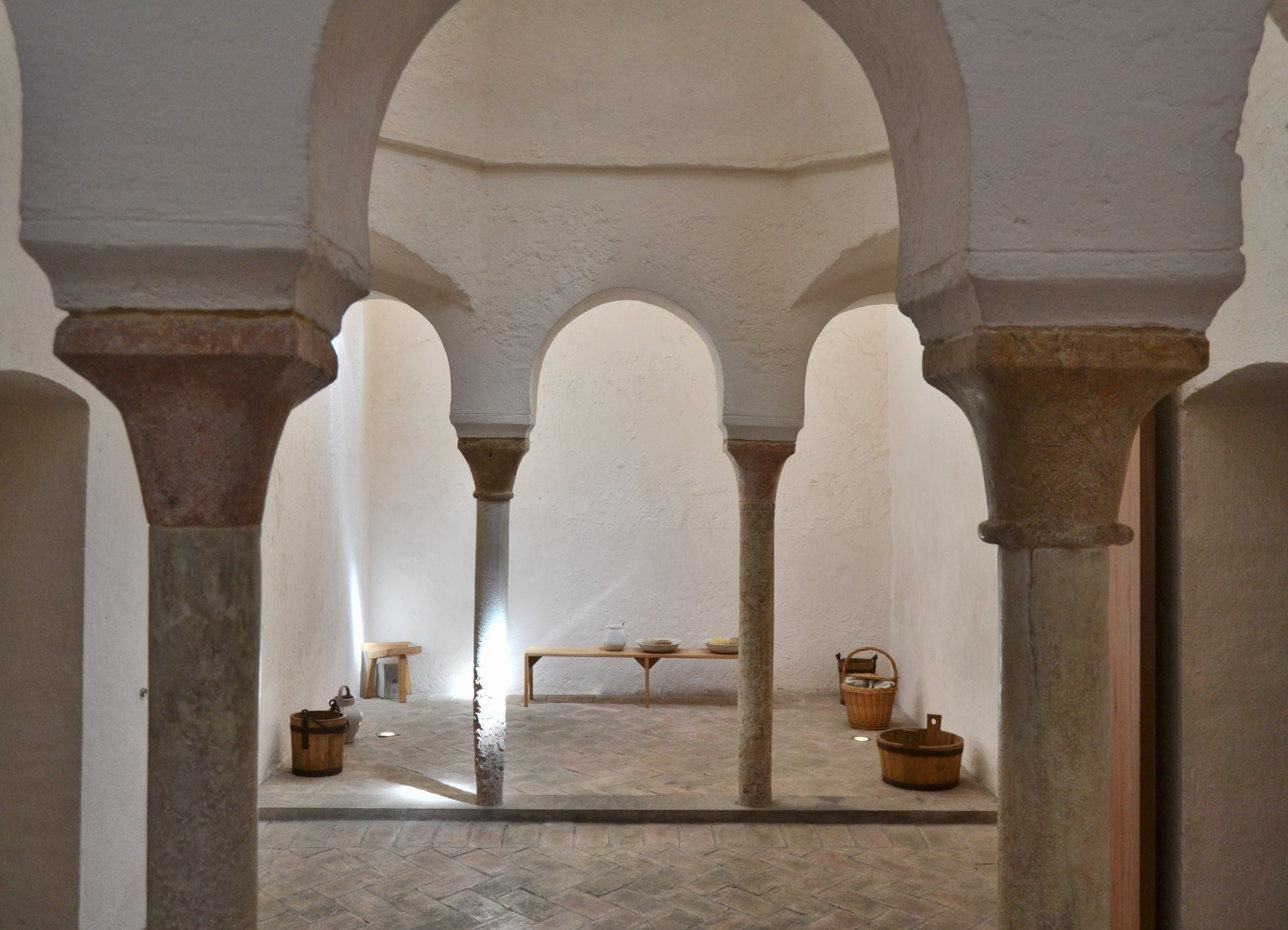
Room at the Baños del Almirante, a historic Andalusi bathhouse in Valencia, Spain (c. 1320)

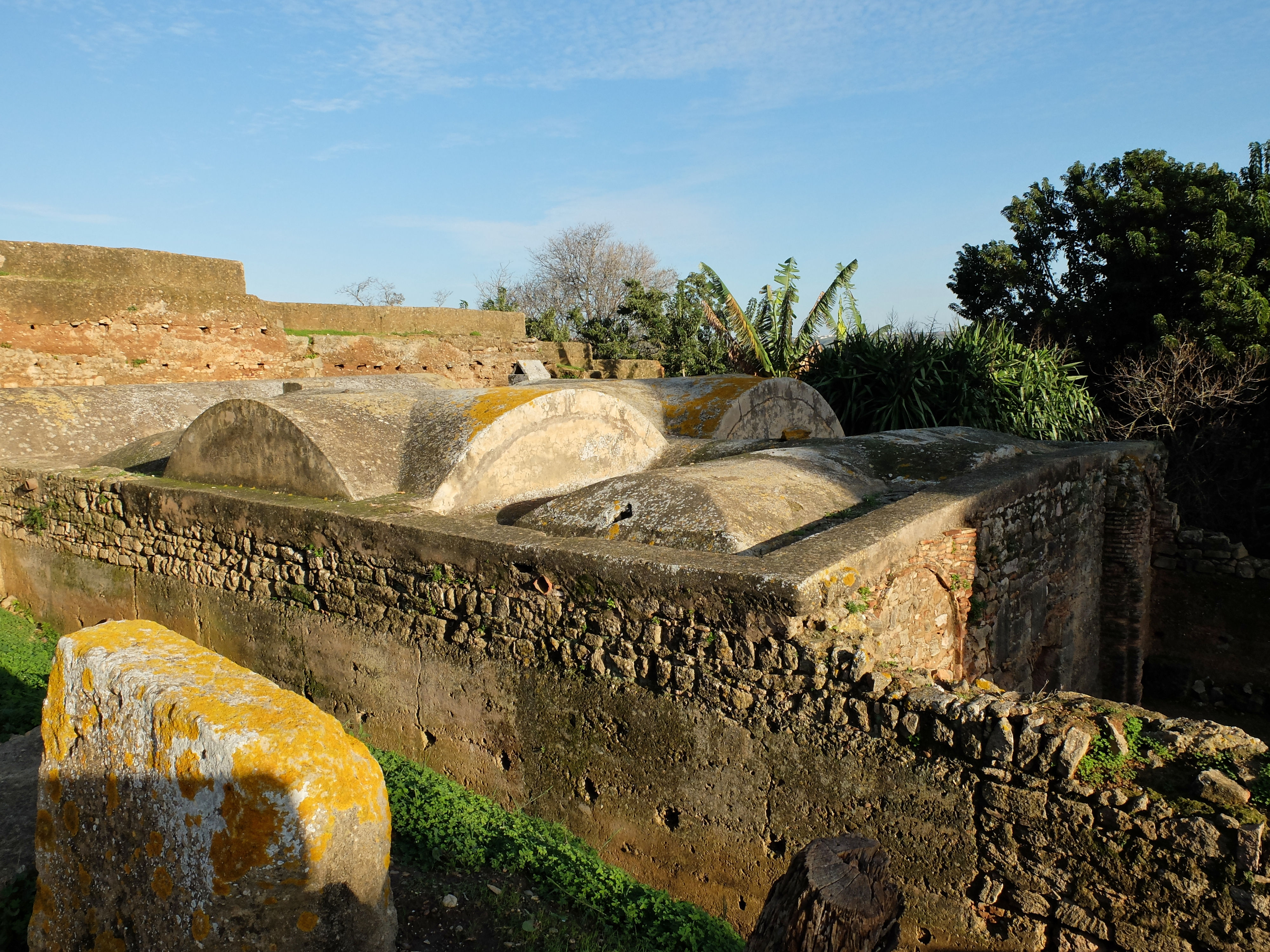
Marinid-era hammam at Chellah, Morocco (14th century)

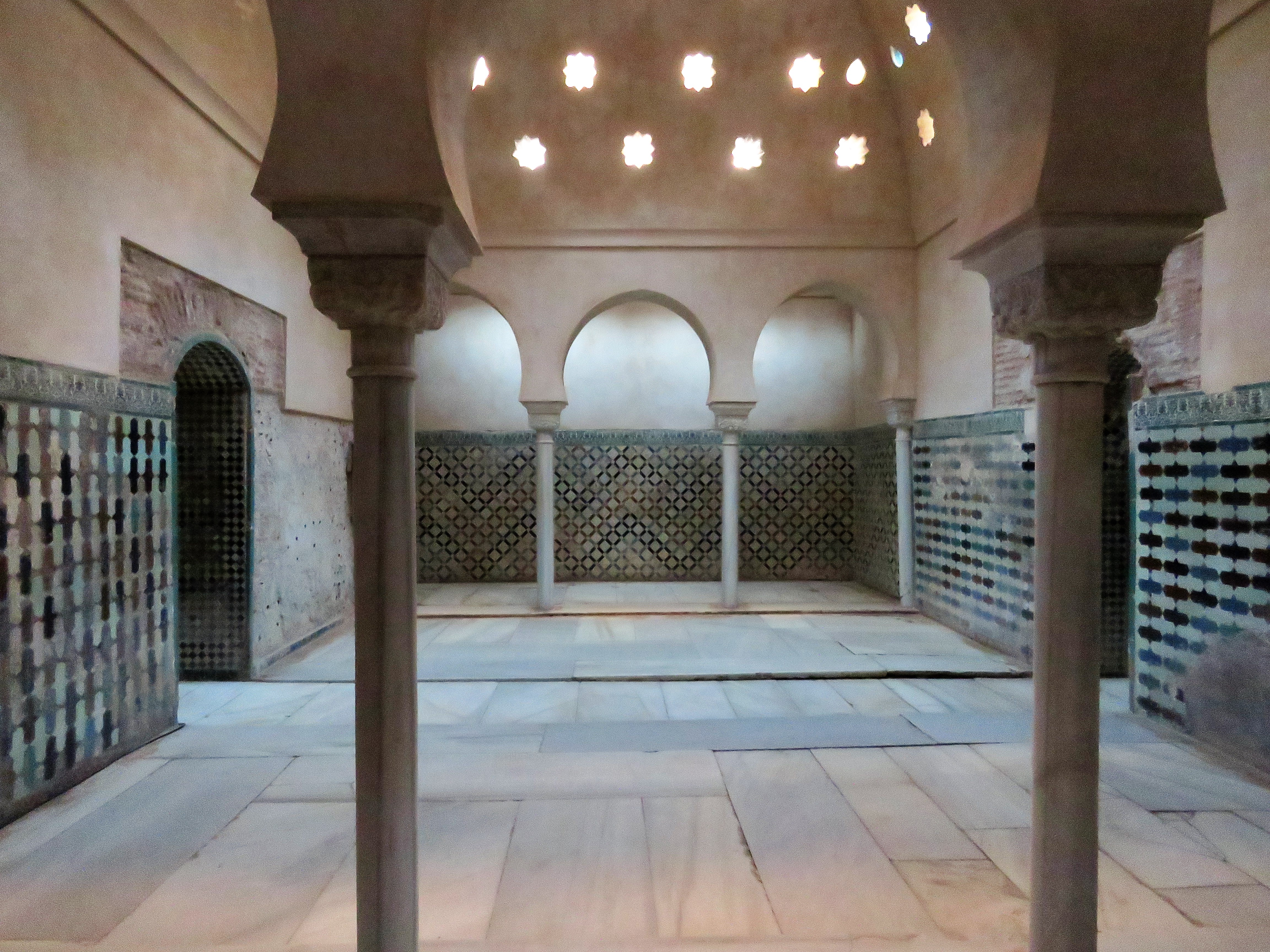
Warm room of the Nasrid-era Comares Baths at the Alhambra in Granada, Spain (14th century)

==== Ottoman baths ====
In Ottoman baths the cold room is often either omitted completely or combined with the changing room (known as the camekân or soyunmalık). This room is often the largest domed chamber in the complex, with the dome supported on squinches, "Turkish triangles", or decorative muqarnas. It usually features a central fountain (şadırvan) and is ringed with wooden galleries and is used as a place to relax, drink tea, coffee, or sherbet, and socialise before and after bathing. In contrast with hammams in al-Andalus or the Maghreb, the warm room (ılıklık) was de-emphasised architecturally and was sometimes little more than a transition space between the cold and hot rooms.

The hot room (hararet or sıcaklık) was usually the focus of the richest architectural embellishments. Its layout typically consisted of a central domed space flanked by up to four iwans to form a cruciform layout. The corners between these iwans are often occupied by smaller domed chambers, or halvets, which were used for private bathing. The center was usually occupied by a large heated marble table (göbektaşı or navel stone) for customers to lie on.

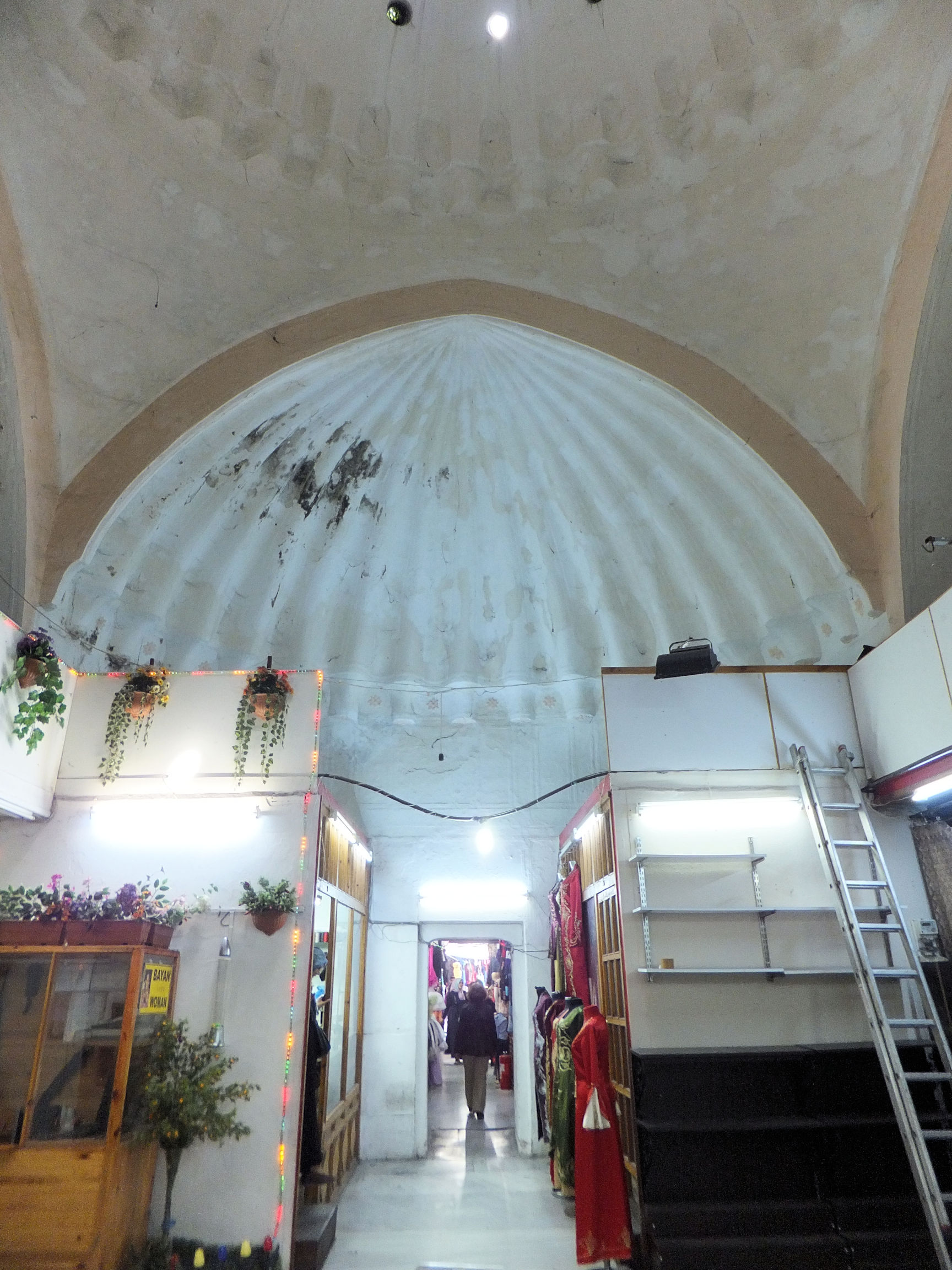
Interior of the Mahmut Pasha Hamam (now used for shops) in Istanbul, Turkey (1476)

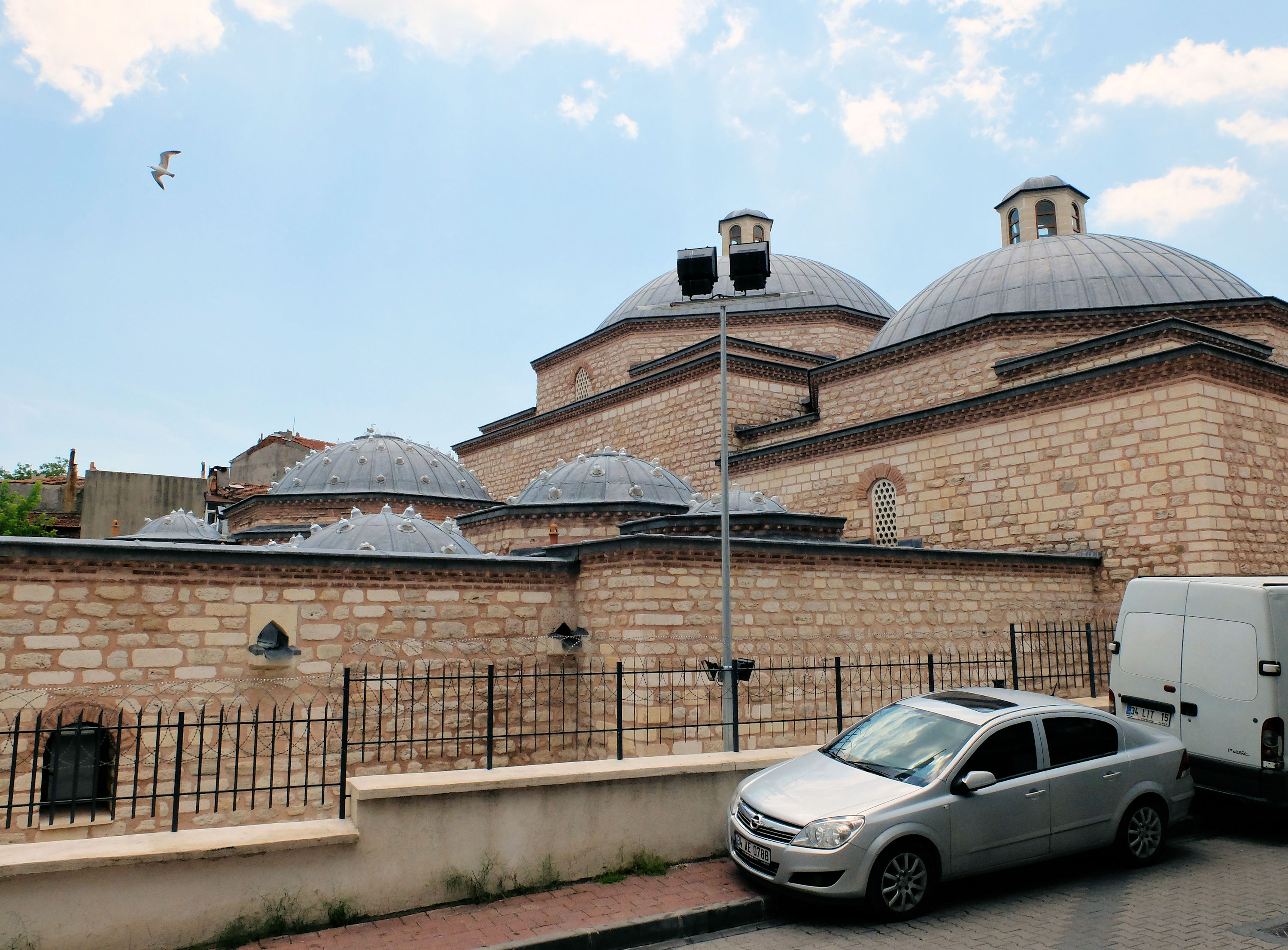
Küçük Mustafa Paşa Hamam in Istanbul (c. 1477)

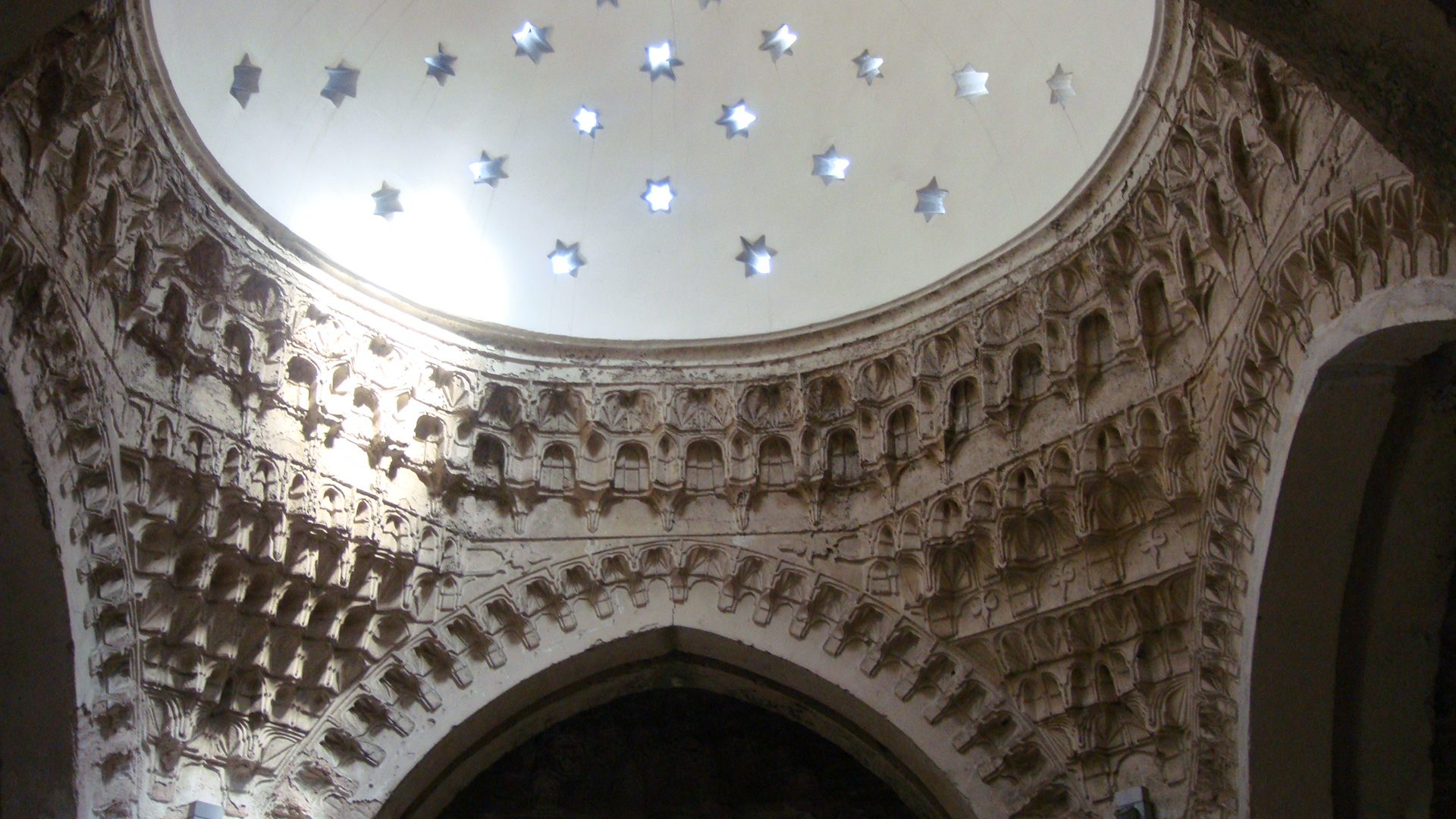
Muqarnas decoration around the domes of the Ottoman-era Davud Pasha Hamam in Skopje, North Macedonia (late 15th century)

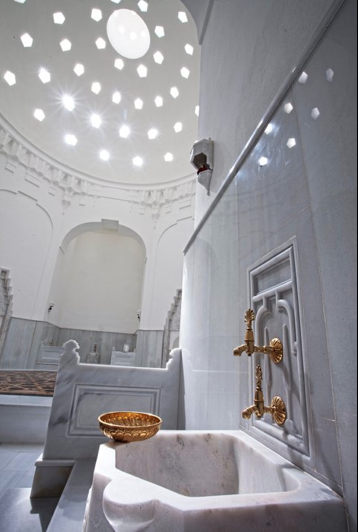
Renovated interior of the Haseki Hurrem Sultan Bathhouse in Istanbul (16th century)

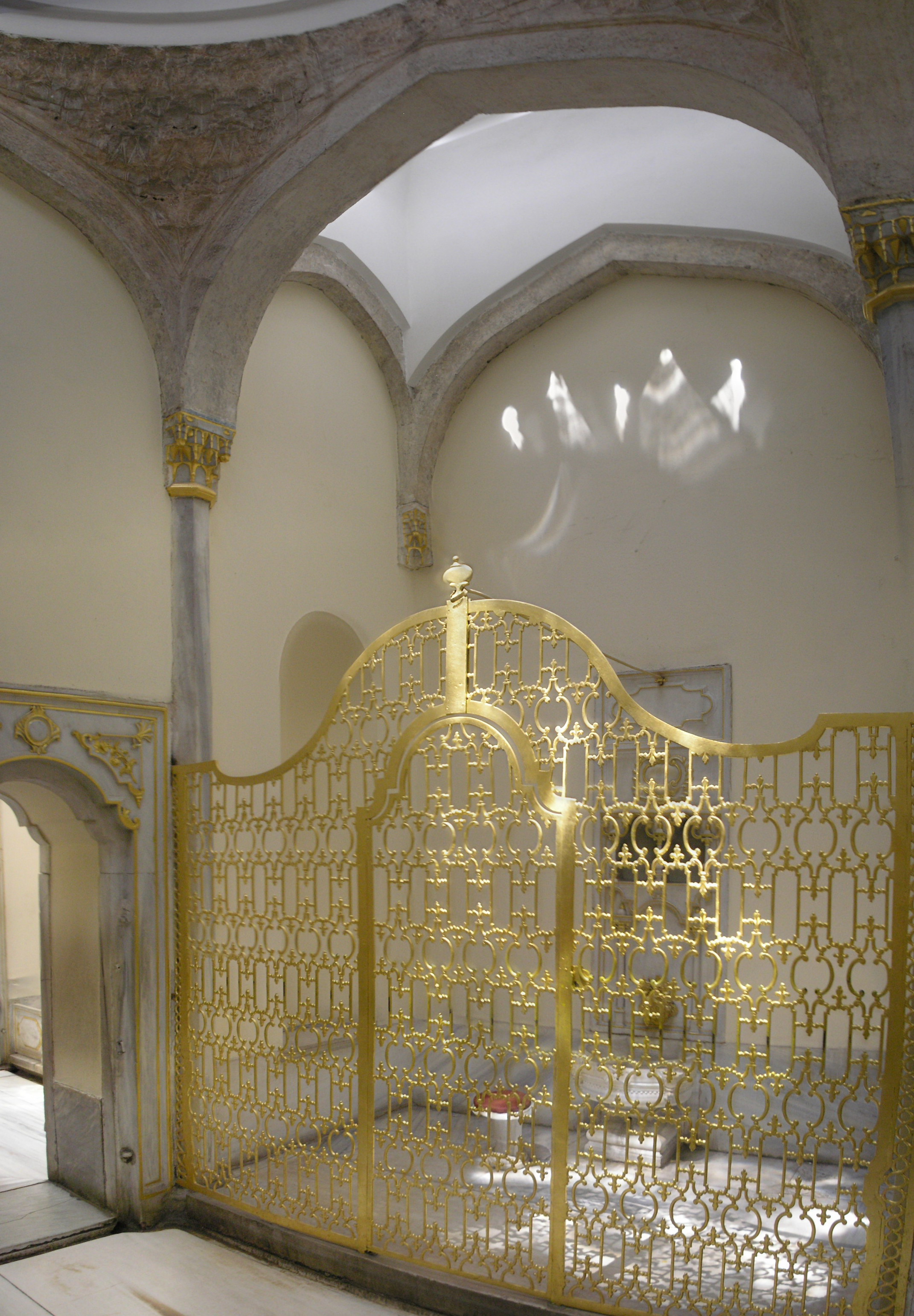
Baths of the Sultan and the Queen Mother at the Topkapı Palace in Istanbul (late 16th century)

==== Iran ====
In Iran a shared pool or basin of hot water is commonly present in the middle of the hot room where bathers could immerse themselves, a feature which was rare or absent in the hamams of other regions (except Egypt). Iranian hammam architecture was also characterised by the polyhedral shape of its rooms (sometimes rectangular but often octagonal or hexagonal), which were covered by a dome with a central skylight. The Iranian hot room (garmkhaneh) was in some cases divided into several rooms: a large main one with a central pool (chal howz) and smaller ones for individual ablutions or which could be used as private rooms for special guests.

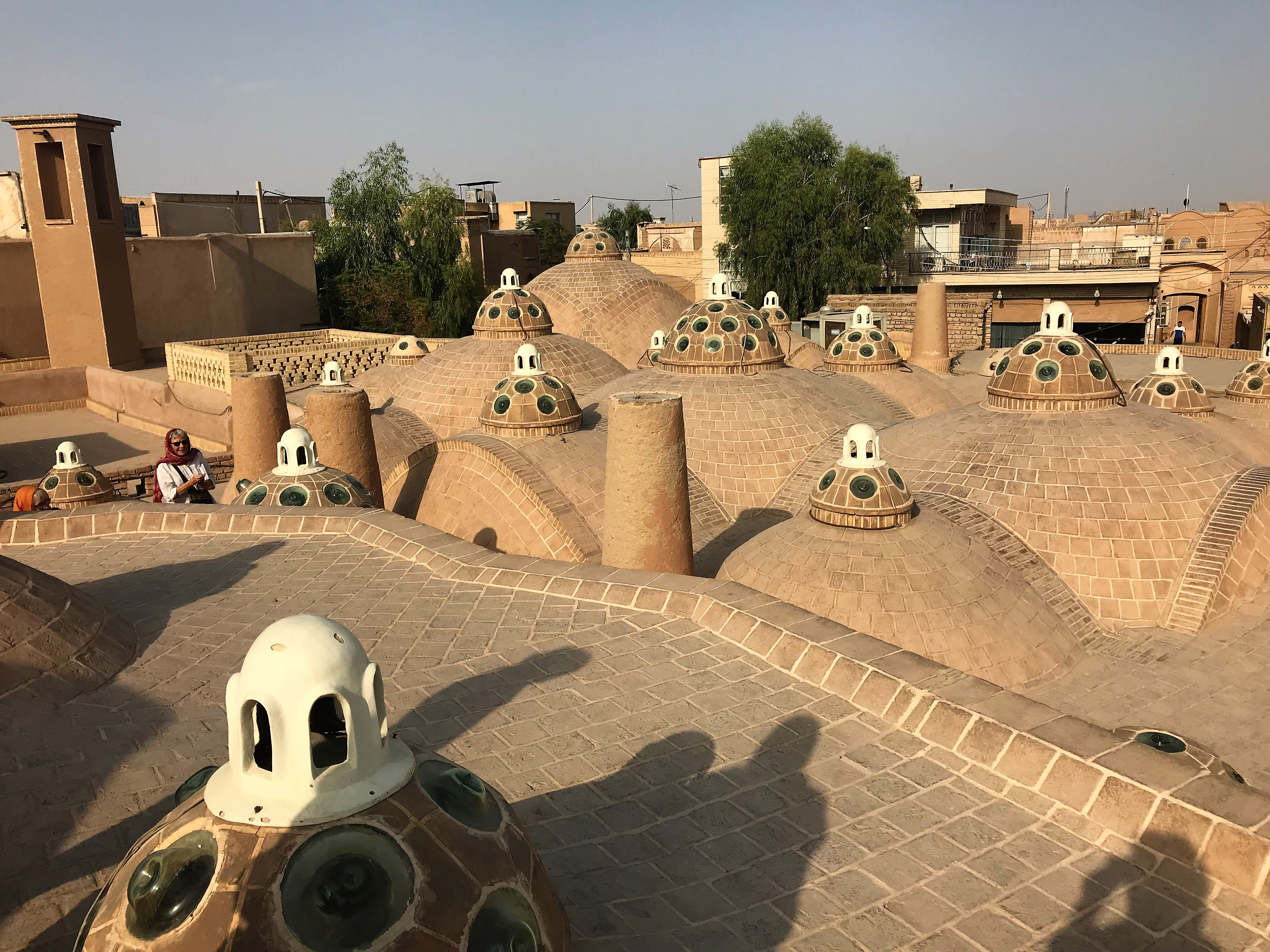
Rooftop view of the domes of the Sultan Amir Ahmed Hamam in Kashan, Iran (16th century)

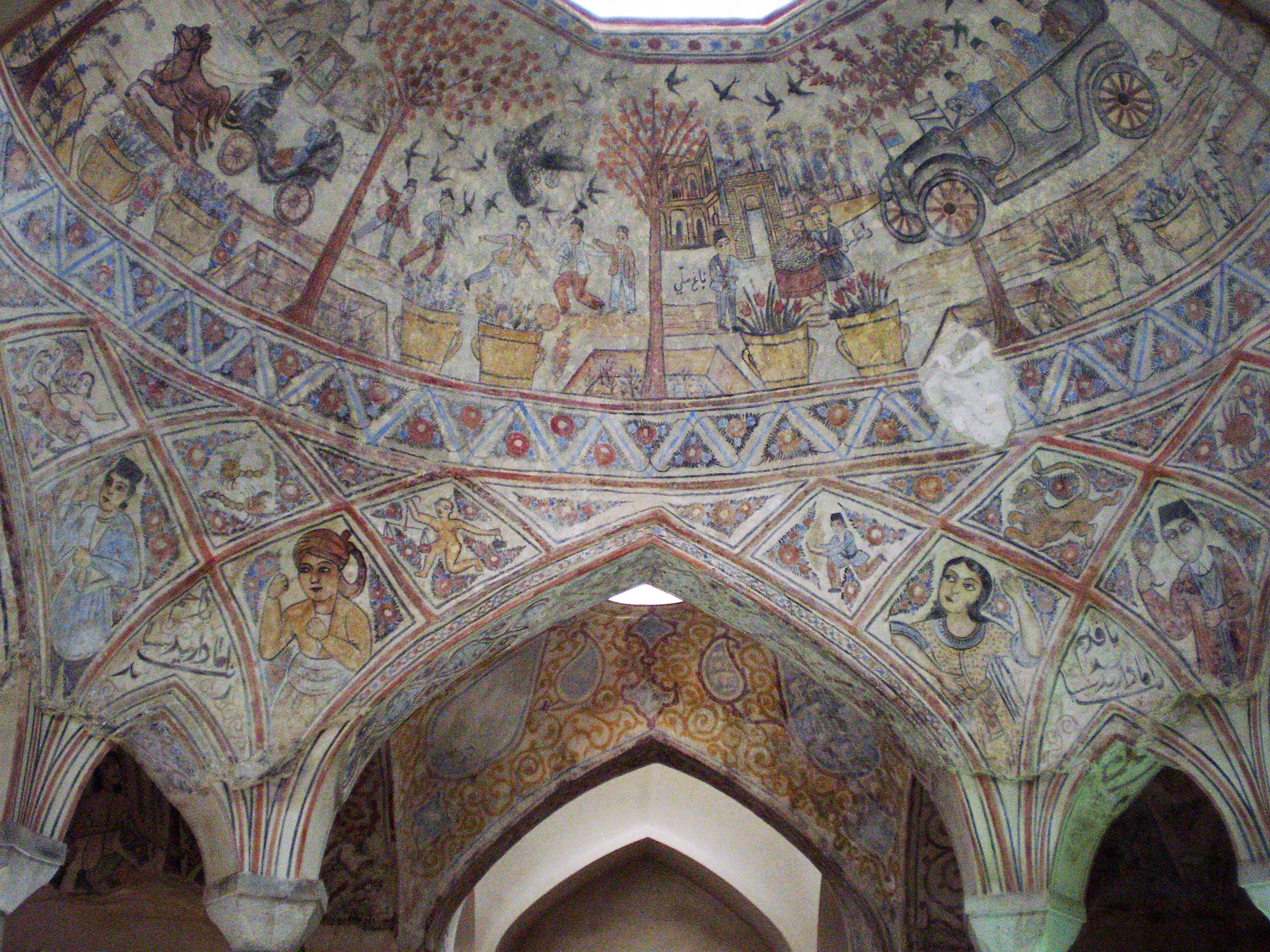
Frescoed/painted decoration in a hammam from the reign of Shah Abbas I in Mashhad, Iran (16th or 17th century)

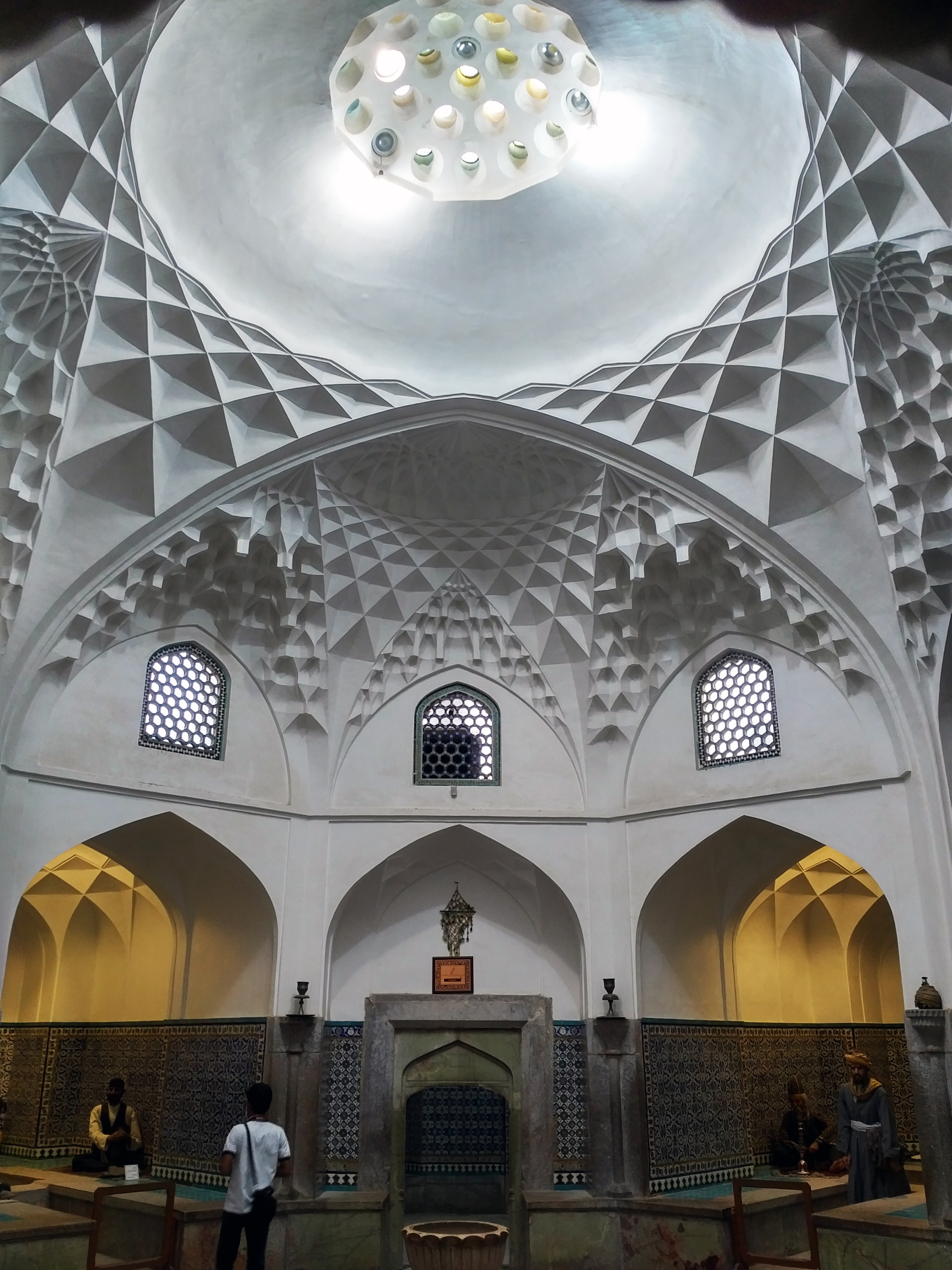
Hammam of the Ganjali Khan Complex in Kerman, Iran (late 16th to early 17th century)

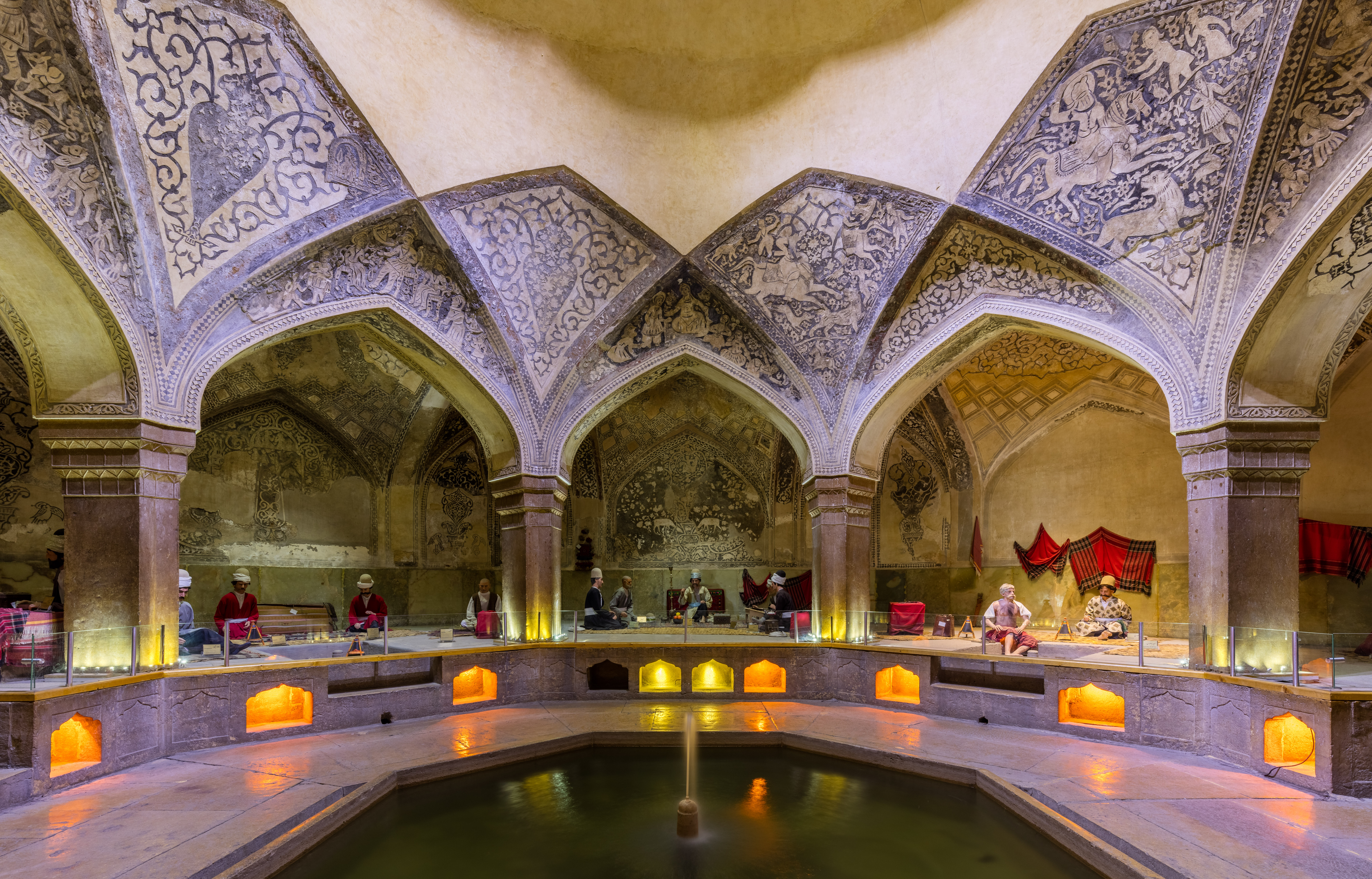
The changing room or vestibule of the Vakil Hammam in Shiraz, Iran (18th century)

== Regional examples ==
=== Jordan ===
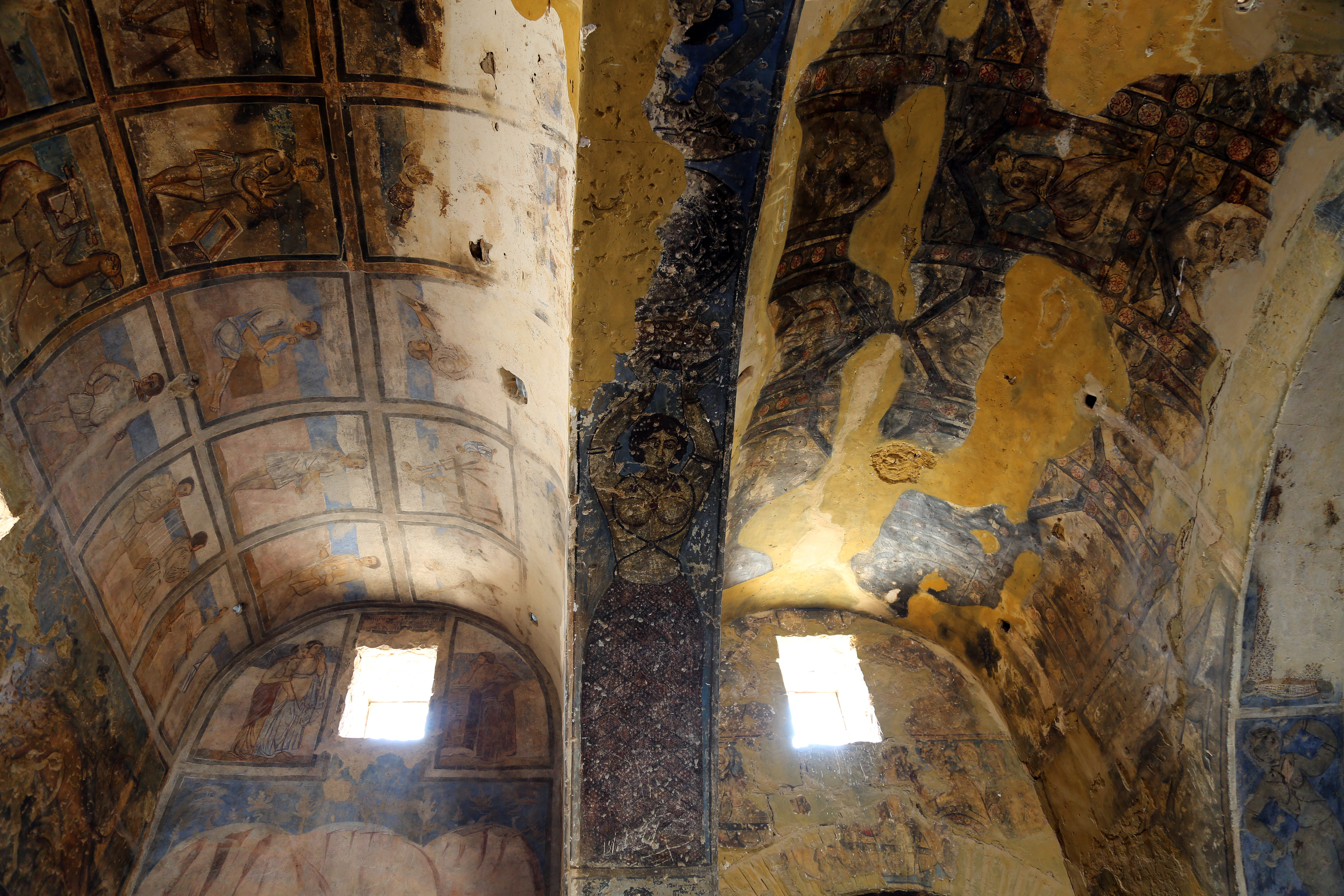
Vaulted chambers of the Umayyad bathhouse at Qusayr 'Amra, covered in Late Roman or Byzantine-style frescoes (7th or 8th century)

Jordan contains several hammams from the Umayyad era (7th to 8th centuries), making them the oldest known examples of Islamic bathhouses. Many of these are attached to the so-called "desert castles", including Qusayr 'Amra, Hammam al-Sarah, and Qasr al-Hayr al-Sharqi. Qusayr 'Amra is particularly notable for the frescoes in late Roman style that decorate the chambers, presenting a highly important example of Islamic art in its early historical stages.

=== Al-Andalus (Spain and Portugal) ===
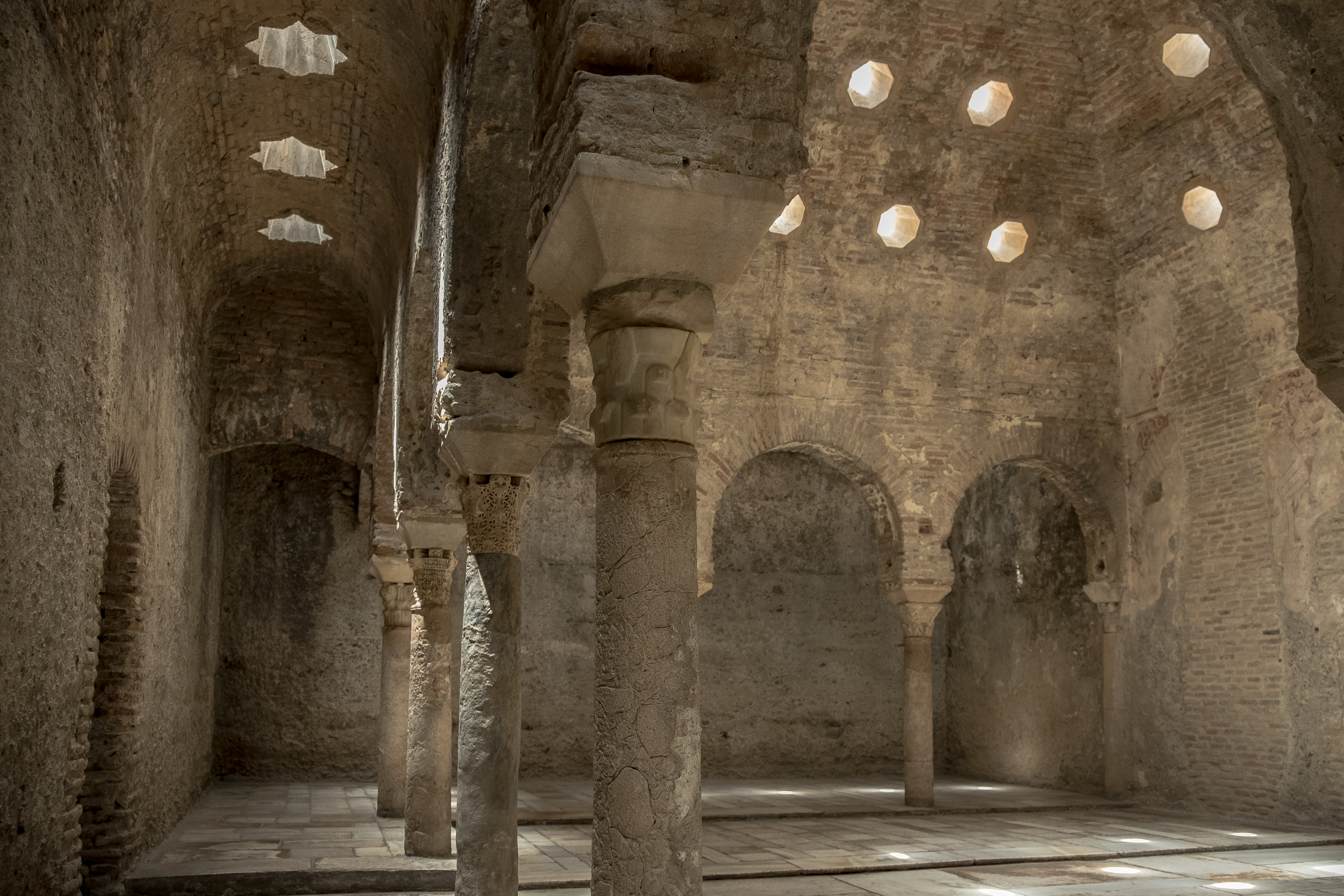
The large warm room of the Bañuelo hammam in Granada, Spain

Although the traditions of the hammams eventually disappeared in the centuries after the end of Muslim rule on the Iberian Peninsula in 1492, many historic hammam structures have nonetheless been preserved to varying degrees across the region, especially in Spain, where they are often known as "Arab baths" (Spanish: Baños Arabes). Many of them are now archeological sites or open to tourists as historical attractions. These hammams are partly distinguished from others by their larger and more monumental warm rooms (bayt al-wastani) and changing rooms (bayt al-maslaj), a feature also shared with some Moroccan hammams.

An early example (partially destroyed now) were the 10th-century Caliphal Baths which were attached to the Umayyad royal palace of Cordoba (later turned into the Christian Alcazar) and later expanded by the Almohads (12th to early 13th centuries). Other notable examples of preserved Andalusian baths include the Bañuelo of Granada, the Arab Baths of Ronda, the Arab Baths of Jaén, and the baths in the Alcazar of Jerez de la Frontera. The Alhambra of Granada also contains two preserved bathhouses: a small one near its main mosque, and a much more lavish one attached to the Comares Palace. In 2020 a well-preserved 12th-century Almohad-period bathhouse, complete with painted geometric decoration, was discovered during renovations of a local tapas bar in Seville, near the Giralda tower.

=== Morocco ===
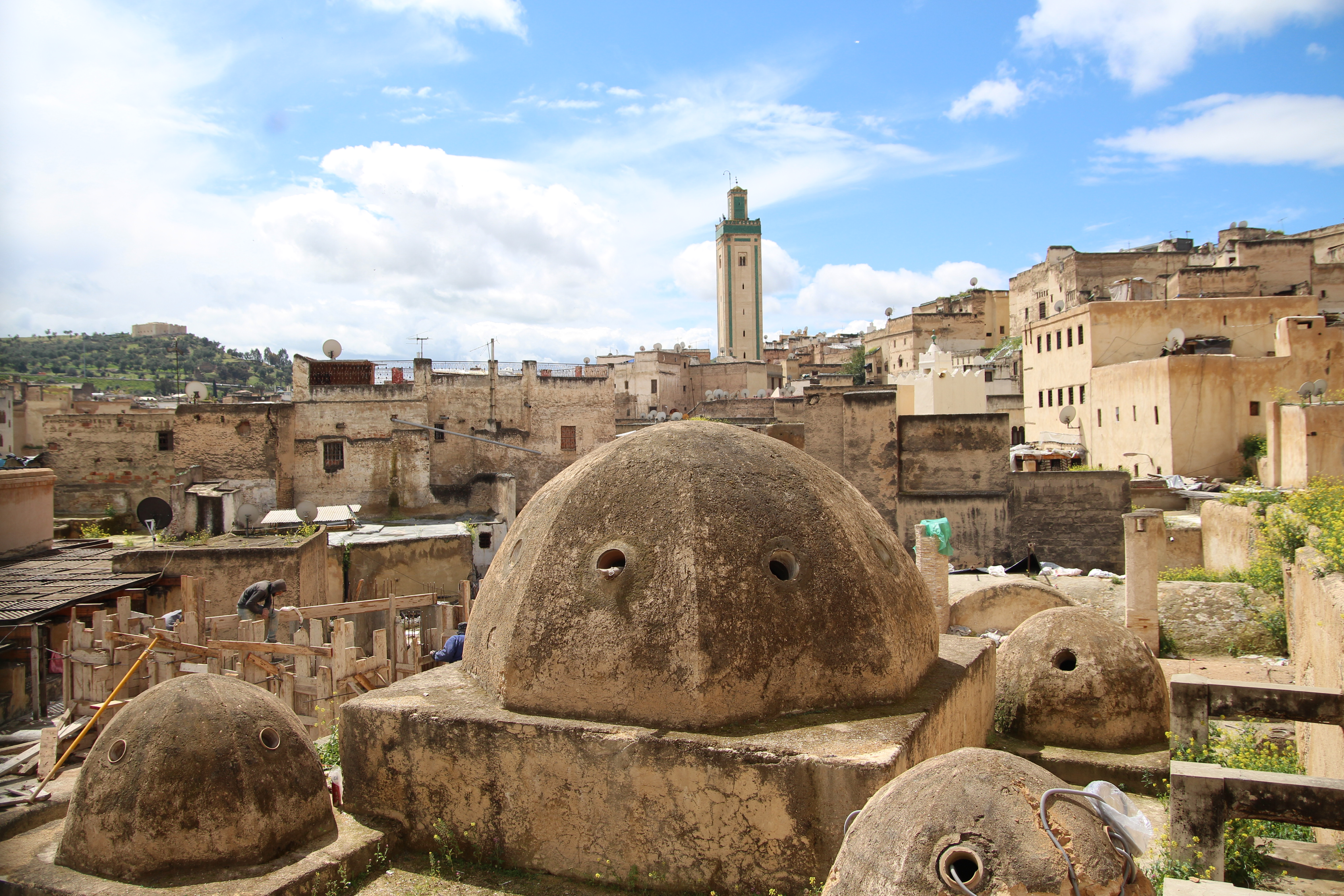
Domes of the Hammam as-Saffarin in the old city of Fez, Morocco

The ruins of the oldest known Islamic hammam in Morocco, dating back to the late 8th century, can be found in Volubilis. Many historic hammams have been preserved in cities such as Marrakesh and especially Fez, partly because they continue to be used by locals. Among the best known examples is the 14th-century Saffarin Hammam in Fes, which has been restored and rehabilitated. Moroccan hammams were typically smaller than Roman or Byzantine baths. They are often close to mosques to facilitate the performance of ablutions. Because of their private nature, their entrances are often discreet and their façades are typically windowless. Vestiges of the Roman bathing style can be seen in the three-room layout, which was widespread during the Roman/Byzantine period.

It is sometimes difficult to identify hammams from the outside but the roof has a series of characteristic domes that indicate the different chambers. They often occupy irregularly shaped plots to fit into the dense urban fabric. They are significant sites of culture and socialisation as they are integrated into city life in proximity to mosques, madrasas (schools) and souqs (markets). Magda Sibley, an expert on Islamic public baths, wrote that many specialists in Islamic architecture and urbanism found the hammams to be second in importance only to the mosques as the most significant buildings in Islamic medinas (historic cities).

=== Algeria ===
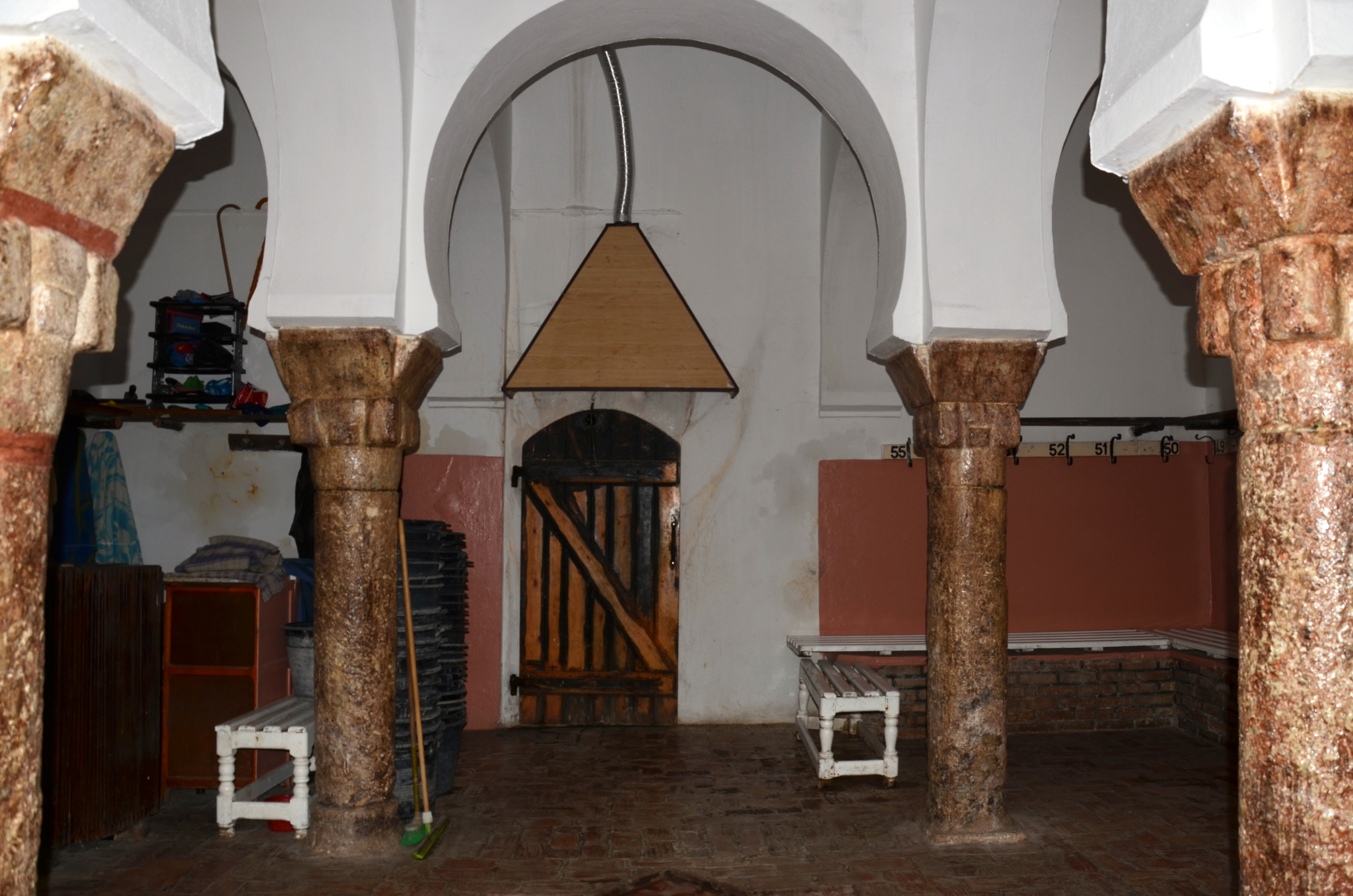
Interior of Hammam al-Bali in Nedroma (12th century)

The architecture of historic hammams in Algeria can be divided roughly two types: those with linear floor plans, influenced by Andalusi architecture (mostly up to the 15th century), and those with a centralized floor plan, influenced by Ottoman architecture (mostly from the 16th century onward). The oldest known Islamic baths in Algeria are those uncovered by archeologists, including one in Tahert from the Rustamid period (8th–9th centuries), one near the mosque of Agadir (part of present-day Tlemcen), and one at the 10th-century Zirid palace of 'Ashir. A more significant example has also been found in the Qasr al-Bahr palace at Qal'at Bani Hammad, the Hammadid capital, likely dating from the 11th to mid-12th century.

Several medieval hammams also survive in and around Tlemcen today, including the Hammam al-Sabbaghin (late 11th or 12th century), the Hammam al-Bali in nearby Nedroma (12th century), and the Hammam Sidi Bu Madyan which, along with the baths of the ruined Dar al-Sultan nearby, belonged to the 14th century complex of Sidi Bu Madyan. The first two examples have a floor plan arranged around two orthogonal axes and a large central warm room occupying the center, while those of the Sidi Bu Madyan complex are of the linear type planned around one main axis.

In Algiers, a large number of hammams were built during the Ottoman regency period (16th to early 19th centuries). A study by Nabila Chérif, published in 2009, identified nine hammam buildings that are still preserved or partly preserved in the city. The best-preserved ones are Hammam Sidi Ramdan (pre-Ottoman, possibly from the 10th or 11th centuries), Hammam Basha Sidna (circa 1550), Hammam Sirkadji (mid-17th century), Hammam al-Fitwa (mid-17th century), and Hammam Sidi 'Abd Allah (late 18th century). Apart from the older Hammam Sidi Ramdan, most of these are organized into two main sections: the cold section, which included the changing room and provided a place to rest after bathing, and the warm section, which included the heated warm and hot rooms. The hot room is generally much larger than the warm room and is centrally-planned, consisting of a square room covered by a dome, with a platform for massages in the center and various private alcoves around the edges.

=== Syria ===
A legend claims that Damascus once had 365 hammams, one for each day of the year. For centuries, these hammams formed an integral part of community life and some 50 of those in Damascus survived until the 1950s. However, by 2012, as a result of modernisation and the installation of home bathrooms, fewer than twenty Damascene hammams were still working.

According to many historians, Aleppo was home to 177 medieval hammams before the Mongol invasion when many of the city's vital structures were destroyed. Until 1970, around forty hammams were still operating. In 2010, before the start of the Syrian War, roughly eighteen hammams still operated in the ancient part of the city. Notable examples included:

- Hammam Al-Malik Al-Zahir, originally built in 985 during the Fatimid era
- Hammam al-Sultan, built in 1211 by Az-Zahir Ghazi
- Hammam al-Nahhasin, built during the 12th century near Khan al-Nahhaseen
- Hammam al-Bayadah, built in 1450 during the Mamluk era
- Hammam Yalbugha built in 1491 by the Emir of Aleppo Saif ad-Din Yalbugha al-Naseri
- Hammam al-Jawhary, Gammam Azdemir, Hammam Bahram Pasha, Hammam Bab al-Ahmar and others
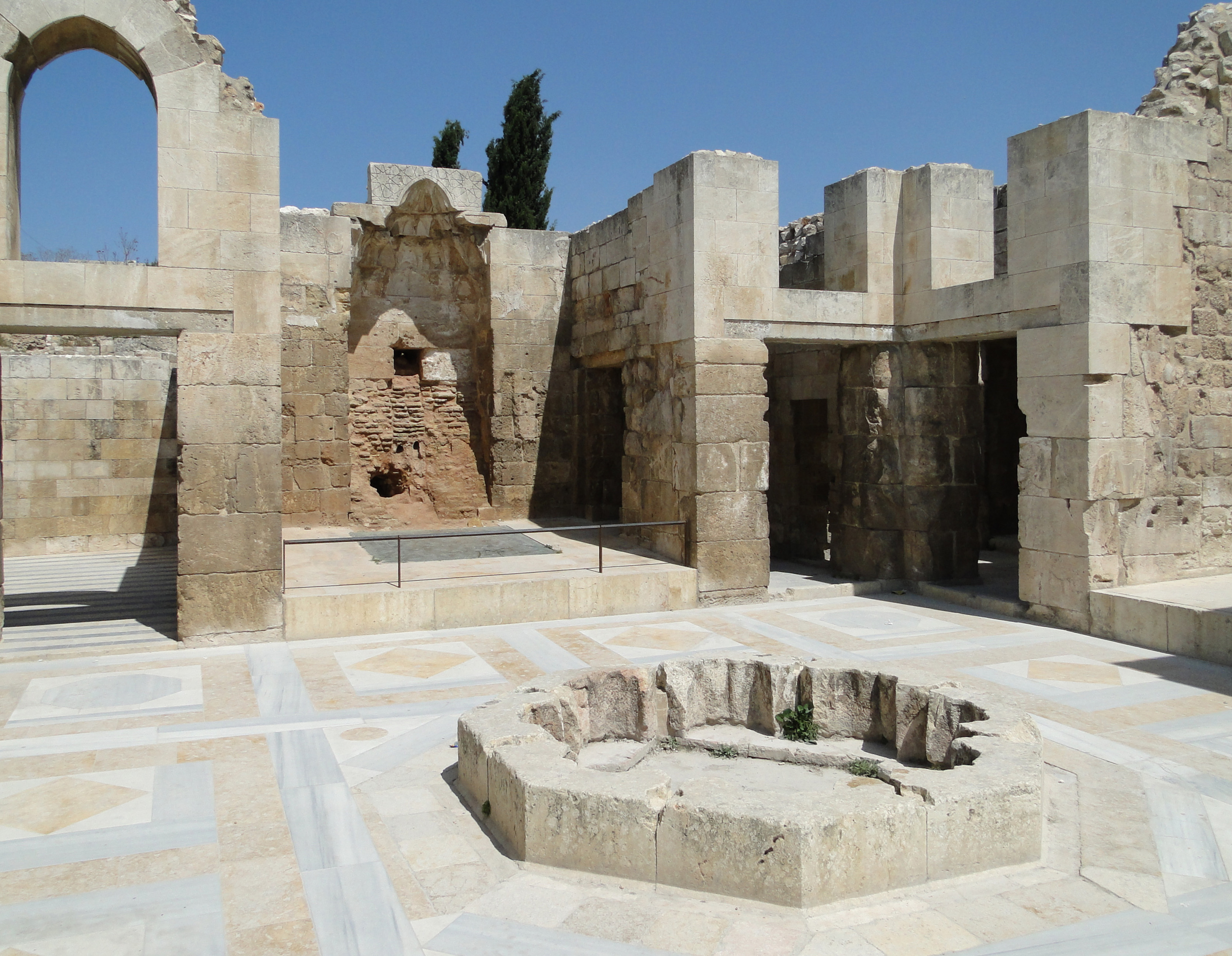
Remains of the hammam at the Citadel of Aleppo, Syria (c. 1200)

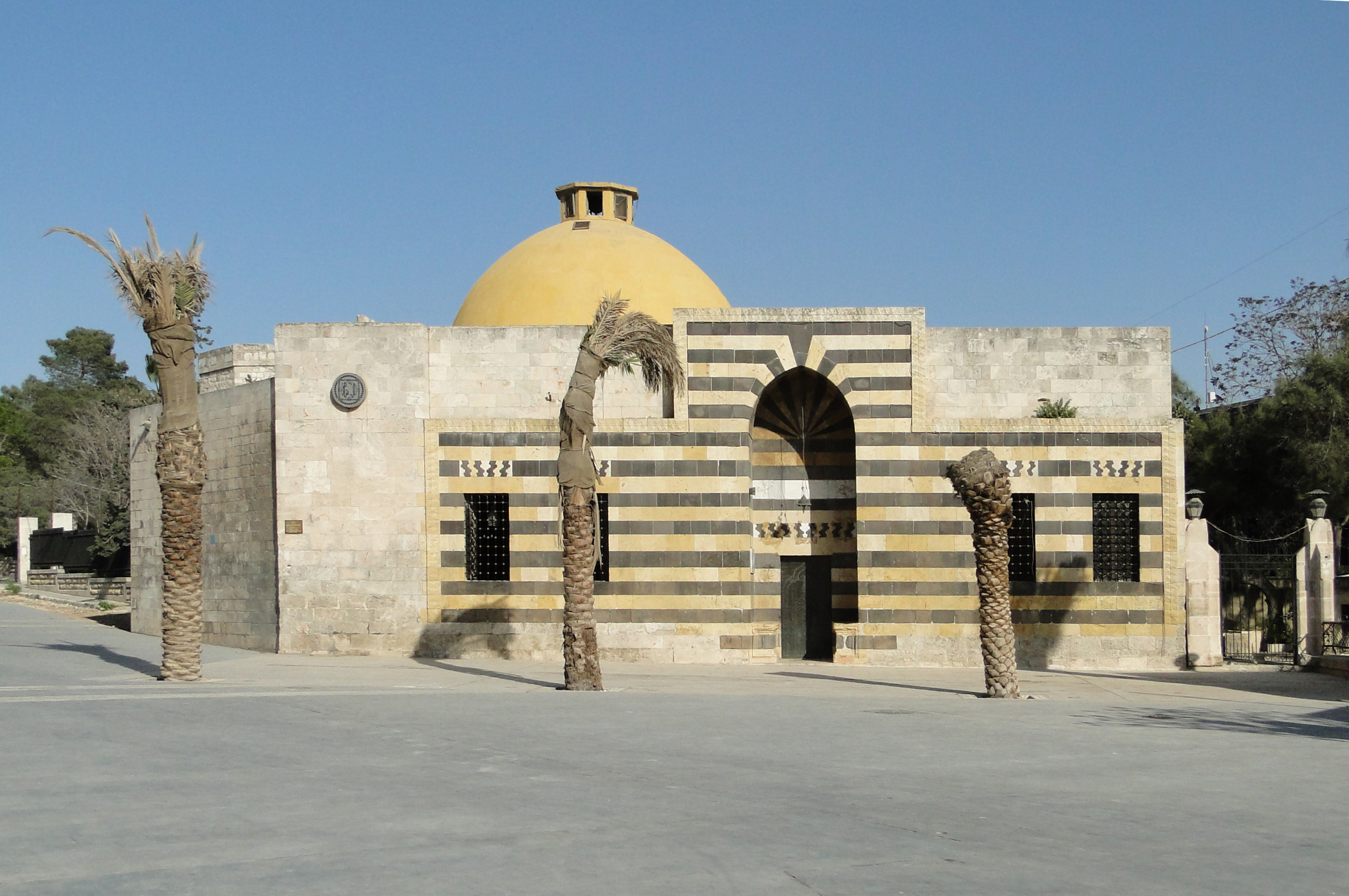
Hammam Yalbugha in Aleppo, Syria (1491)

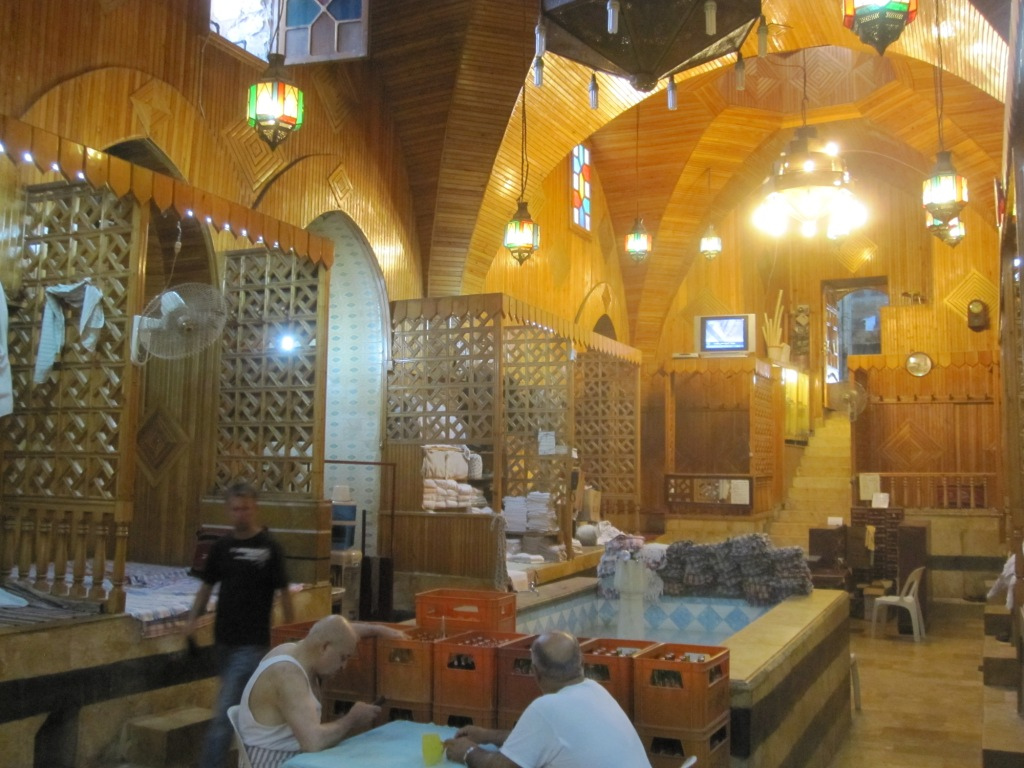
Hammam al-Nahhasin in Aleppo, Syria, originally built in the 12th century

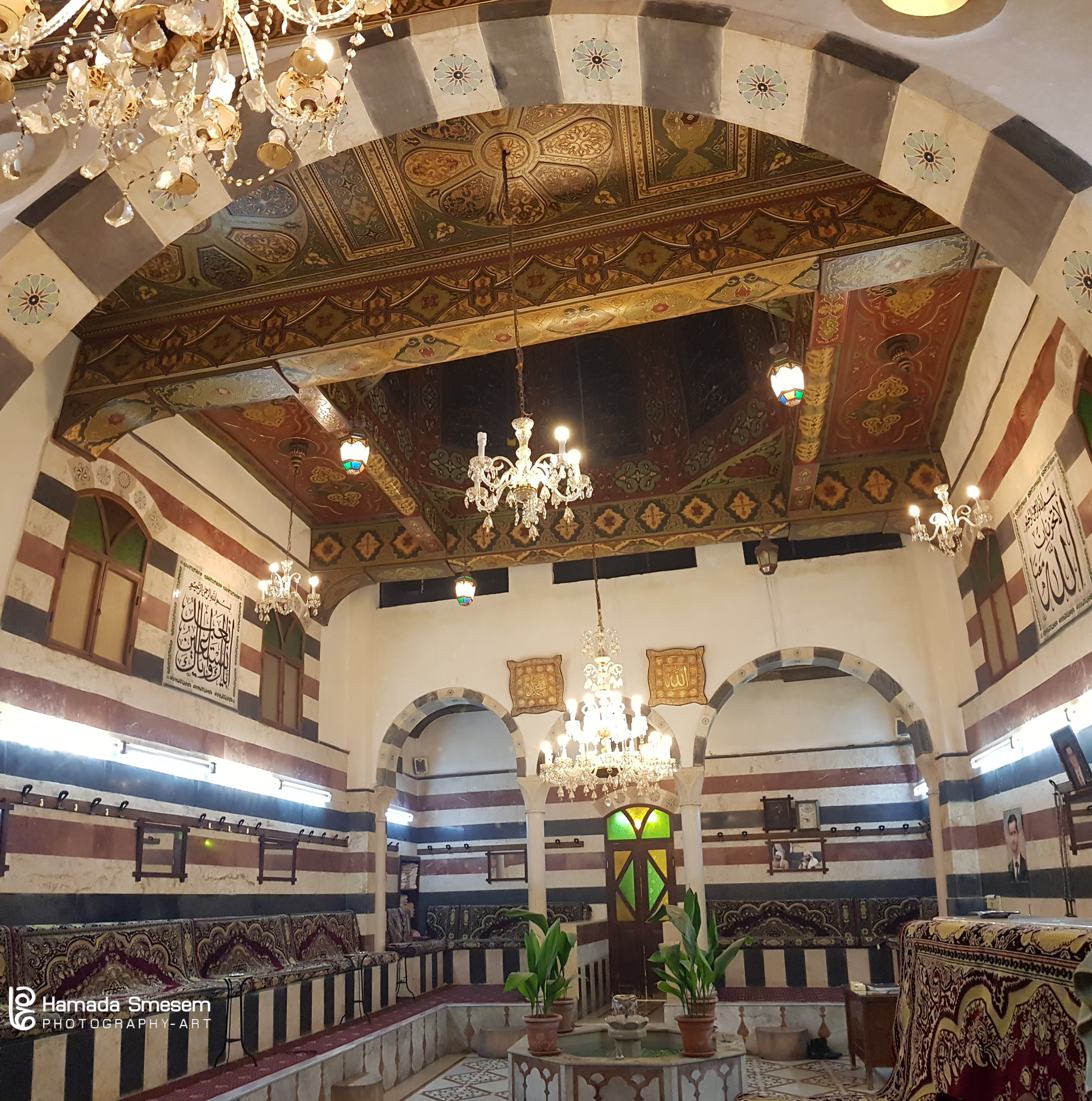
Al-Rifai Hammam in Damascus, Syria

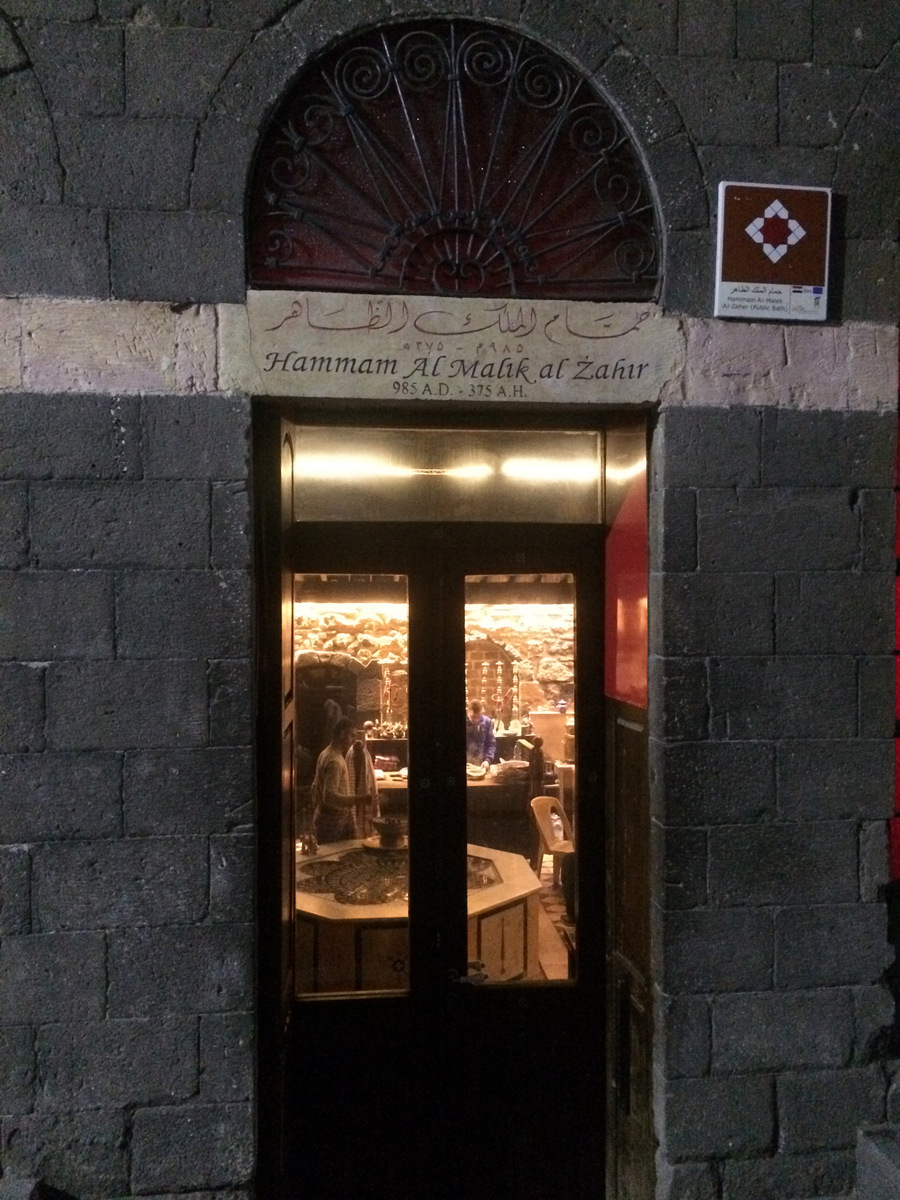
Hammam Al-Malik Al-Zahir in Damascus, Syria

=== Egypt ===
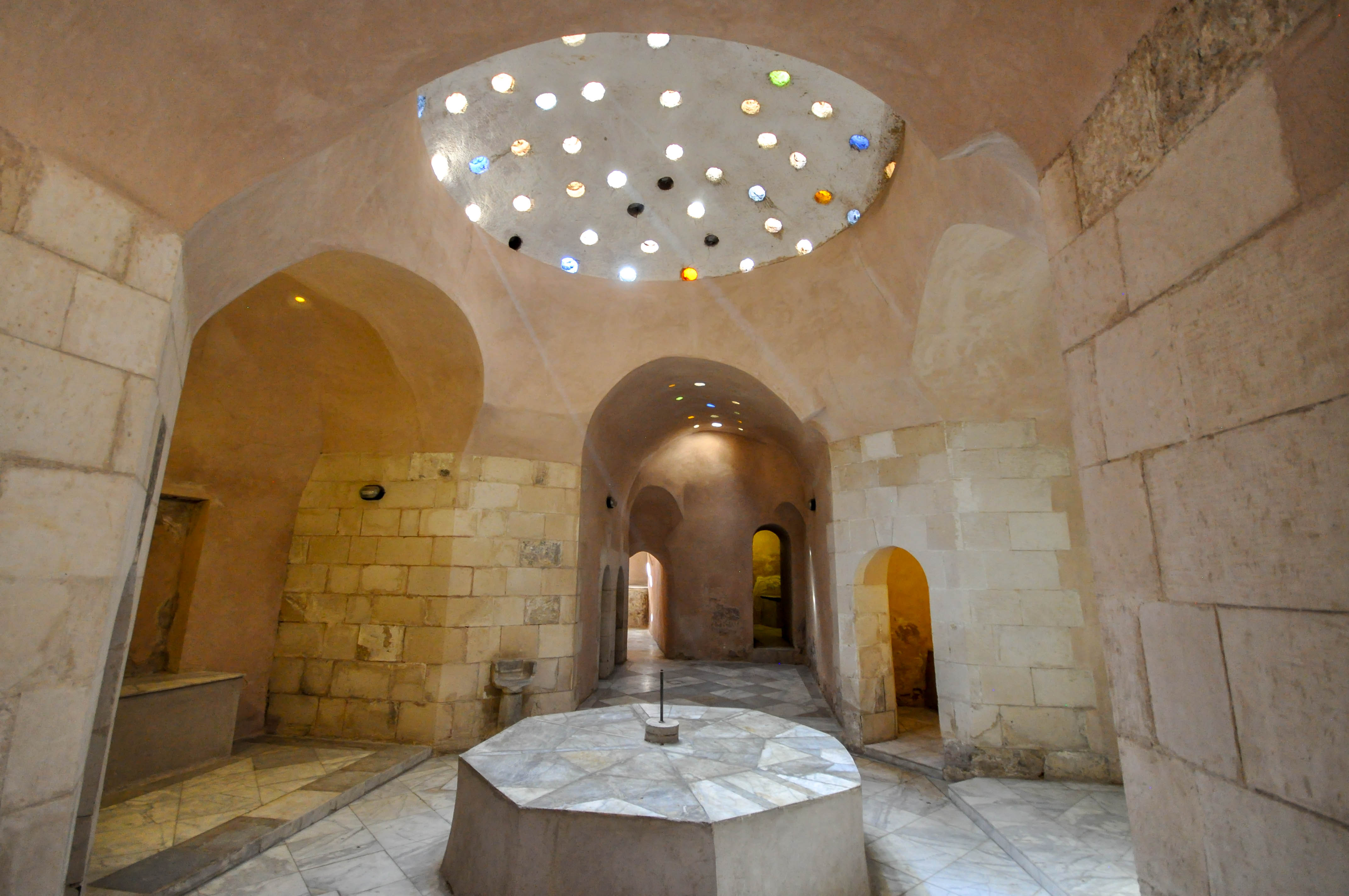
The Sultan Inal Hammam in Cairo, dating from 1456 (Mamluk period)

As in neighbouring regions, bathhouses had existed in Egypt for centuries before the arrival of the Arab Muslims in Egypt in the 7th century. Greek bathhouses were present in Alexandria, a capital of Hellenistic culture, as well as in other cities like Karanis in the Faiyum. During the subsequent Islamic period, bathhouses continued to be built by Muslim rulers and patrons, sometimes as part of larger religious and civic complexes. Although not many have survived intact to the present day, numerous public baths were built by the Fatimids (10th–12th centuries), the Ayyubids (12th–13th centuries), the Mamluks (13th–16th centuries), and the Ottomans (16th–19th centuries). One well-preserved medieval example is the restored Hammam of Sultan Inal, dating from 1456 and located at Bayn al-Qasrayn in Cairo. Private hammams were also built as part of palaces, with surviving examples at the Palace of Amir Taz (14th century) and the Harim Palace (19th century), and of local aristocratic mansions such as Bayt al-Razzaz (15th–18th centuries) and Bayt al-Suhaymi (17th–18th centuries). In many Egyptian hammams a pool of hot water is present in the hot room and used for immersion and bathing, a feature shared with the hammams of Iran.

Today, the cultural practice of visiting hammams has significantly receded in Egypt. Cairo contained an estimated 77 operational hammams at the beginning of the 19th century, but only 33 were operating in 1969 and only eight were still operating at the start of the 21st century, with many others abandoned or neglected. Of the few still functioning hammams, many are also in precarious condition and scholars have indicated that they are likely to disappear or stop functioning in the near future. A few hammams, mainly in the neighbourhoods of Historic Cairo, have been restored or earmarked for restoration as historic monuments, including the Sultan Inal Hammam, the monumental but ruined hammam of Sultan al-Mu'ayyad (behind the al-Mu'ayyad Mosque), the Hammam al-Gamaliyya (in the Gamaliya neighbourhood), the Hammam al-Sinaniya (in Bulaq), and the Hammam al-Sukariya (in Darb al-Ahmar).

=== Turkey ===
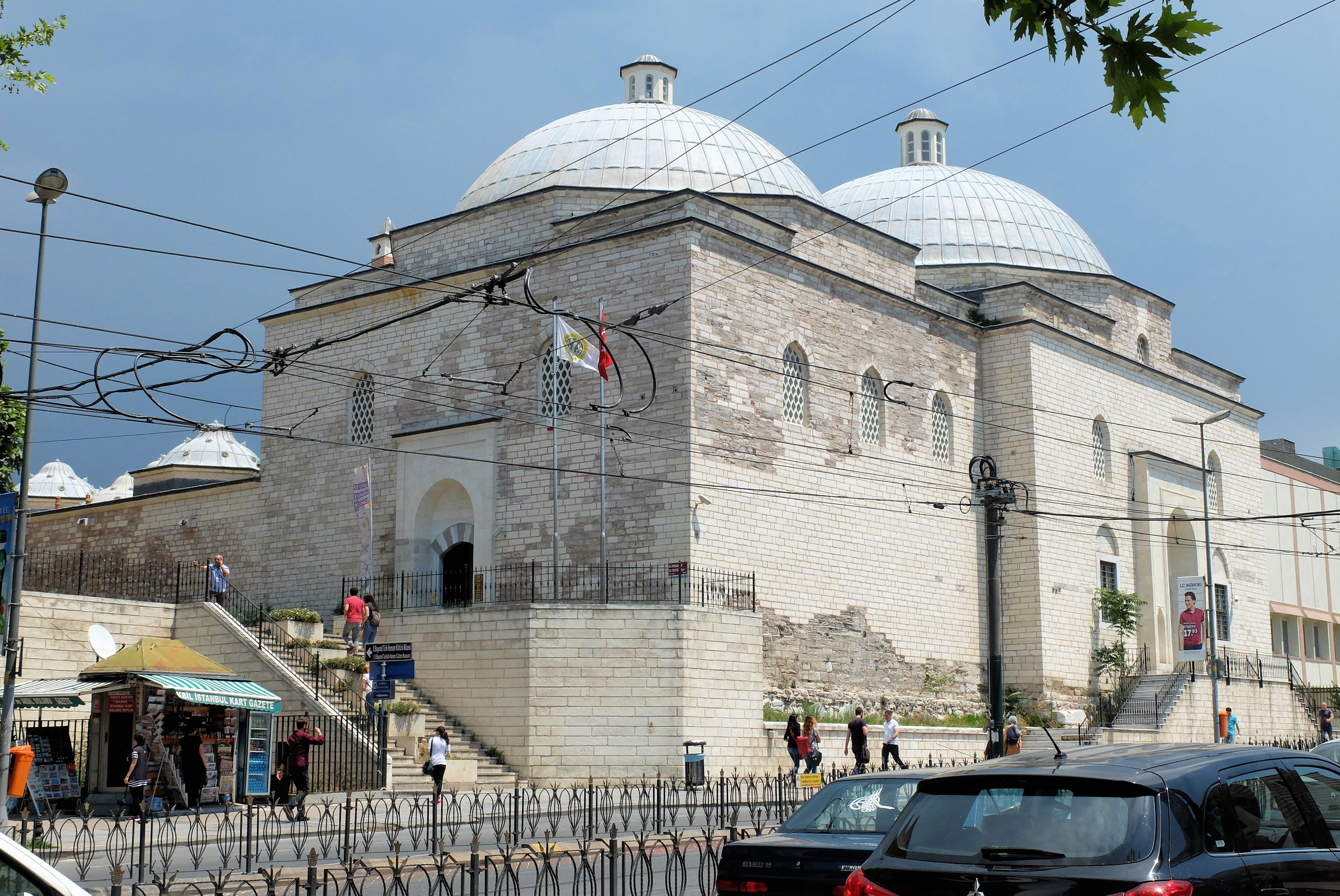
The Bayezid II Hammam (originally part of the külliye of the Bayezid II Mosque) was built at the beginning of the 16th century and now serves as a museum.

Public baths were a feature of life in Turkey in Ancient Greek and Roman times, and the Seljuk Turks continued to build hammams here. The majority of historic hammams, however, survive from the Ottoman period (14th–20th centuries). Many examples of early Ottoman hammams remain, particularly in the early Ottoman capitals of Edirne and Bursa, where many of their early structural and decorative features were established. Many were built in association with particular mosques or religious complexes (külliyes). Notable examples from the pre-1453 period include the Orhan Bey Hamam in Bursa (built around 1339), the Demirtaş Hamam in Bursa (14th century), the Hacı Hamza Hamam in Iznik (late 14th or early 15th century), the Çelebi Sultan Mehmet Hamam in Merzifon (1413), the Mahkeme Hamam in Bursa (1421), the Gazi Mihal Hamam in Edirne (1422, now partly ruined), the Emir Sultan Hamam in Bursa (1426), the Beylerbeyi Hamam in Edirne (1429, now partly ruined), and the Karacabey Hamam in Ankara (1444).

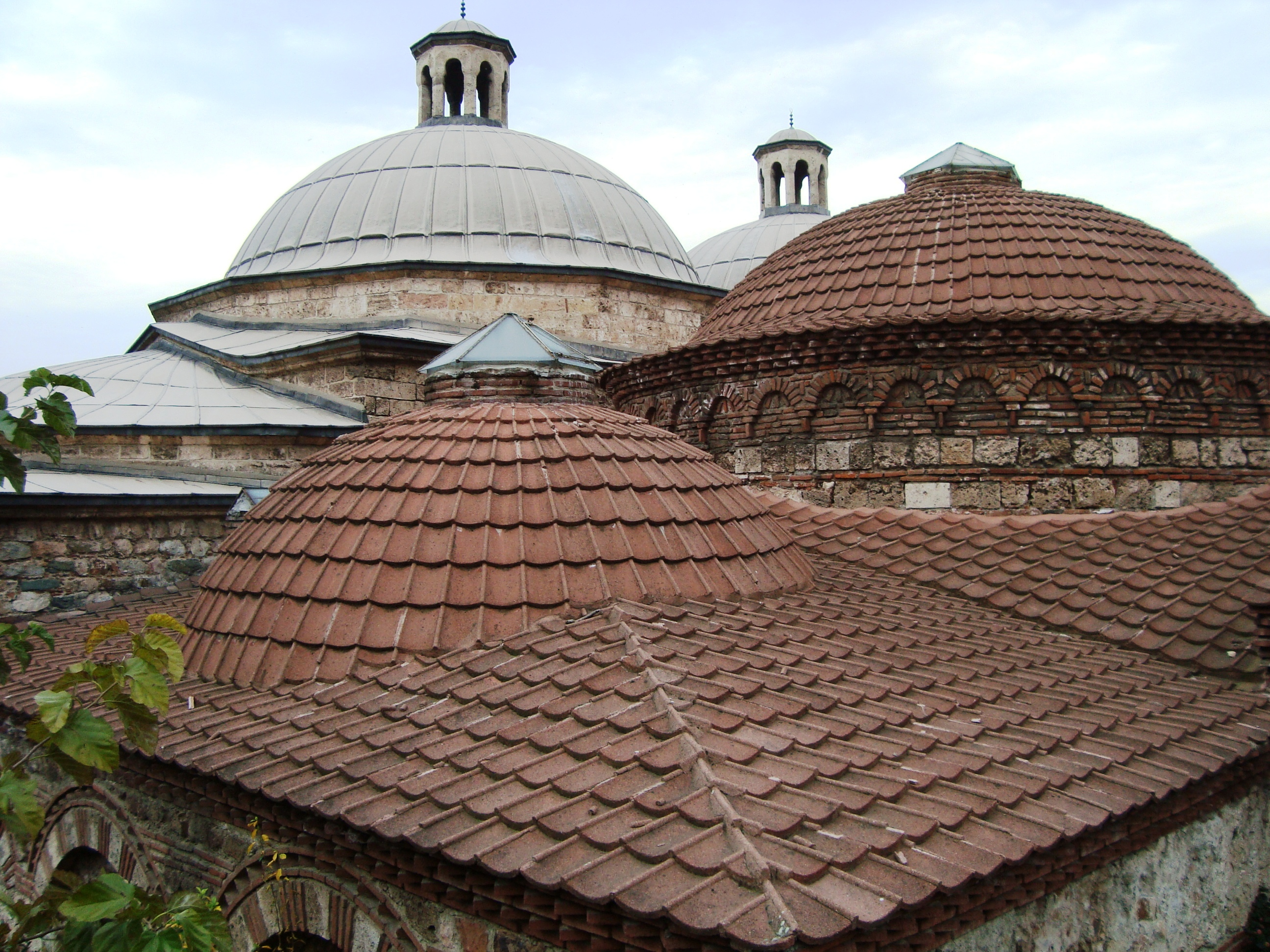
The Eski Kaplıca Hamamı ('Old Thermal Baths') in Bursa, dating from the 14th century and using one of Bursa's thermal springs

After the conquest of Constantinople in 1453, Istanbul became a centre of Ottoman architectural patronage. The city's oldest hammams include the Tahtakale Hamam (built soon after 1453), the Mahmut Pasha Hamam (built in 1466 and part of the Mahmut Pasha Mosque complex), the Gedik Ahmet Pasha Hamam (built in 1475), the Bayezid II Hamam (built some time between 1500 and 1507), and the Küçük Mustafa Pasha Hamam (built before 1512 near the Gül Mosque).

Several major hammams in the city were designed by the famous Ottoman architect Mimar Sinan in the 16th century. These include the Çinili Hamam (built in 1545 in the Zeyrek neighbourhood), the Süleymaniye Hammam (part of the Süleymaniye Mosque complex built in 1550–1557), the Mihrimah Sultan Hamam (part of the Mihrimah Sultan Mosque complex built in 1562–1565), the Kılıç Ali Pasha Hamam (part of the Kılıç Ali Pasha Complex completed in 1580), as well as a lesser-known but architecturally interesting hammam in Ortaköy. The Çemberlitaş Hamam (on Divanyolu Street in the Çemberlitaş neighbourhood), completed in 1584 or earlier, is also attributed to Mimar Sinan. The largest hammam designed by Sinan is the Haseki Hürrem Sultan Hamam which was commissioned by Süleyman I's consort, Hürrem Sultan, and completed in 1556 on the site of the historical Baths of Zeuxippus for the religious community of the nearby Hagia Sophia. Outside Istanbul, Sinan also designed the Sokullu Mehmet Pasha Hamam in Edirne around 1568–1569. Among the hammams built after the 16th century one of the most famous is the Cağaloğlu Hamam, finished in 1741 and one of the last major hammams to be built in Istanbul.

Turkey also has a number of hot springs which have been developed as public baths for centuries. The Eski Kaplıca ("Old Thermal Baths") of Bursa, built by Sultan Murad I (ruled 1360–1389), and the nearby Yeni ("New") Kaplıca built by Rüstem Pasha in 1552, are two of the most notable examples and are still used today. Several older hot-spring baths were also built by the Seljuks in the 13th century and the Akkoyunlu in the late 14th century, some of which are still operating today.

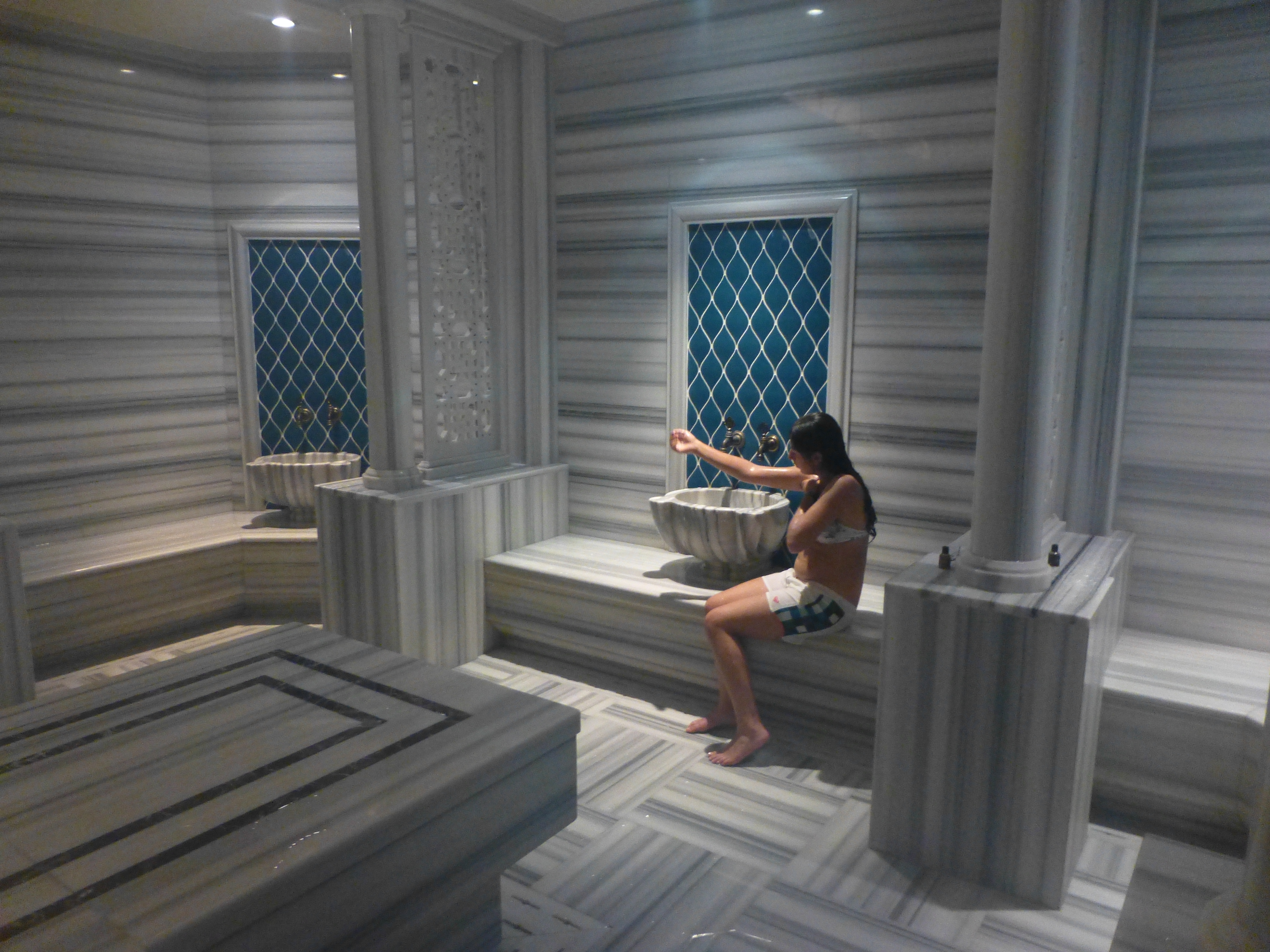
A modern hotel hammam catering to tourists in Istanbul

Although far fewer in number than in the past, many Turkish hammams still operate today. With the growth in tourism, some have been restored or modernised recently with differing degrees of historical authenticity. Other hammam buildings have ceased functioning as public baths but have been repurposed as markets or cultural venues, as for example the Tahtakale Hamam in Istanbul which contains shops and cafes, the Hoca Paşa Hamam in Istanbul which is used for performances by whirling dervishes, the Küçük Mustafa Paşa Hamamı in Istanbul which is used for art exhibitions, and the Orhan Bey Hamam in Bursa which is part of the Covered Bazaar. In some cases hamam buildings have been turned into storage depots or factories, though this has usually led to neglect and damage to their historic fabric.

=== Azerbaijan ===
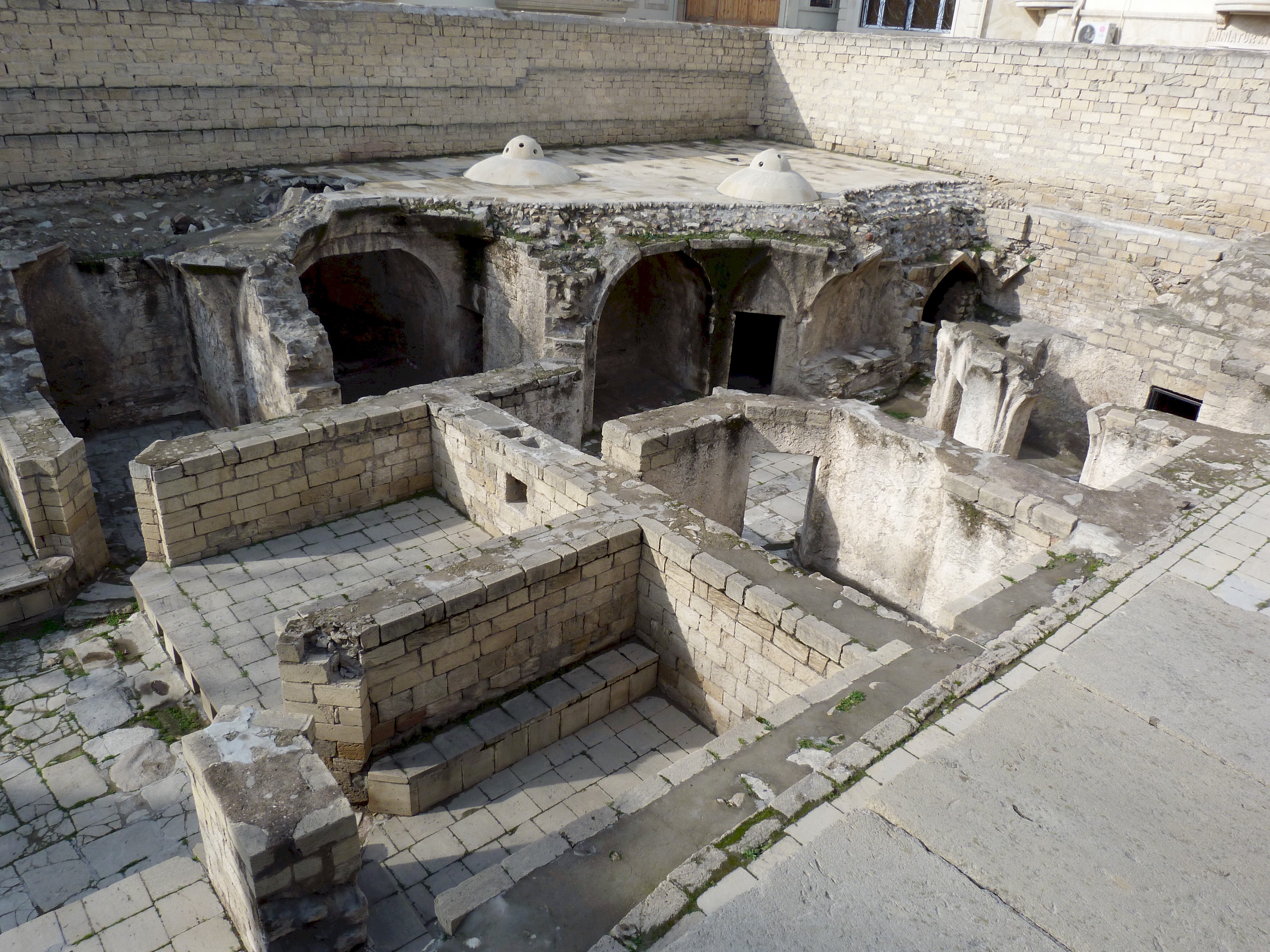
Part of the hammam at the Palace of the Shirvanshahs

Hammams have traditionally been important in the lives of Azerbaijanis, and more than seven have been named in Azerbaijan's List of historical reserves. For centuries, local benefactors would build hammams to serve the needs of the people in their vicinity, often naming them after themselves, a practice still evident as late as the nineteenth century. At the other extreme lies the 15th century hammam within the Palace of the Shirvanshahs built solely for the use of the shah and his family. Discovered during archaeological excavations in 1939, the hammam had twenty-six rooms. The ruins lie within Icherisheher, the Old City of Baku, historical core of the capital, and a UNESCO World Heritage Centre.

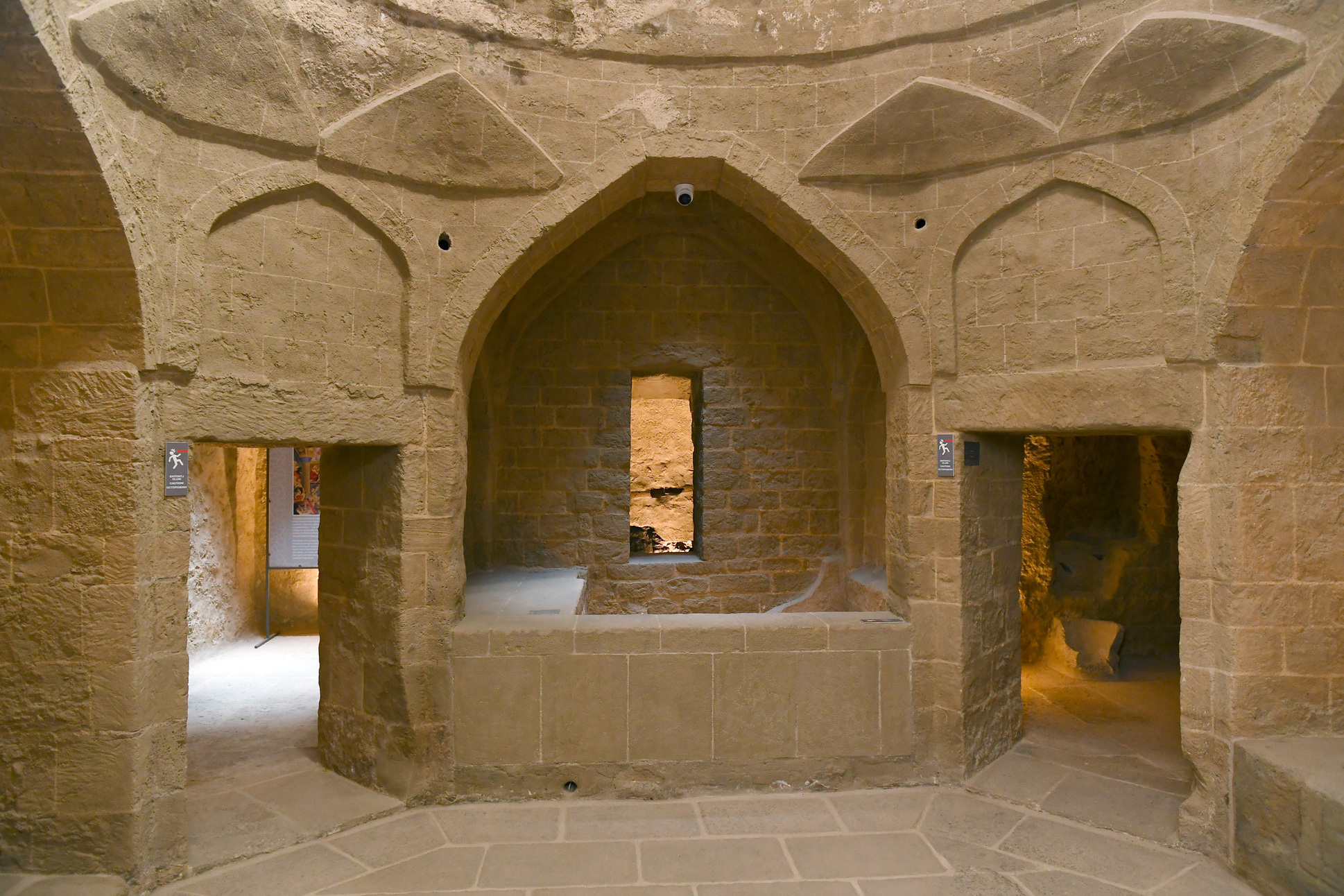
Baku's underground Yeraltı Hammam

Within the Old City, the building of baths continued over the years. The Yeraltı Hammam is said to have been built in the 17th century and, like others, is located underground, helping to maintain steady temperatures inside. (Note: In these very brief descriptions of some Azerbaijani hammams, sources have not generally been given as they could not easily be checked; instead, links have been provided to those pages which do include them, and which have here been used.) The 18th century Agha Mikayil Bath near the fortress gates, is the oldest hammam still open in Baku and is one of the few with women's days. Its four central pillars allow large square bathrooms with pointed arches, covered with a variety of cupolas and domes. Another 19th century bath, the Agha Zeynal Hammam, is atypical in that it is housed in a residential building, although the interior maintains the more traditional layout. In the centre of Baku, the Tazabay Hammam was built in 1886 in Islamic style, though with separate rooms. It was fully 'restored' in 2003 and currently has many additional modern facilities, such as manicure and three saunas, which help to make it popular with tourists while still attracting local residents.

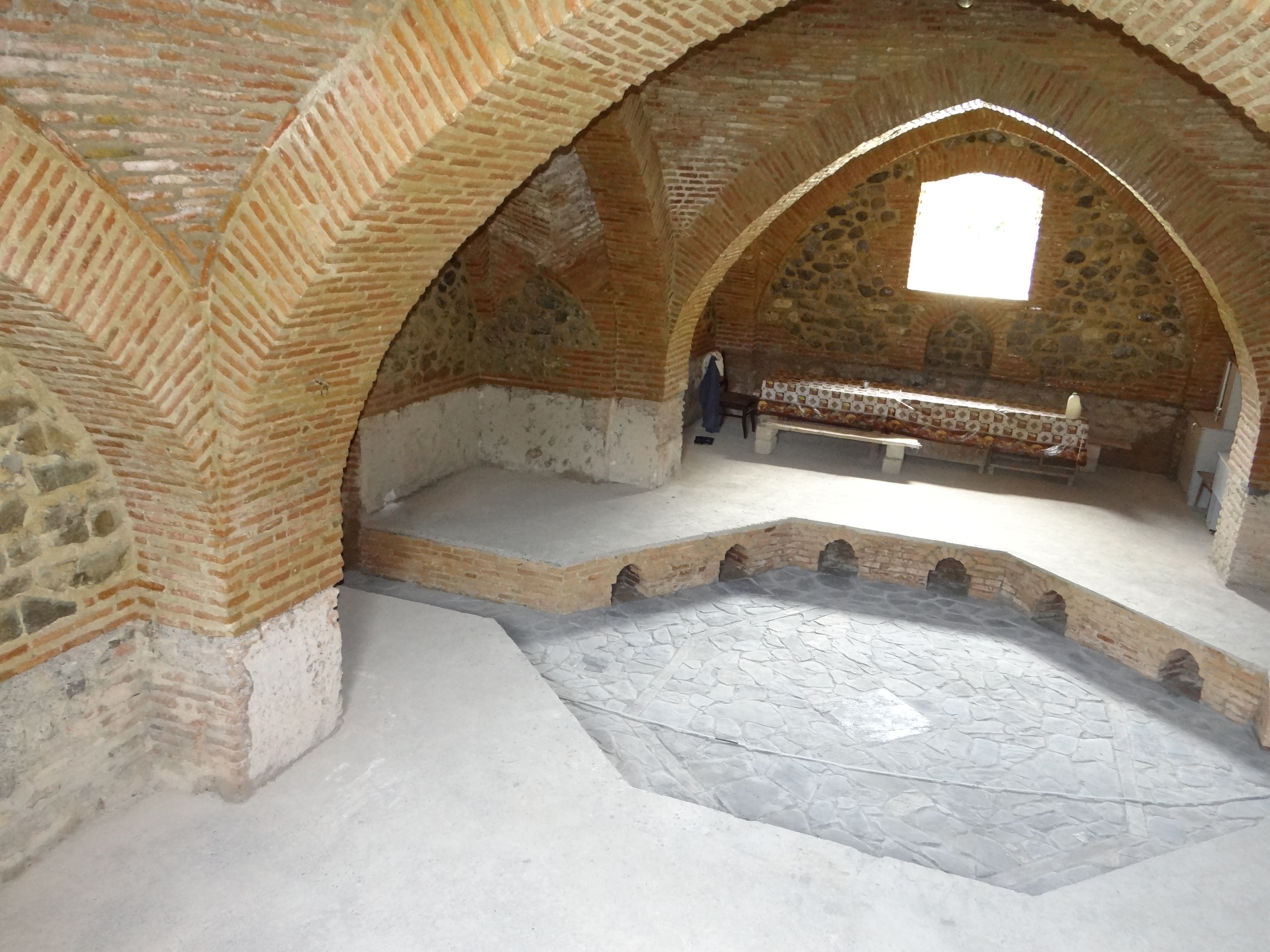
The "Underground Bath" in Sheki

Two other important 19th century hammams are to be found in northwestern Azerbaijan in Sheki, where the centre of the city was inscribed in the UNESCO World Heritage List in 2019. The first is Dara Bathhouse which has been unusable since the 1980s, but is protected and included in the list of architectural monuments. The bath is 6 metres underground, has pools with hot and cold water, and is lit from above by small holes in the domes which cover it. The second is the Yeraltı Hammam, also known as the Underground Bath or Abdulsalam Bath. In fact, it is located within the Juma Mosque, and only part of it is 4 metres below ground. The building is no longer used as a hammam.

=== South Asia ===
Public baths have ancient precedents in Indian civilisation. The Great Bath located in present-day Pakistan is a notable example dating from the 3rd millennium BC at the archeological site of Mohenjo-daro in the Indus Valley. Islamic hammams were introduced after the spread of Muslim rule in the subcontinent starting mainly with the Delhi Sultanate in the 13th century and continuing through the later Mughal period (16th–19th centuries). Historically, however, public bathhouses in the Indian subcontinent were less common and less important than in other Muslim territories such as the Middle East and North Africa. This was due to the fact that, unlike most cities in those regions, water was readily available across much of India, making hammams less essential for bathing and performing full ablutions. While there were many elaborate hammams in private palaces and mansions, few Indian hammams were as important as those of Muslim cities further west.

Delhi, Hyderabad and Bhopal in India still have multiple working hammams, which date back to the Mughal period in the early 16th century. Two prominent examples are the Hammam-e-Qadimi and Hammam-e-Lal Qila.

In Pakistan, Shahi Hammam or the Royal Bathhouse of Lahore, located in the historic Walled City, is one of the best preserved examples of a Mughal-era hammam. It was built in 1634 by the Mughal governor of Lahore, Hakim Ilmuddin Ansari, during the reign of Emperor Shah Jahan.

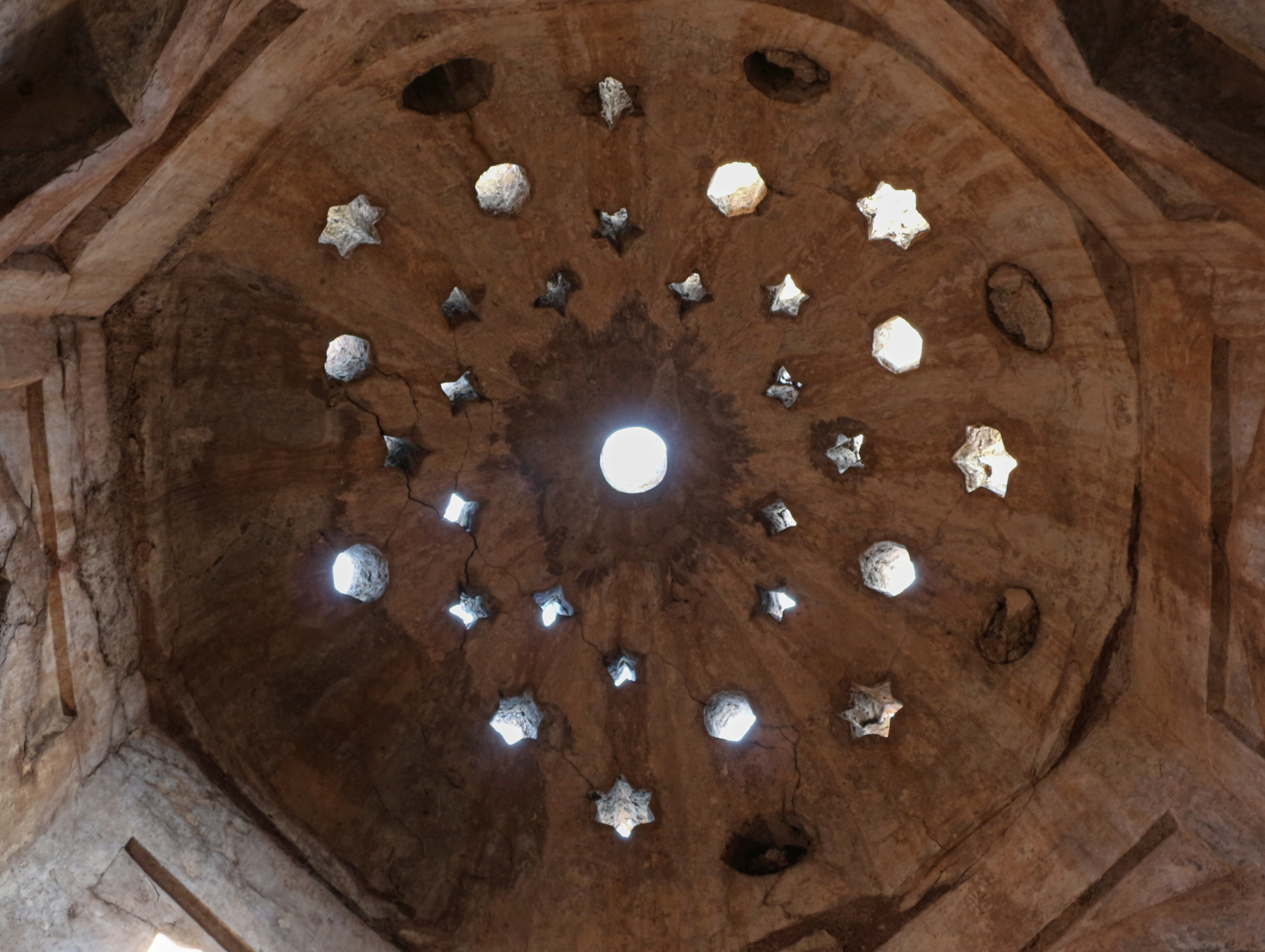
Dome of a hammam in Mandu, India

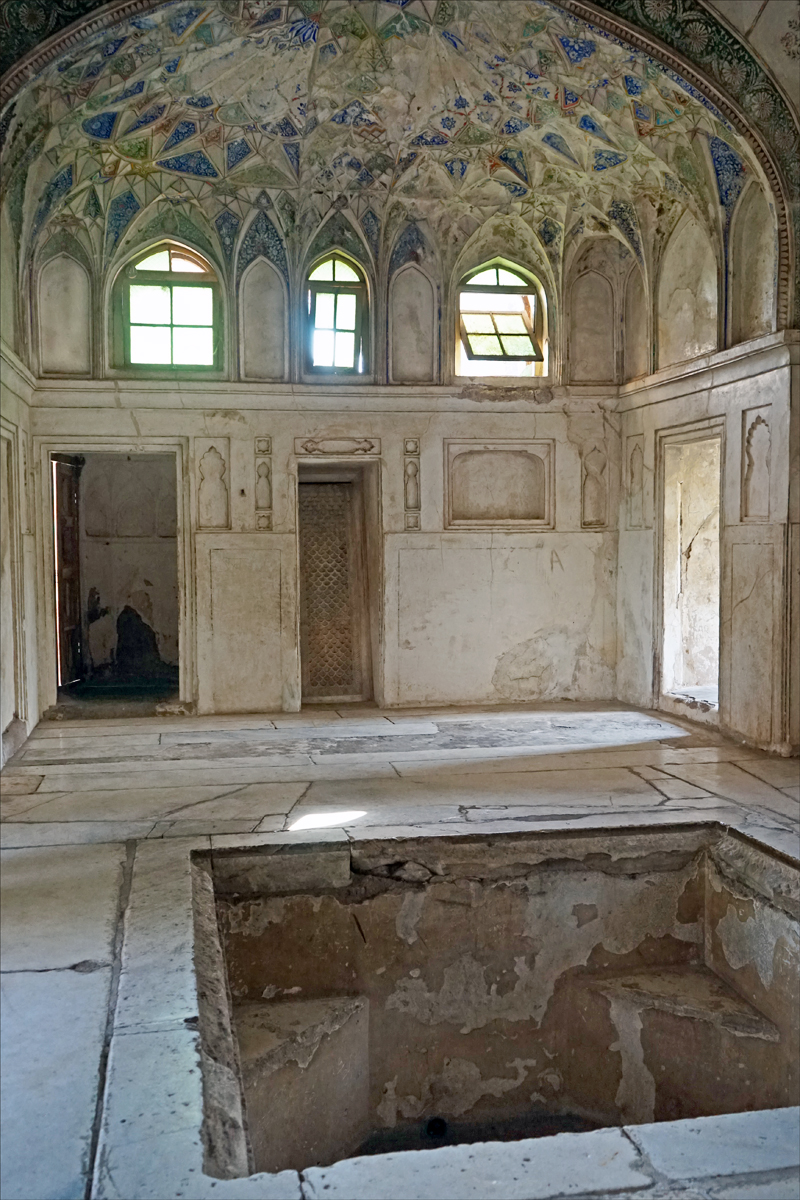
The hammam of the Shahi Qila Palace in Burhanpur, India (17th century)

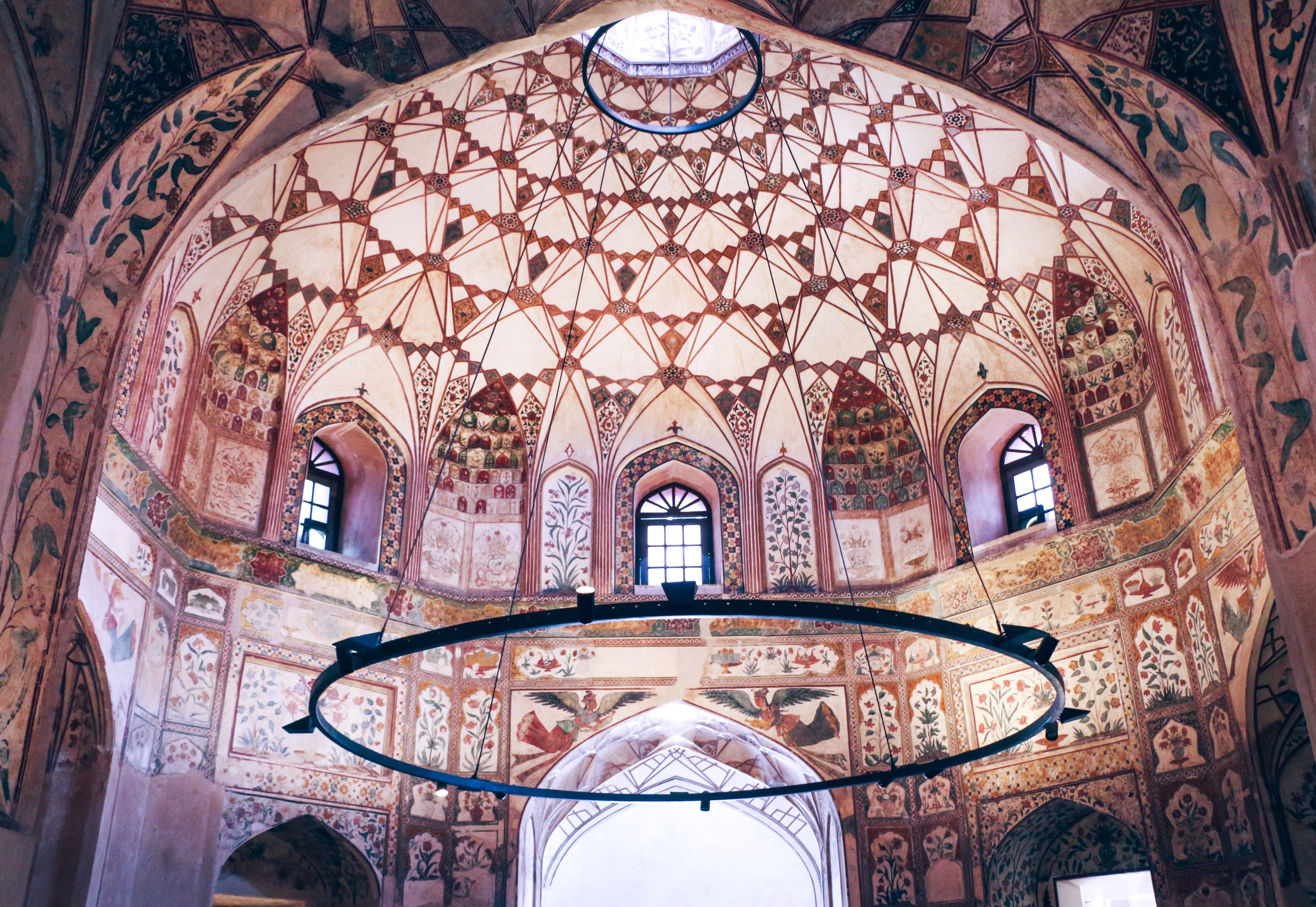
The 17th-century Shahi Hammam in Lahore, Pakistan, is elaborately decorated with Mughal-era frescoes.

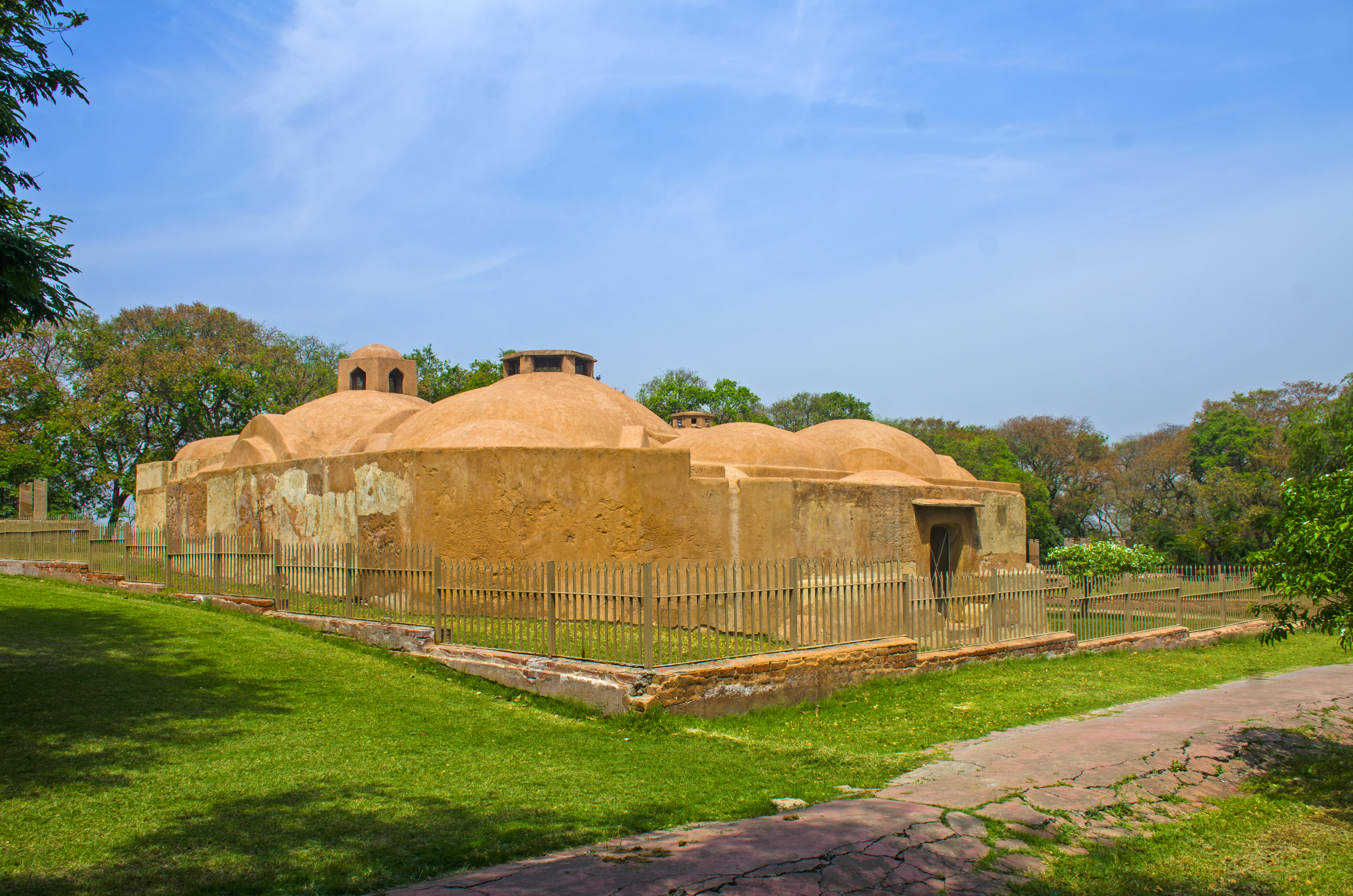
Hammam inside Shahi Qila, Jaunpur

=== Greece ===
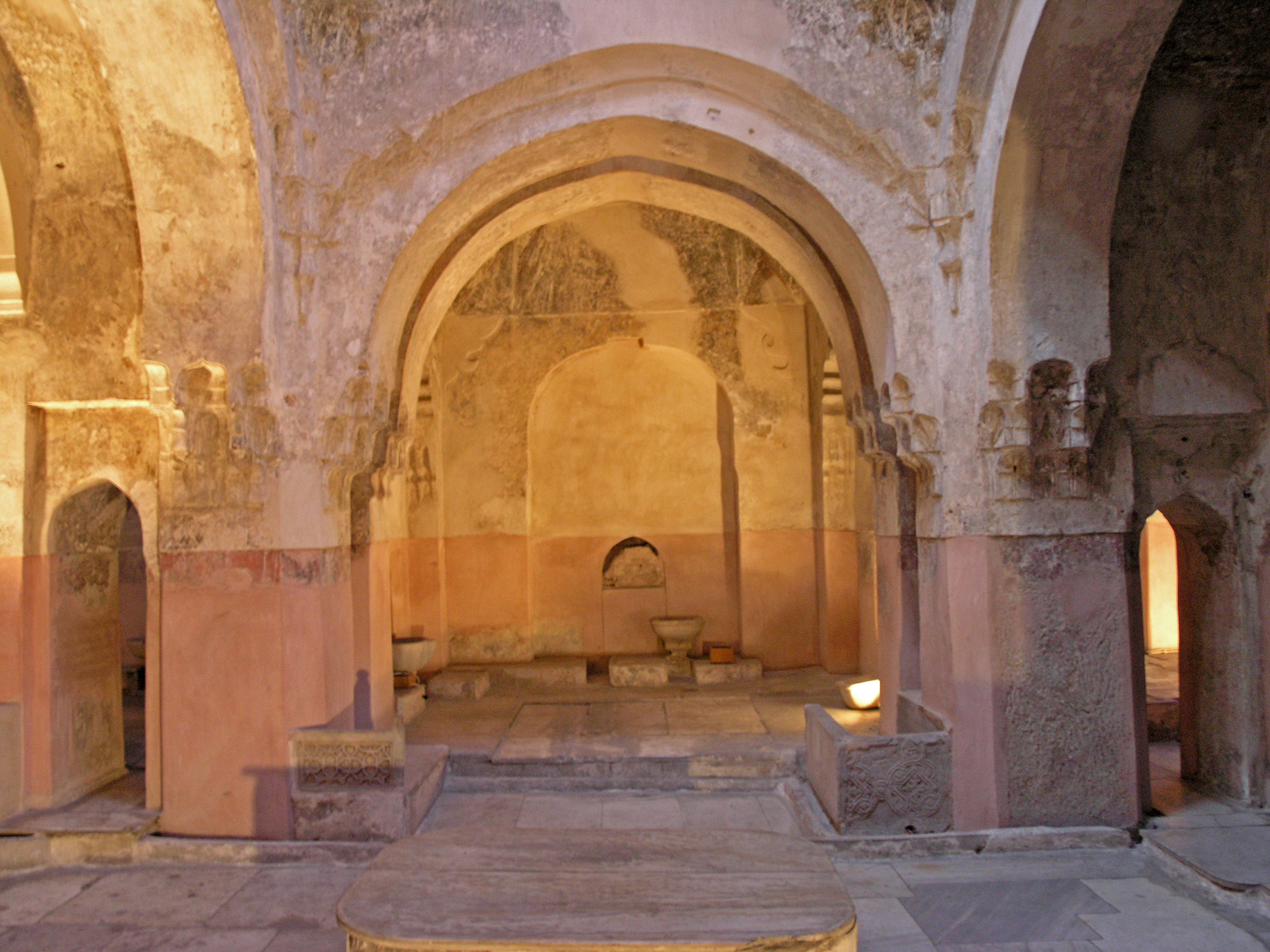
Hot room of the Bey Hamam in Thessaloniki, Greece, built in 1444

Greece once had many historic hammams dating from the Ottoman period, from the late 14th century to the 18th century. Two of the oldest remaining examples are the Gazi Evrenos Hamam in Giannitsa, dating from 1392, and the Oruç Pasha Hammam in Didymoteicho, dating from 1398. Most have been abandoned, demolished or survive in a state of decay, but recently a growing number have been restored and converted to serve new cultural functions as historic sites or exhibitions spaces. A 2004 study by Elena Kanetaki counted 60 remaining hammam buildings on Greek territory.

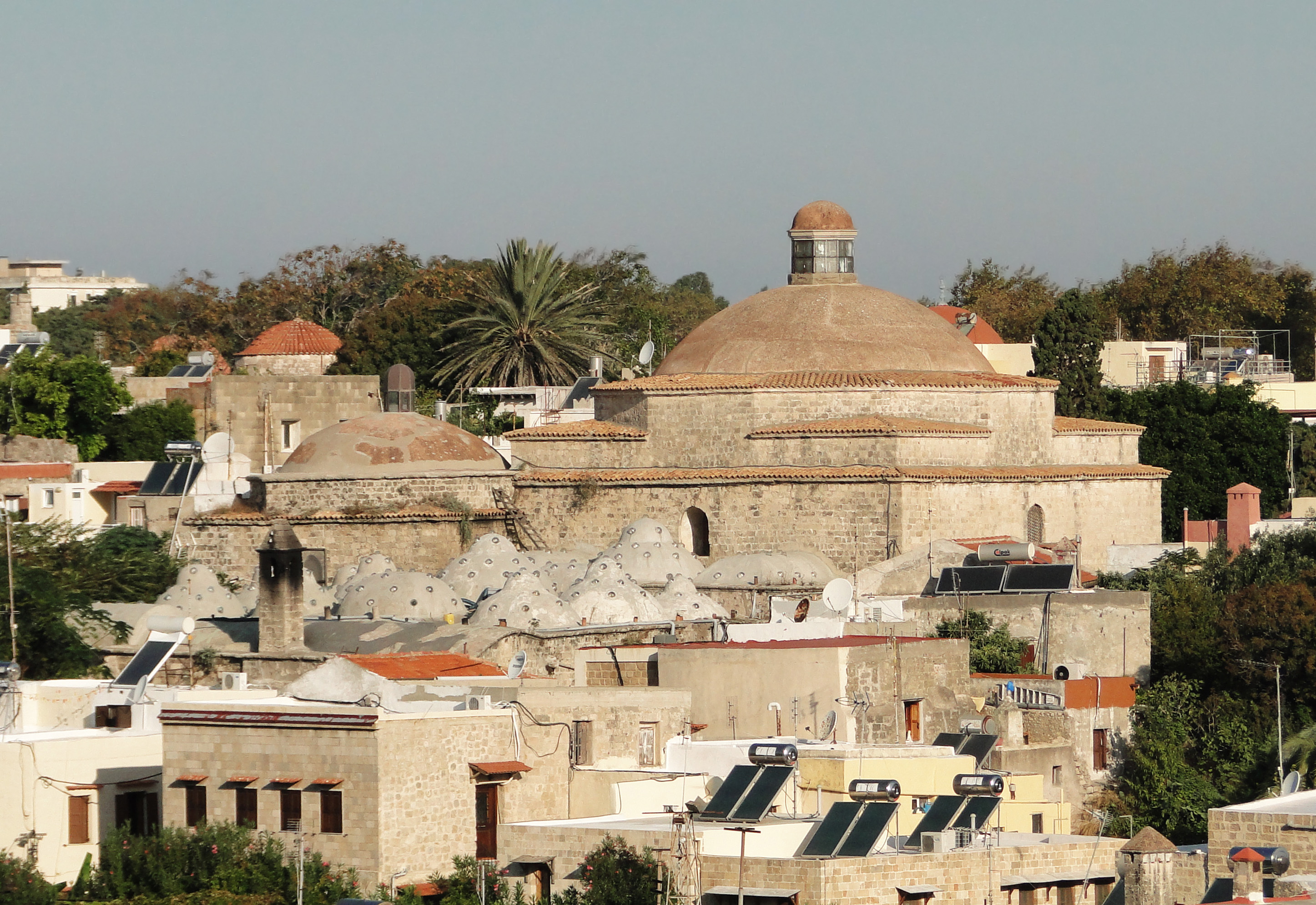
Domes of the 16th-century Yeni Hamam on the skyline of Rhodes

In Thessaloniki, formerly a major Ottoman city, the Bey Hamam was built in 1444 by Sultan Murad II. It is a double bath, for men and women, with notable architectural decoration. The baths remained in use, called the Baths of Paradise, until 1968. They were restored by the Greek Archaeological Service and are now used as a cultural venue. The late 16th-century Yeni Hamam has also been partially restored and now serves as a music venue. The Pasha Hamam, also known as the Phoenix Baths, was built circa 1520 or 1529 during the reign of Suleiman the Magnificent and operated until 1981. It now houses archeological finds from construction work for the Thessaloniki metro.

Elsewhere in Greece, the Abid Efendi Hamam, built between 1430 and 1669 near the Roman Forum in Athens, restored in the 1990s and converted to the Center of Documentation in Body Embellishment. In Rhodes, a double bath called the Yeni Hamam dates from the 16th century and was restored in 1992–1995. It is now one of only two hammams still operating as a bathhouse in Greece.

=== Cyprus ===
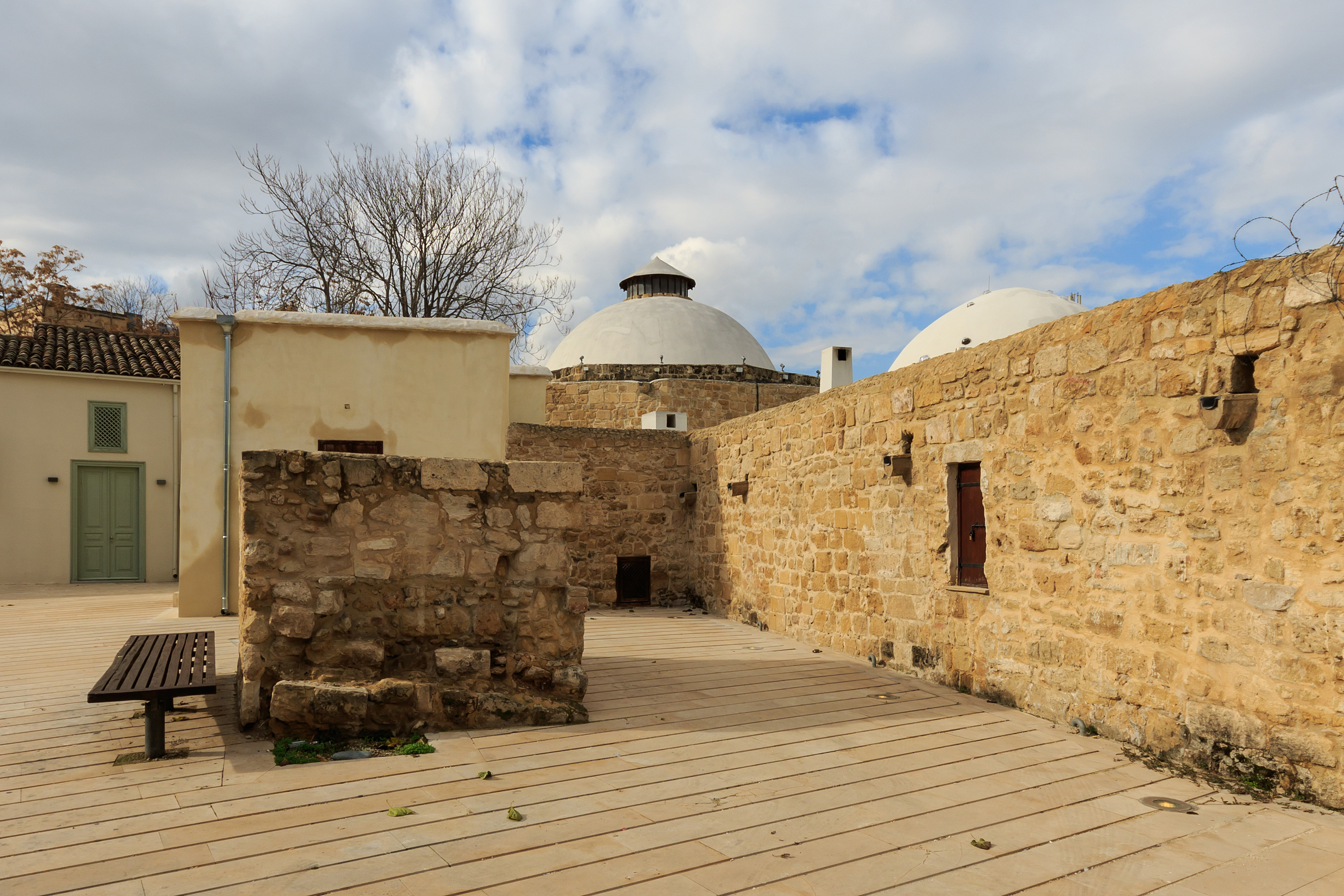
Ömeriye Hamam, Nicosia, Cyprus

The Omeriye Baths in Nicosia/Lefkosia, Cyprus, date to the 15th century and form part of the larger complex of the Ömeriye Mosque (dedicated to the Caliph Omar). The complex was founded by Lala Mustafa Pasha in the 1570s, soon after the Ottoman conquest of Cyprus, repurposing the 14th-century Augustinian church of St. Mary which was damaged in the Ottoman siege. The hamam was restored in 2002–2004 as part of the Lefkosia Master Plan and is still in use today. In 2005 it won a Europa Nostra award for conservations.

On the Turkish side of the Cypriot border in Lefkoşa, the Büyük Hamamı dates from the same period and is still in operation for men and women.

=== North Macedonia ===
Some significant historic Ottoman hammams have also been preserved in North Macedonia. Two of the major examples in Skopje are now part of the National Gallery of Macedonia: the Daut Pasha Hamam (built in the late 15th century) and the Čifte Hammam (mid-15th century).

=== Bulgaria ===
The city of Plovdiv, which was the most important city in the area during Ottoman rule, had eight baths in the mid-17th century when Evliya Çelebi visited. Of these, only two have survived . The best-preserved is the large Chifte Banya or Çifte Hamam (also known as the Ancient Bath), which now serves as an art gallery. It was built in the 1460s, probably by Isfandiyaroğlu Ismail Bey, the deposed ruler of the Isfendiyarid Beylik in Anatolia. It is one of the largest preserved Ottoman hammams in the Balkans and its decoration includes some muqarnas.

=== Hungary ===
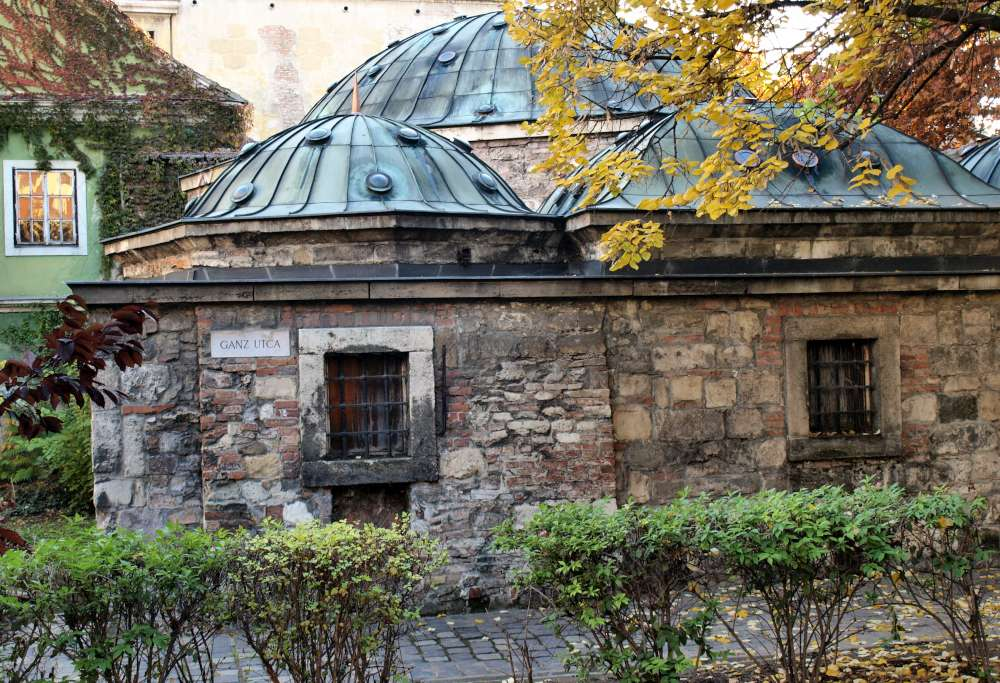
Király Baths building on Ganz Street, Budapest

Budapest, the 'City of Spas', has four hammams, all from the 16th century: Rudas Baths, Király Baths, Rácz Thermal Bath, and Veli bej (Császár) Bath (reopened to the public in December 2012). Currently only Rudas and Veli bej are open to the public, Rácz was closed in 2003 while Király was closed in 2020 for renovations. Eger also has a working hammam, simply called Török Fürdő (Turkish Bath), from the early 17th century.

=== Crimea (Ukraine) ===
In Bakhchisarai, by order of the Crimean Khan Sahib I Geray, the Sarı-Güzel hamam was built in 1532.

== Hammams in Western Europe ==
Aside from Al-Andalus (the mainly Spanish and Portuguese parts of Europe which were Muslim ruled until 1492) modern Western Europe has no legacy of historic hammams. Nevertheless, derivatively named Hummums existed in London's Covent Garden in the first half of the 18th century. Sweating and bathing facilities were located there for some part of that period and, at other times, coffee houses, hotels, and houses of ill repute (bagnios) merged with, or replaced them, until a major fire destroyed them in 1768. But there have been no historic hammam structures in London which could have been considered part of the Islamic hammam tradition.

=== The British Isles in the 19th century ===
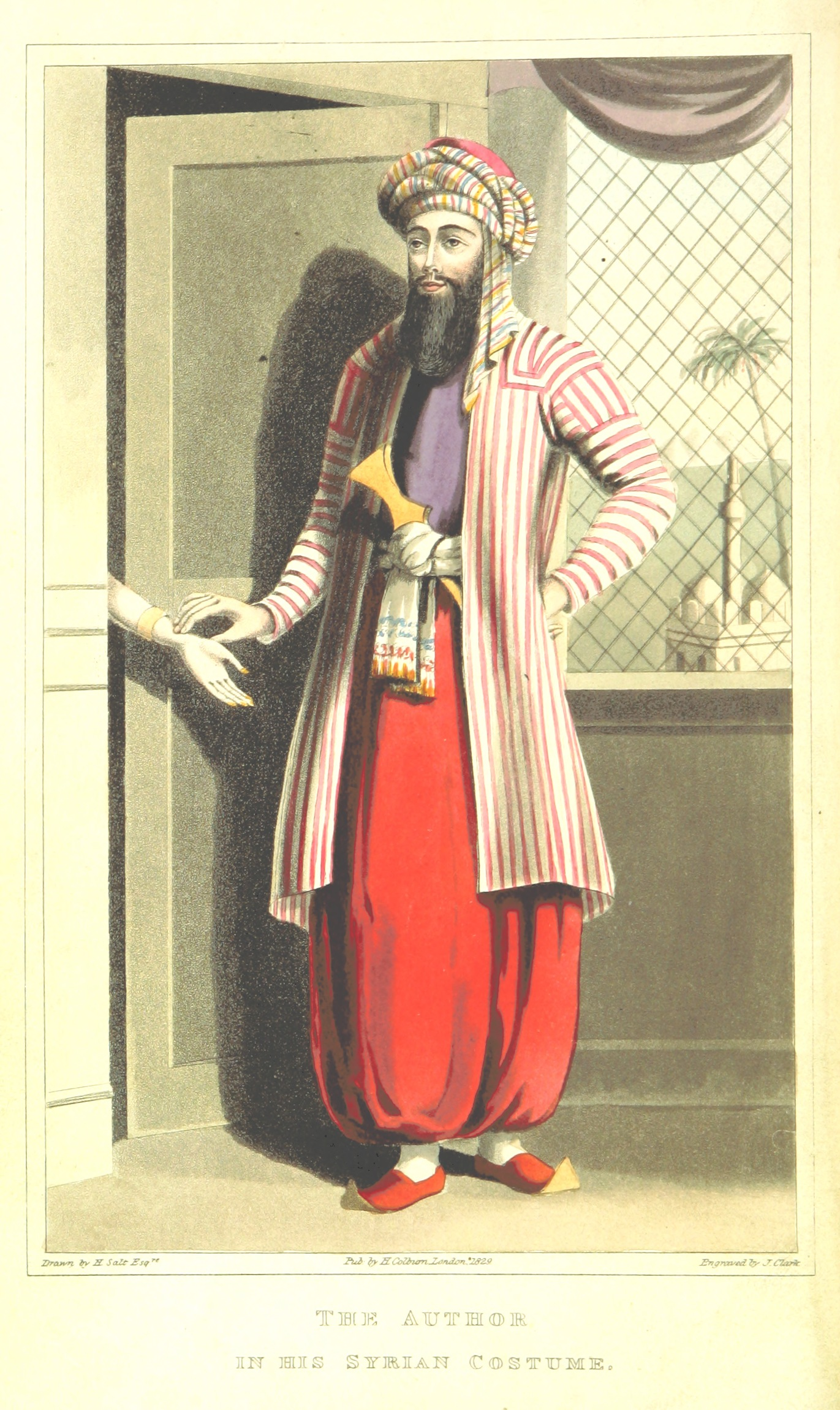
Madden, writer, in Syrian Costume

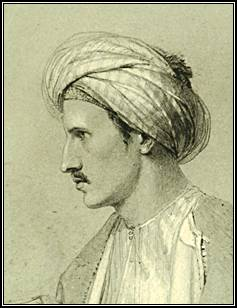
Edward William Lane, orientalist, in costume

In the 19th century, readers of books in English were not ignorant of the existence of hammams, and there was no shortage of contemporary accounts describing what they were, and how travellers were fascinated by them. Authors such as Richard Robert Madden (in 1829), Edward William Lane (in 1836), and, in lighter vein, William Makepeace Thackeray (in 1846), had described them in their books, though most were typically orientalist in approach. In 1828, an anonymous (and still unknown) author self-published Strictures on the personal cleanliness of the English, with a description of the hammams of the Turks, &c. in a limited edition of 250 copies. It was distributed by the radical publisher of The Republican, Richard Carlile, who had realised that in Strictures the author was not denigrating the Turks in the manner of orientalist authors; on the contrary, he was positioning them as a people to be emulated, by describing customs which his readers should adopt themselves. The unknown author wrote that he had wanted "to erect baths at the expense of government in different parts of London, after the manner of the Roman thermæ, publicly endowed like hospitals for the use of the people," and that in 1818 he had unsuccessfully tried to interest George III in his project.

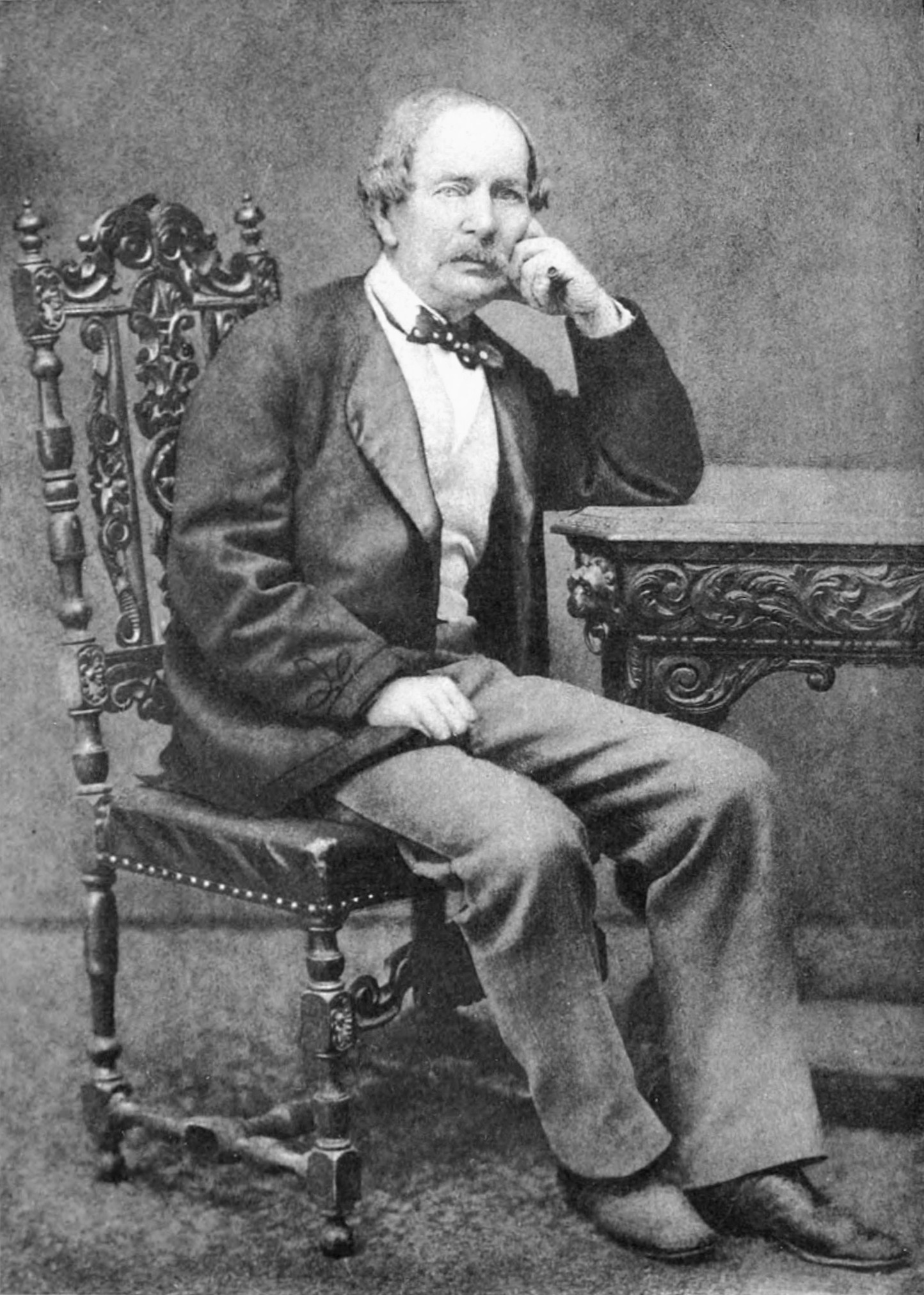
David Urquhart

In 1850, David Urquhart's travel book, The Pillars of Hercules, was published. This recounted his travels in Morocco and Spain in 1848. Two chapters described the hammams of Morocco and Turkey in considerable detail, and Urquhart became an advocate of what were then known in the English-speaking world as "Turkish baths" because those most often described in travel books were located in Turkey and the Ottoman Empire.

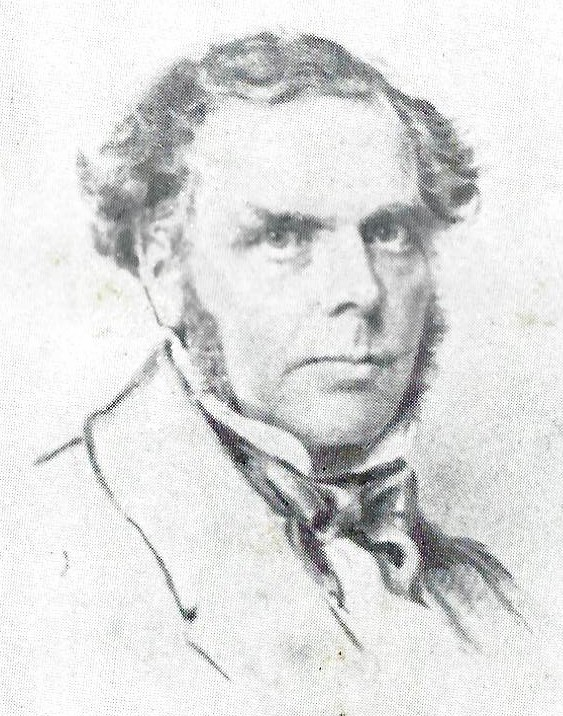
Dr Richard Barter

The book had no direct impact on the construction of a hammam until it was read in 1856 by Dr Richard Barter, an Irish physician and hydropathist. Barter, to the consternation of orthodox hydropathists, was already using the vapour bath cabinet therapeutically at St Ann's, his hydropathic establishment near Cork. He immediately realised that the bath described by Urquhart was a major improvement on his vapour cabinets. He contacted Urquhart and offered him men, money, and materials, "besides a number of patients upon whom experiments might be made", if he would visit St Ann's, and build one for their use.

This first experimental beehive-shaped bath was unsuccessful, mainly because it had not been possible to heat the air to the required high temperature. This is the only documented 19th century attempt to build a hammam in Western Europe, after which the attempt was abandoned.

Instead, Dr Barter sent his architect, also named Richard Barter but unrelated to him, to Rome to study how the ancient thermae were constructed there. On his return he designed and supervised the building of what has become known as the first Victorian Turkish bath—a hot-air bath using hot dry air instead of the moist air of the hammam.

Back in England the following year (1857), Urquhart helped build the first such bath in Manchester. As a Turcophile, he argued strongly for calling the new bath a Turkish bath, though others unsuccessfully maintained that it should be called an Anglo-Roman bath, or as in Germany and elsewhere, the Irish, or Irish-Roman bath.

But all future 19th century hot-air baths in the British Isles were either based on the Irish-Roman model or later, and then only occasionally towards the end of the century, on the Russian steam bath. After Barter's initial attempt, the hammam is not recorded as appearing again in Western Europe until after World War I.

=== France, post World War I ===
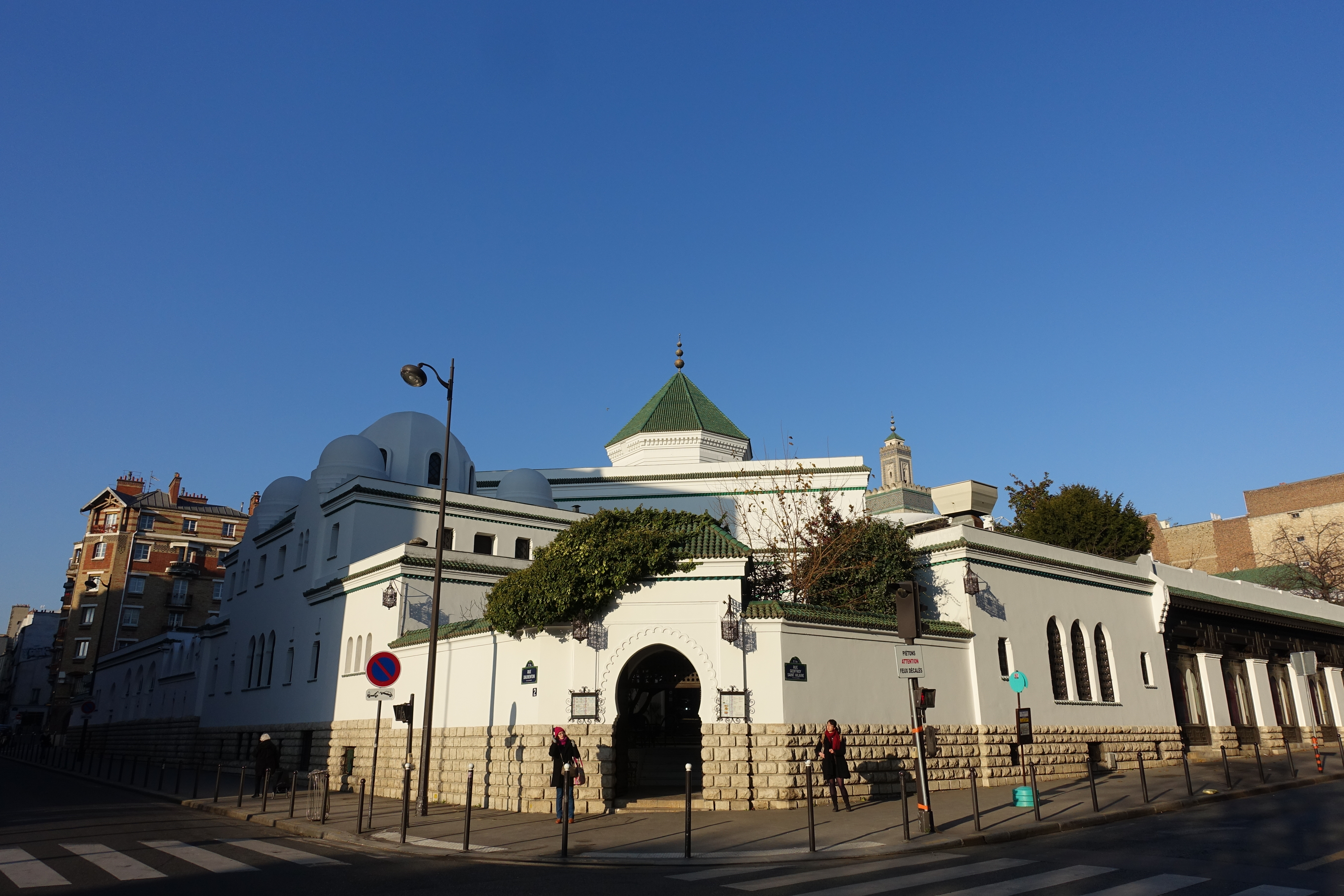
Grande Mosquée de Paris, rue Geoffroy-Saint-Hilaire, 2016. The separate entrance through a tearoom leads to the hammam (on the left)

The first permanent mosque in modern France, La Grande Mosquée de Paris et Institut musulman, was not opened till 1926. Covering an area of 7,500 square metres, it also includes a madrasa (school), library, conference hall and, beyond the Moorish gardens, an annexe housing a hammam and a tearoom with a direct entrance to the street.

The building commemorates the many thousand Muslims who died fighting for France during World War I. It was built by architects Robert Fournez, Maurice Mantout, and Charles Heubès, following the plans of Maurice Tranchant de Lunel, General Inspector of Fine Arts in Morocco. Constructed in reinforced concrete, the decorative green tiles, earthenware, mosaics, and wrought iron work come from Maghreb countries, and were fitted by craft workers from there. In 1983, the building was inscribed in the Base Mérimée, the database of French monumental and architectural heritage, created and maintained by the French Ministry of Culture.

The hammam was originally open at separate times for men and women. It can be seen as it was in the mid-1960s, because it appears in a scene in Gérard Oury's French-British comedy film La Grande Vadrouille. Bathers are shown being served drinks while reclining on long continuous cushioned platforms which are divided into cubicles by bead curtains. The cool wading pool in one of the hot rooms also appears.

Some time after a major refurbishment in the 2010s, the hammam's admission policy changed. It appears that the mosque authorities now lease it to a private company which runs it, for women only, as a wellness centre with beauty treatments. (Note: 'Spa therapy: navigating Paris' hammam scene' Hip Paris. Retrieved 12 May 2024 is an illustrated account of a visit to the mosque's hammam made by the writer Badaude in 2021.)

=== Europe, post World War II ===
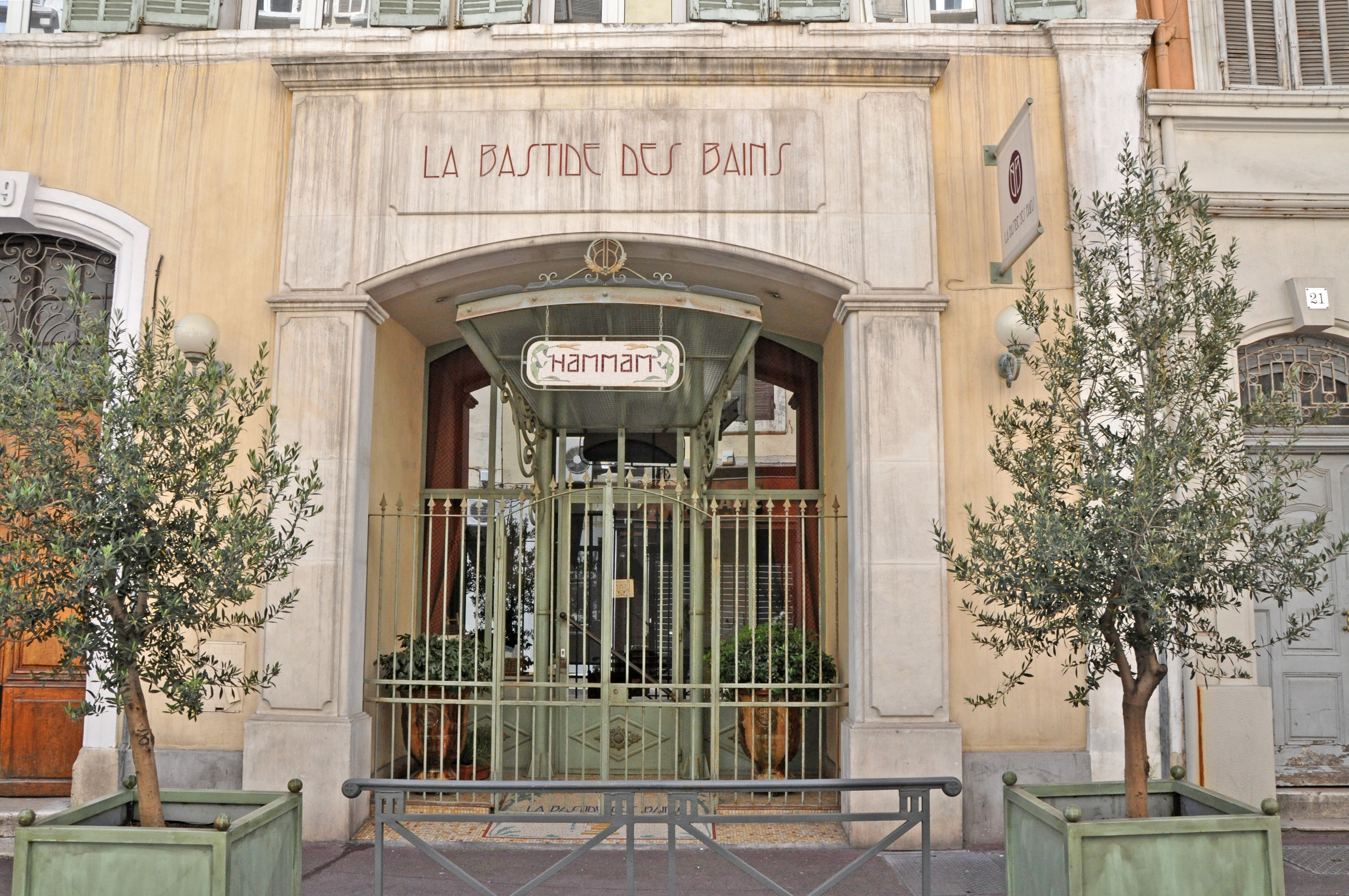
La Bastide des Bains, rue Sainte, Marseille (France)

The second half of the 20th century saw a new generation of war-weary, air-travelling holidaymakers returning from Turkey and other countries where they had discovered the hammam. But their discovery was not specifically seen as an extremely important part of Islamic culture, but as what had become, as a result of diminishing local use, a significant tourist leisure attraction.

It was not long before baths based on the internal appearance of the hammam, with its central area and göbek tasi (belly-stone), started appearing in European hotels, health spas, and even as standalone hammam establishments. In Spain, for example, after nearly five centuries' absence, hammams are reappearing in cities such as Cordoba, Granada, Seville, and Madrid. Drawing on centuries of mixed traditions, their signs in Spanish and English, they are promoting a new view of the hammam to a younger generation of bathers, thereby attracting both tourists and locals, a trend currently developing around the continent.

== Cultural representations of the hammam ==
=== Art ===
Within the Muslim world, hammams appeared in some artistic depictions such as Persian miniatures, including the work of Kamāl ud-Dīn Behzād (or Bihzad).

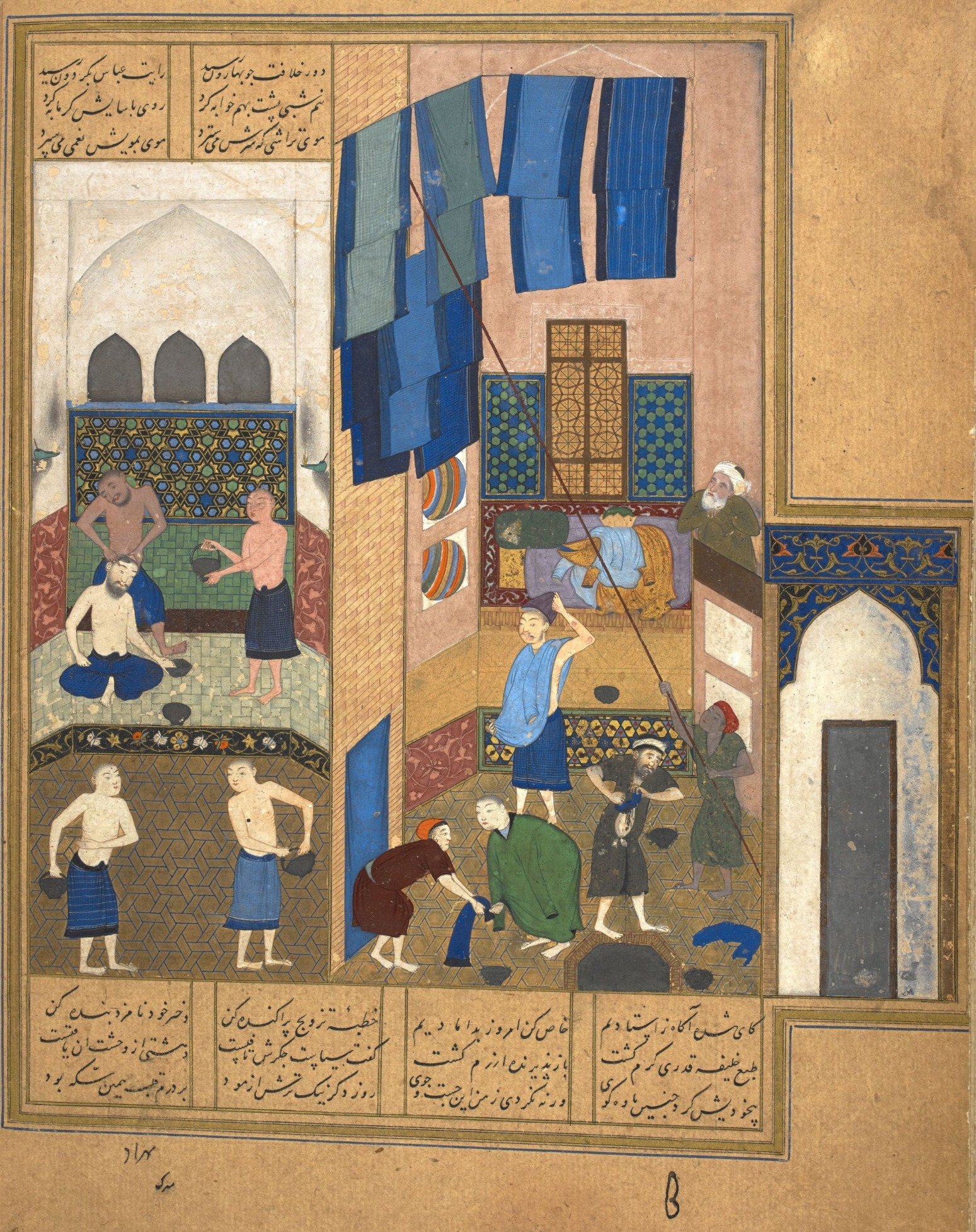
Bathhouse scene by Kamāl ud-Dīn Behzād, 1495

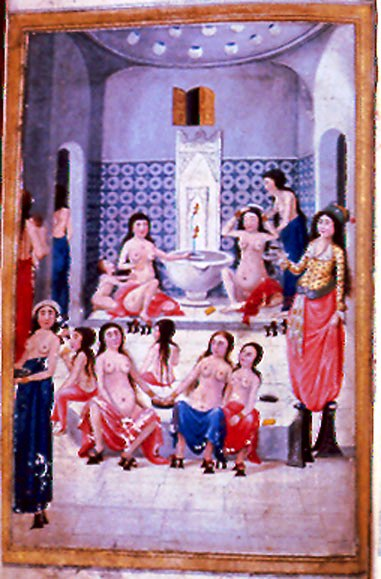
Women's bath, illustration from Husein Fâzıl-i Enderuni's Zanan-Name, 18th century

In Western art, especially in the context of 19th-century Orientalism, the hammam is often portrayed as a place of sexual looseness, disinhibition and mystery. These Orientalist ideas paint the Arab or Turkish "other" as mystical and sensuous, lacking morality in comparison to their Western counterparts. A famous painting by Jean Auguste Dominique Ingres, Le Bain Turc ("The Turkish Bath"), depicts these spaces as magical and sexual. There are several women touching themselves or one another sensually, while some dance to music played by the woman in the centre of the painting. More recently, Sylvia Sleigh, has painted a gender-reversal take on Ingres's painting. Her version also counters Ingres's orientalist fantasy brothel figures by using her husband and some of her friends as real life models in more realistic surroundings.

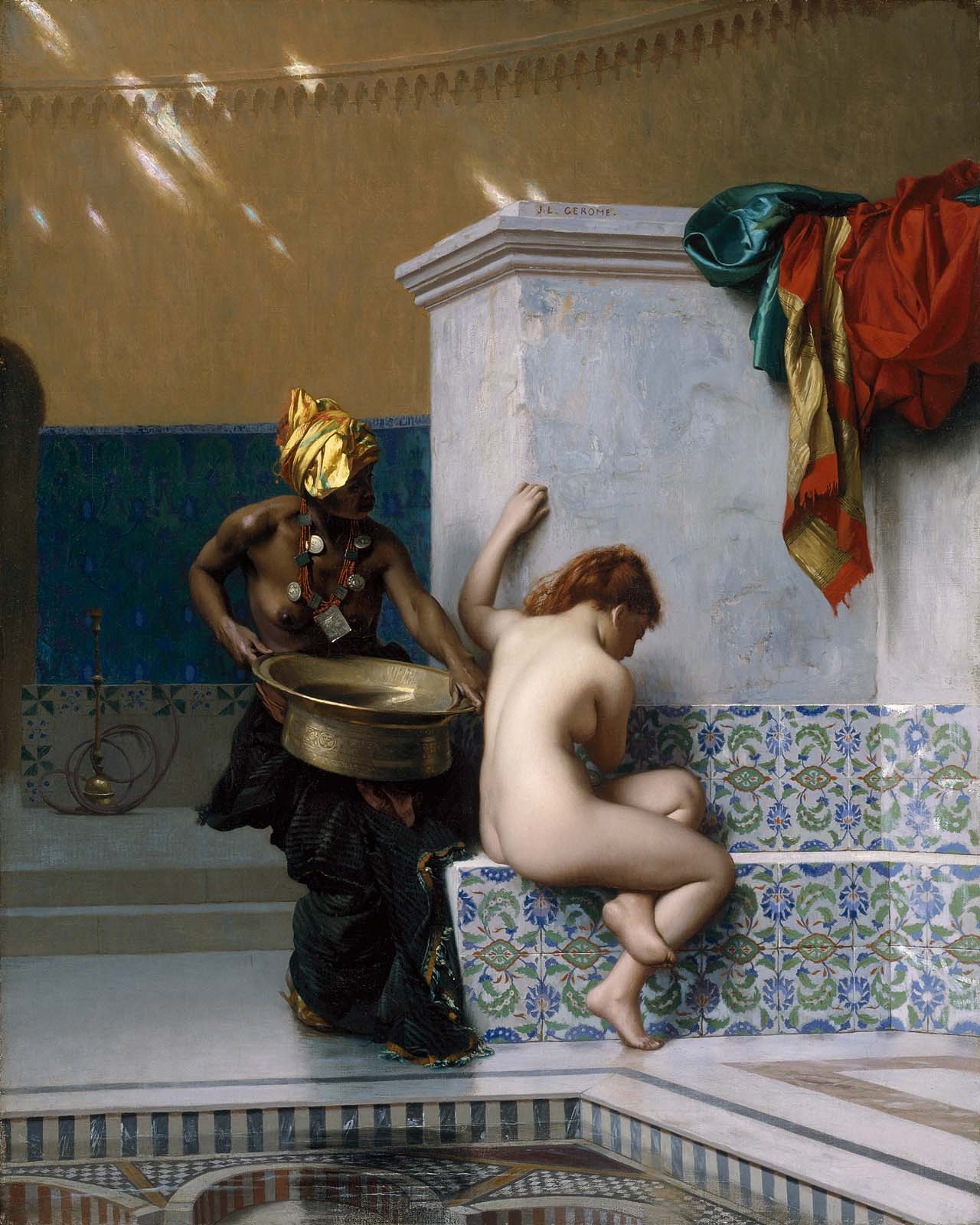
Moorish Bath, by Jean-Léon Gérôme, 1870

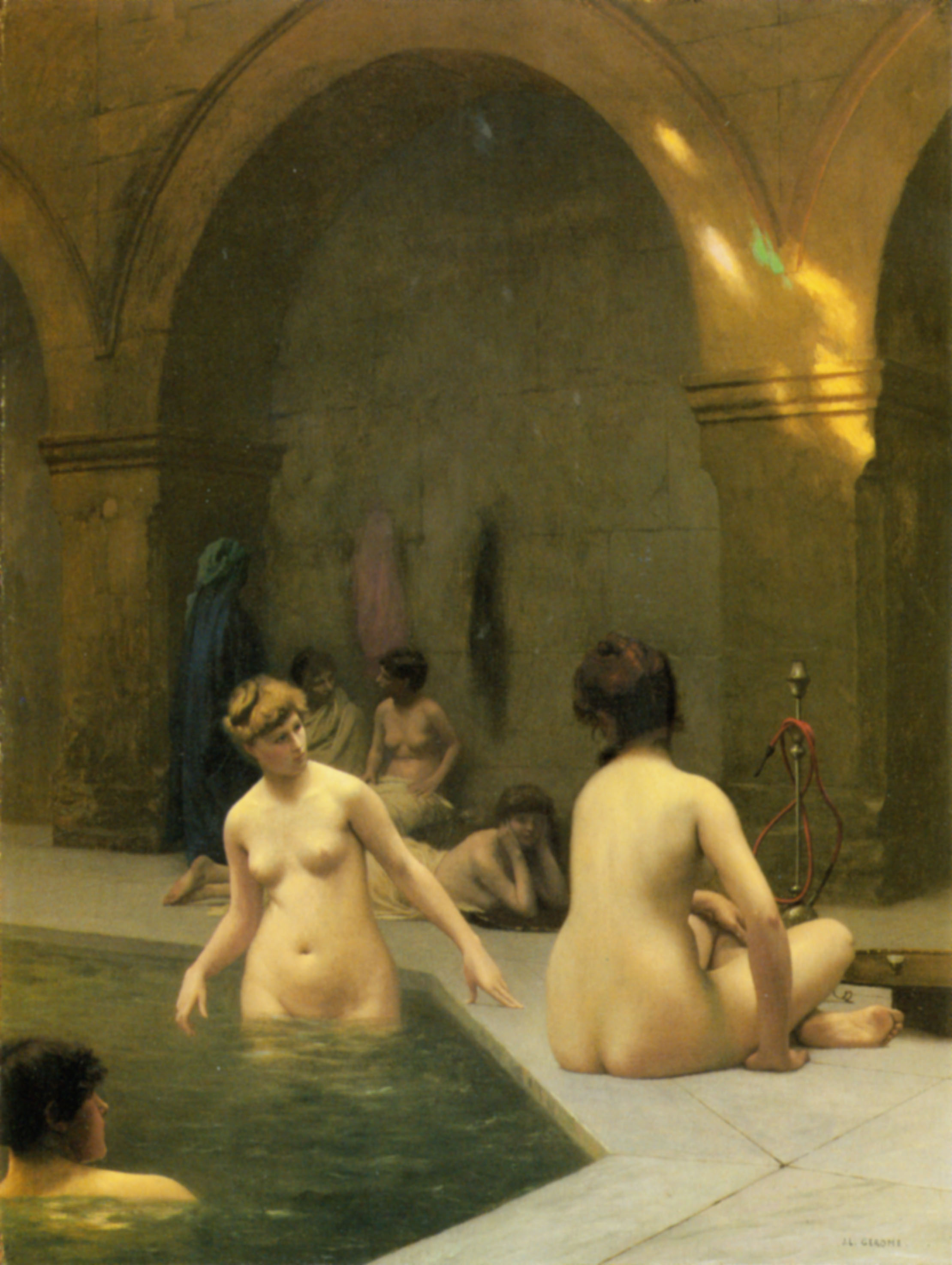
Baigneuses, by Jean-Léon Gérôme, circa 1889

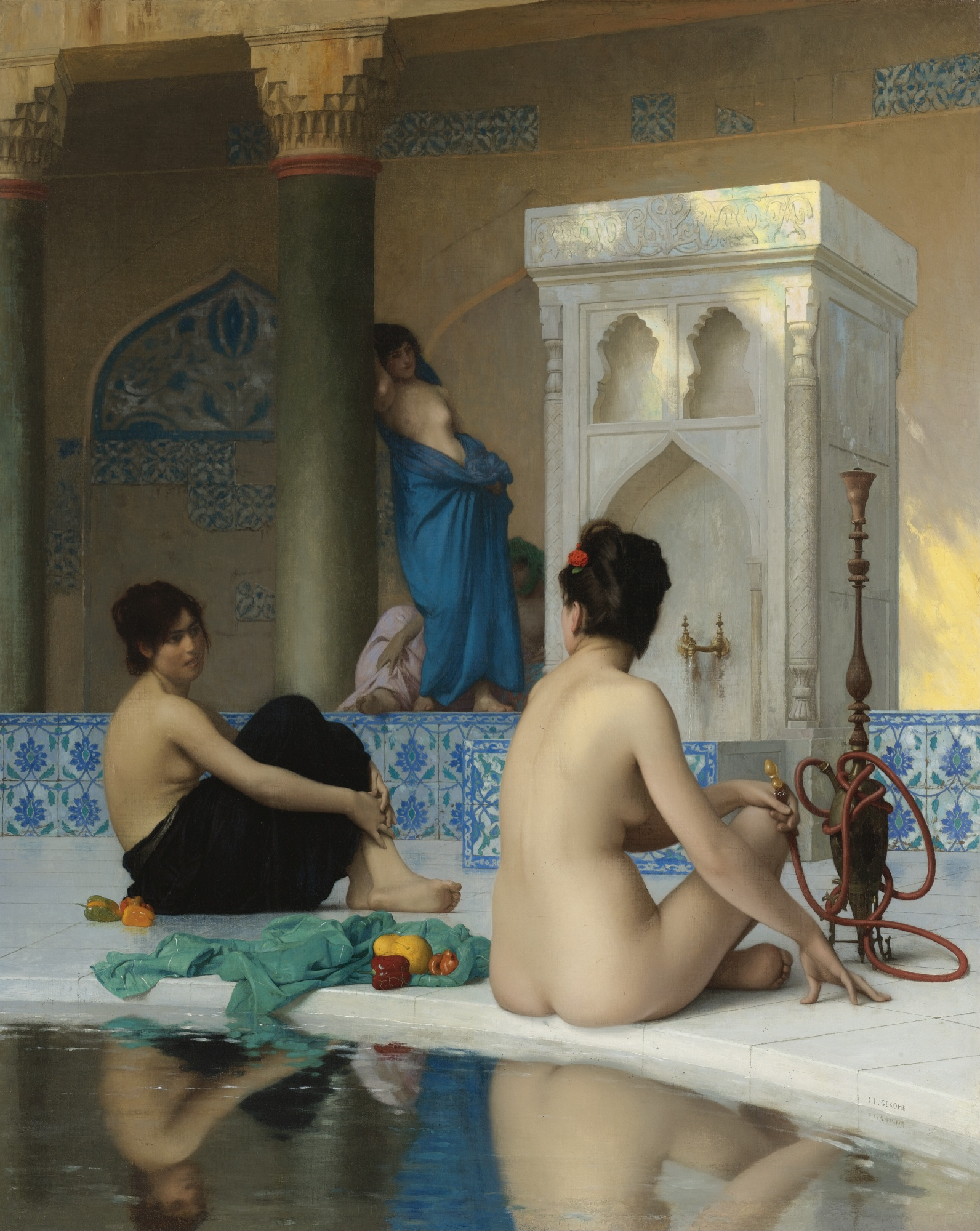
Après le bain, by Jean-Léon Gérôme

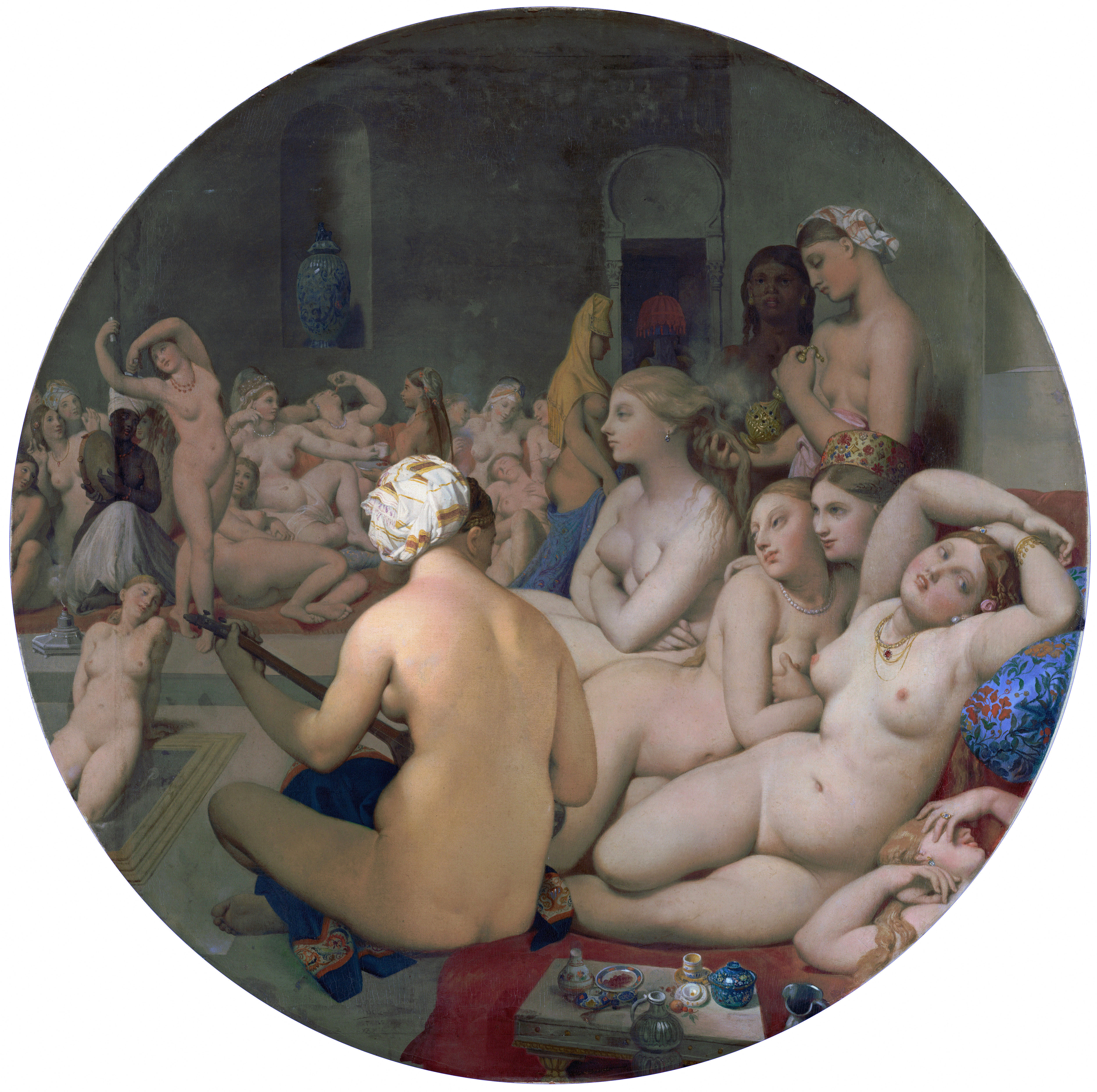
Jean Auguste Dominique Ingres: The Turkish Bath, 1862 (Louvre, Paris)

Sylvia Sleigh: The Turkish bath, 1972 (Smart Museum, University of Chicago)

=== Movies ===
Turkish director Ferzan Özpetek's 1997 film Hamam told the story of a man who inherited a hammam in Istanbul from his aunt, restored it and found a new life for himself in the process.

In Zélie Elkihel's 5 minute animation, Hammam, a French-Moroccan woman shares a memory of her first enlightening visit to a hammam when she was 12.

=== Literature ===
Visiting a hammam was very much a part of the Western tourist experience from the 18th century onwards and many travellers left accounts of what they had seen in the bathhouses. One such was the British diplomat's wife, Lady Mary Wortley Montagu, who visited a hammam in Sofia in Bulgaria in 1717 and wrote about it in her Turkish Embassy Letters, first published in 1763. In 1836 another British woman, the traveller and novelist, Julia Pardoe, left a description of taking part in the hammam ritual in Constantinople/Istanbul in her book The City of the Sultan and Domestic Manners of the Turks, published in 1838. In 1814 another wife of a British ambassador to the Ottoman Empire, Henrietta Liston, visited a hammam in Bursa and wrote about it in her belatedly published diary. In her Romance of the Bosphorus, Dorina Clifton, a British woman who grew up in Constantinople/Istanbul, left a rare account of a visit to a local hammam in Kandilli, one of the Bosphorus villages, before the First World War. Several more contemporary accounts of using hammams in Turkey appeared in Tales from the Expat Harem, published in 2005.

== See also ==
- Gellért Baths
- Hydrotherapy
- Jjimjilbang, the Korean equivalent
- Moorish Baths, Gibraltar
- Onsen and sentō, the Japanese equivalents
- Steam shower
- Sauna
