= Mahmut Pasha Mosque, Eminönü =

Mosque in Fatih, Istanbul, Turkey

Mahmut Pasha Mosque
- Mahmut Paşa Camii
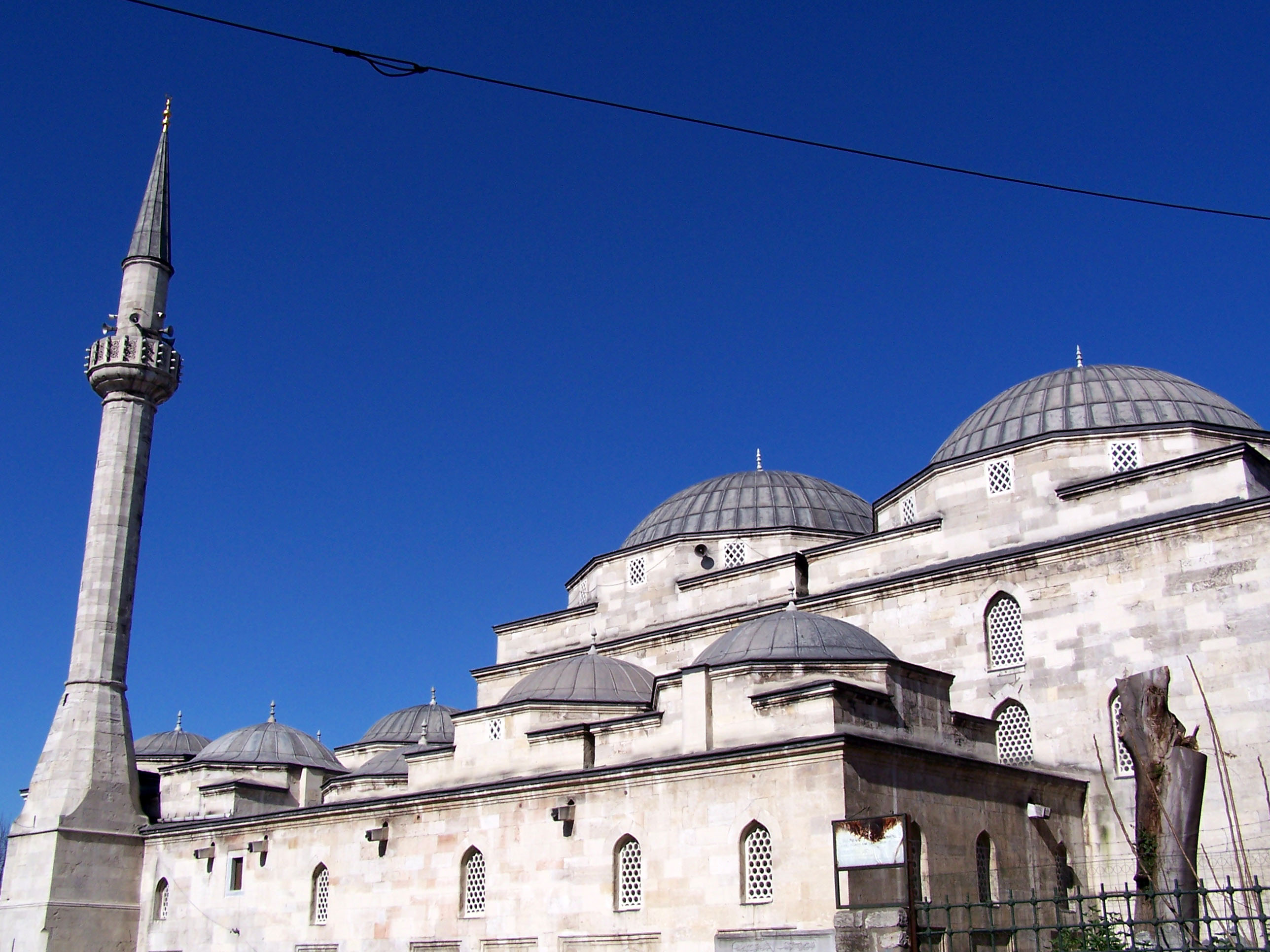

- Location within the Fatih district of Istanbul

Religion
- Affiliation: Sunni Islam

Location
- Location: Eminönü, Istanbul, Turkey
- Coordinates: 41.011354°N 28.971235°E

Architecture
- Type: mosque
- Completed: 1464

Specifications
- Dome: 2
- Dome dia. (outer): 12.5 m (41 ft)
- Minaret: 1
- Materials: ashlar

The Mahmut Pasha Mosque (Turkish: Mahmut Paşa Camii) is a 15th-century Ottoman mosque near the Grand Bazaar in the Fatih district of Istanbul, Turkey.

== History ==
The mosque was commissioned by the Greek Mahmud Pasha, the grand vizier of Sultan Mehmet II, who converted to Islam. Completed in 1464, it was one of the first buildings within the city walls built specifically as a mosque. Up to that time, most of the early mosques in the city were converted Byzantine churches.

The waqf (endowment) of the mosque and its associated charitable buildings was quite extensive, covering a number of different buildings across the surrounding district. This suggests that Mehmet II may have entrusted Mahmud Pasha with developing this district near the commercial heart of the city, just east and north of the area which would become the Grand Bazaar. The mosque was thus the centrepiece of this development.

The mosque was completely restored and reopened in 2021. Restoration of the tomb was ongoing in 2022.

== Architecture ==
The mosque is designed in the Bursa style with the main space covered by a number of identical domes. This is an early Ottoman style which was soon abandoned in favour of a single large dome with smaller extensions. In this case, the main space is a 2x1 rectangle covered with two identical domes, each with a diameter of 12.5 metres (41 ft). The mihrab and minbar are located on the short side of the rectangle. The areas on either side are each covered by a simple sloping roof.

The entrance to the mosque is similar to that of a Byzantine church, with an outer porch (exonarthex) and an inner porch (esonarthex), each covered by five small domes. The columns holding up the outer porch were originally marble but were replaced by the present stone ones in the 18th century after damage by an earthquake. The mahfil was added in the 19th century, and the mihrab and minbar replaced; as a result, they are in a different style to the rest of the mosque.

The octagonal mausoleum (türbe) of Mahmud Paşa in the grounds of the mosque is dated AH 878 (1473-74 CE) on an inscription at the entrance. Its exterior is decorated with tiles forming geometric patterns in turquoise and indigo colours, a feature which is unique in Ottoman architecture in Istanbul.

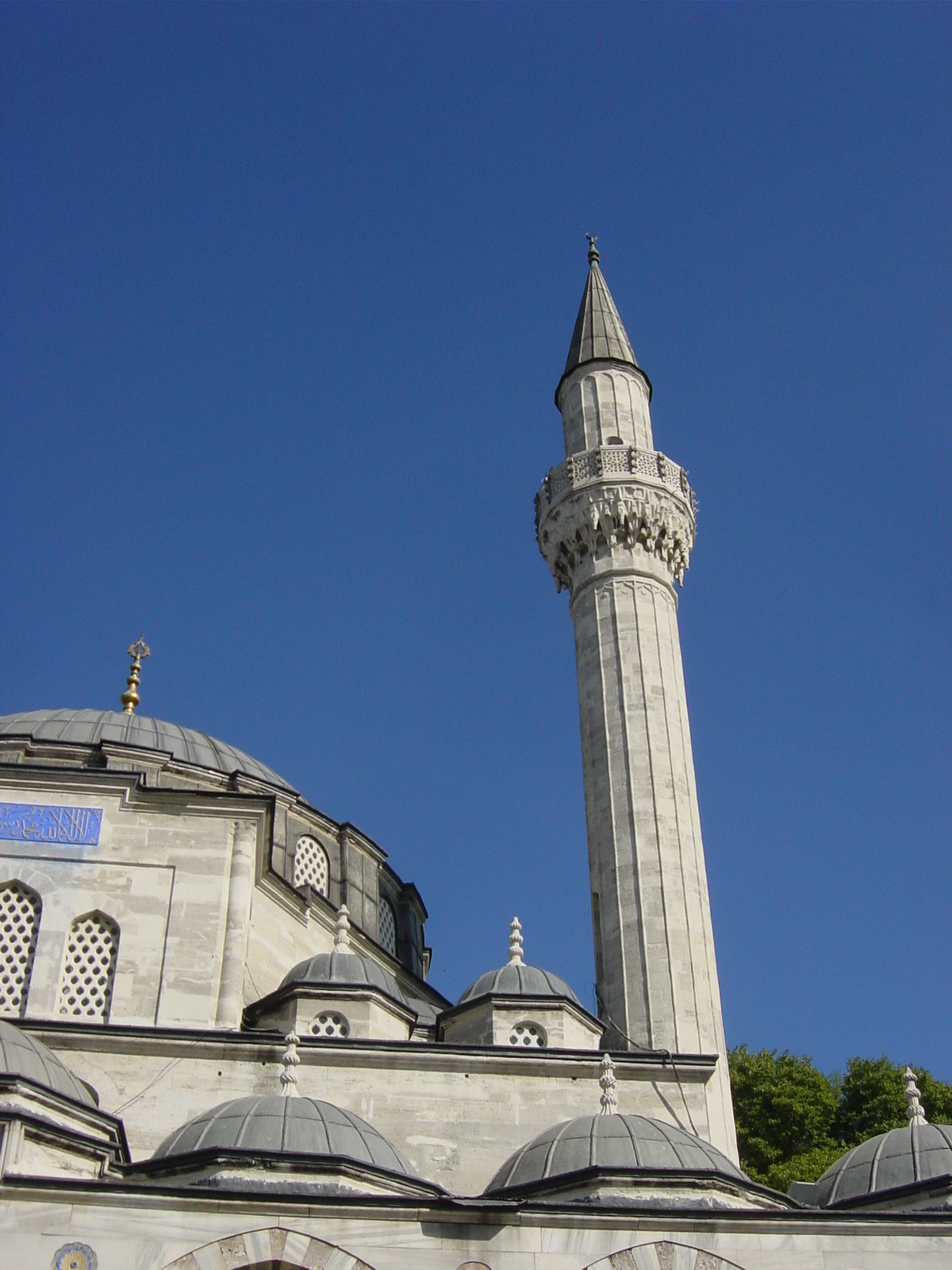
View of the minaret of the mosque

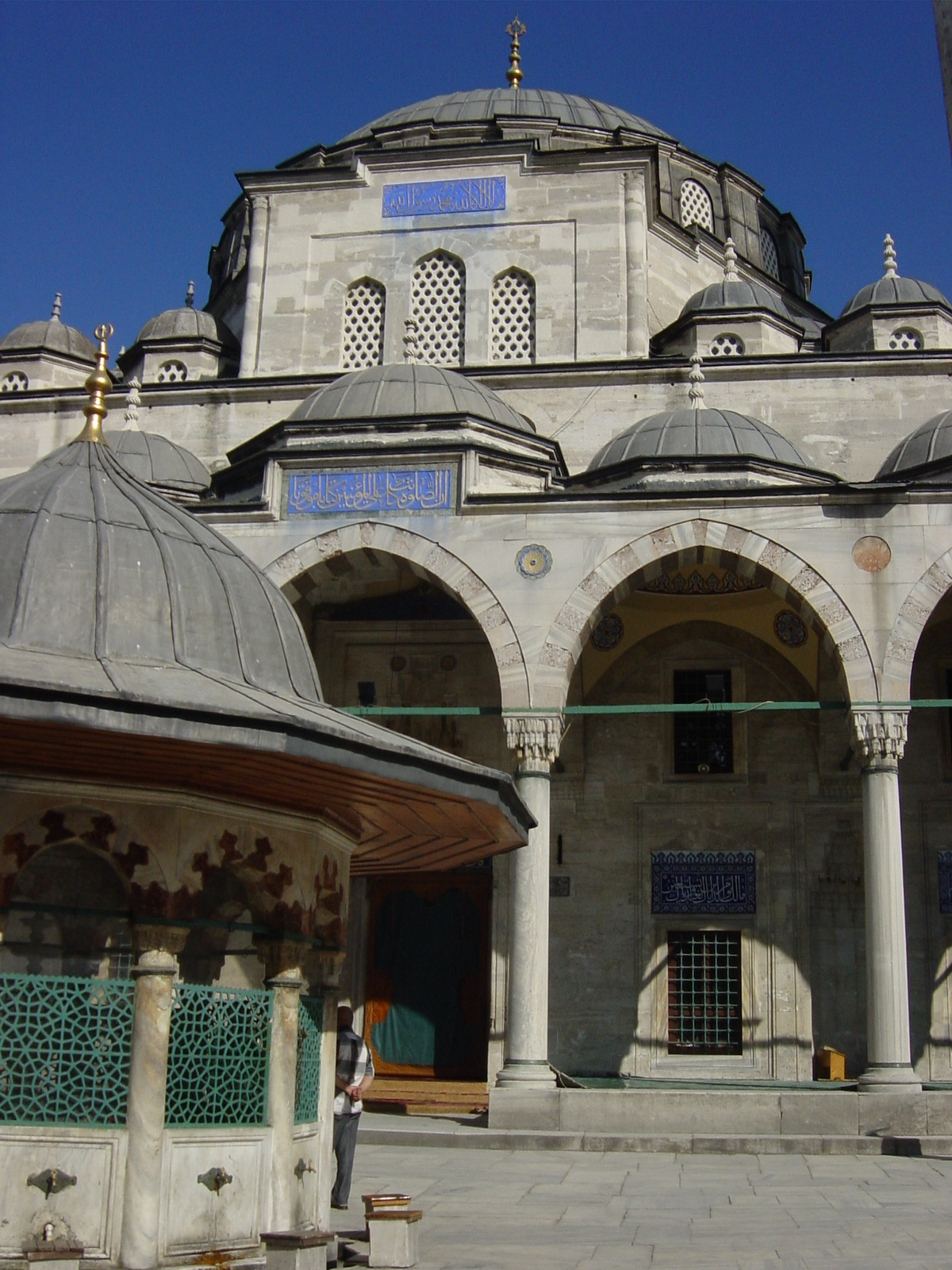
Courtyard of the mosque

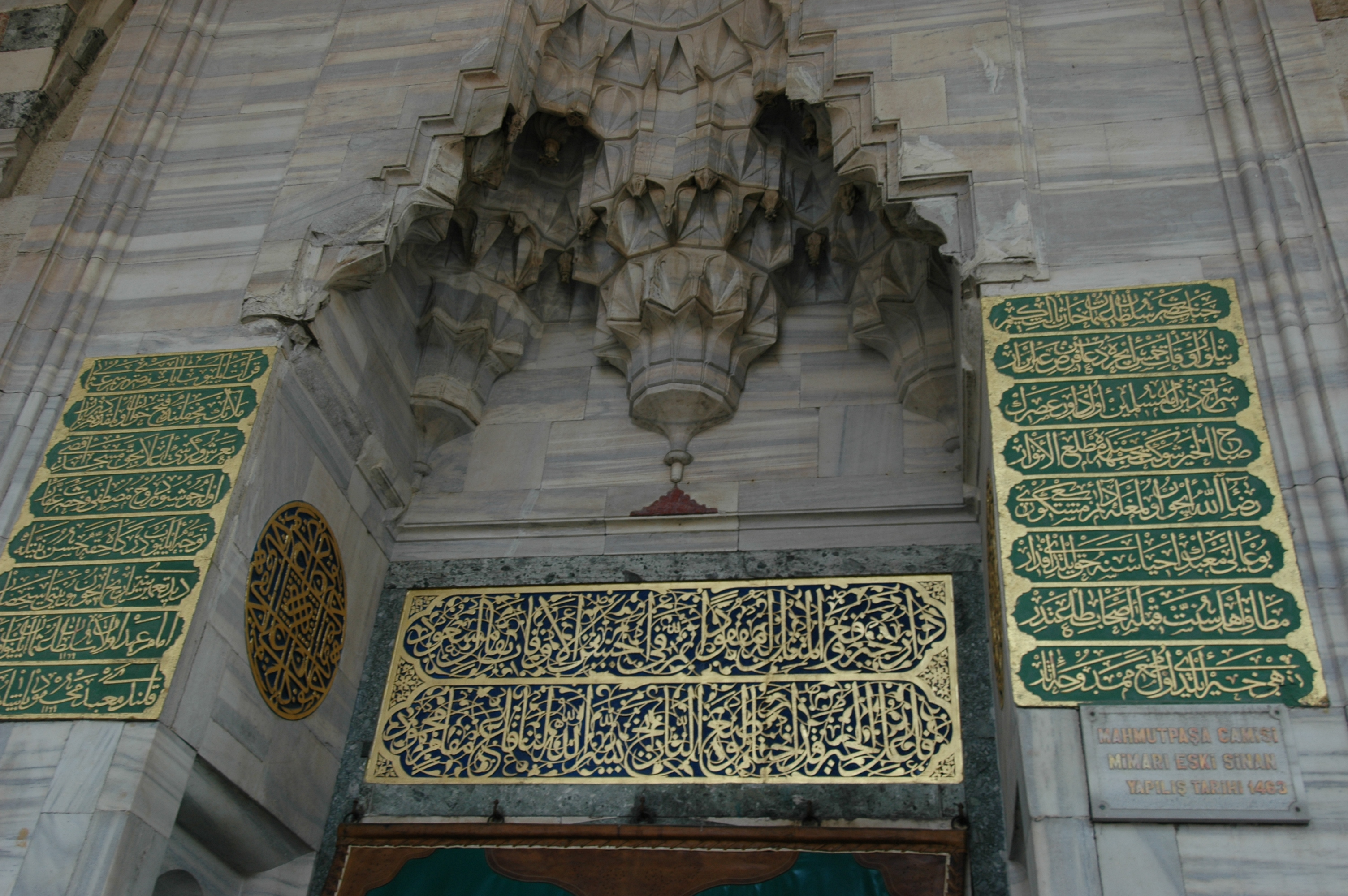
Muqarnas and calligraphy over the mosque's entrance portal

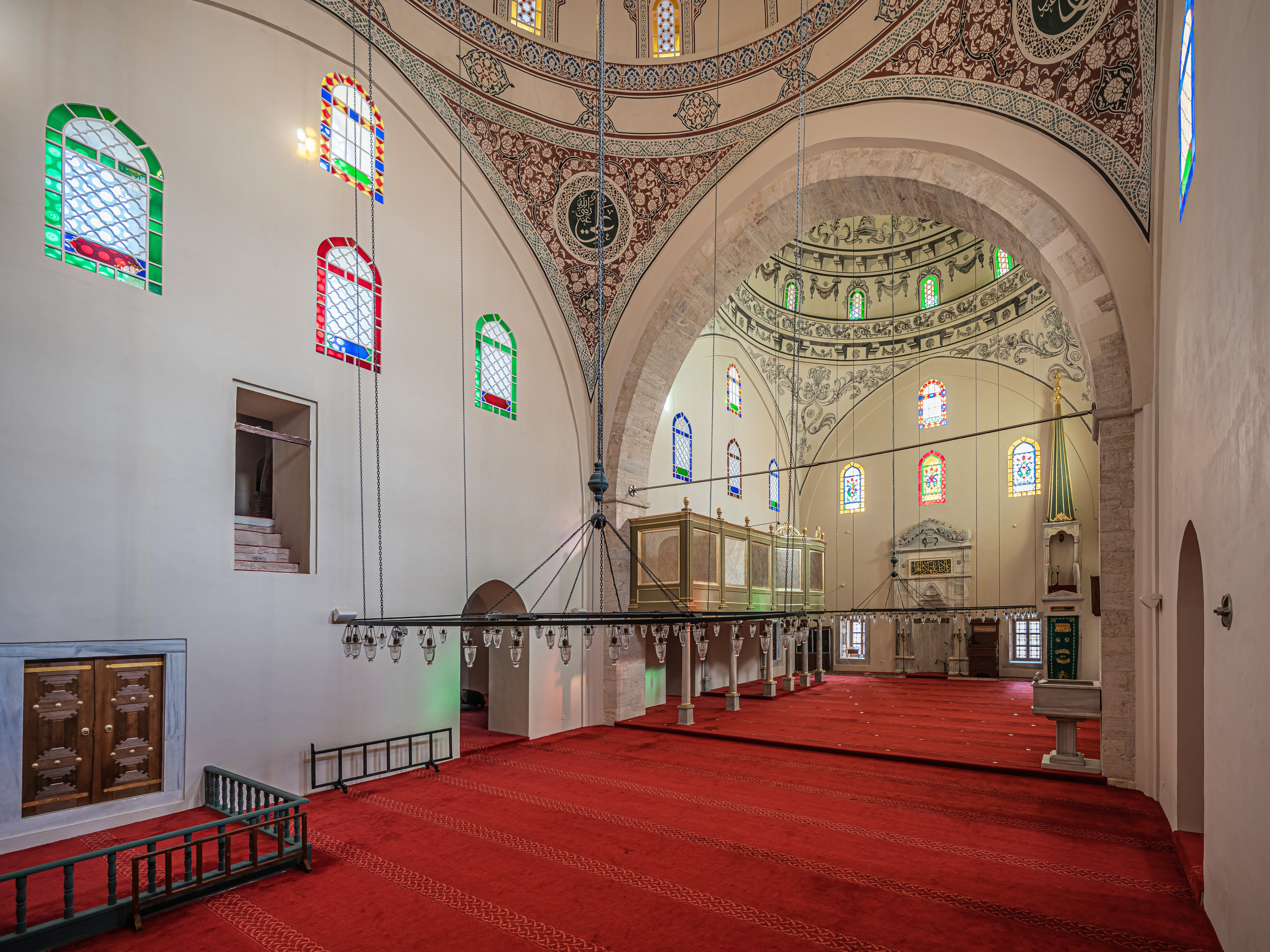
Mahmut Pasha Mosque interior

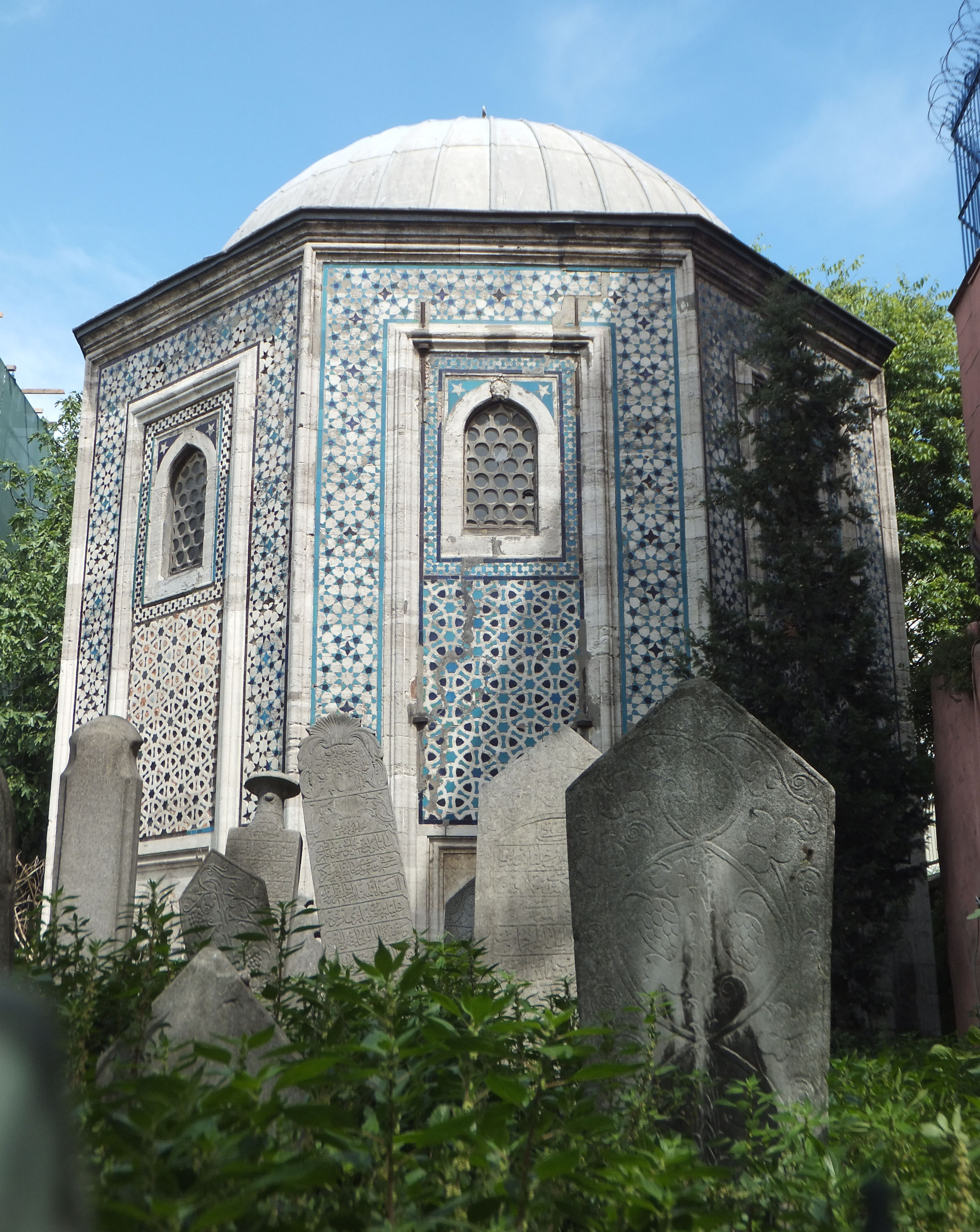
The türbe (mausoleum) of Mahmud Pasha, behind the mosque

== Other buildings of the complex ==
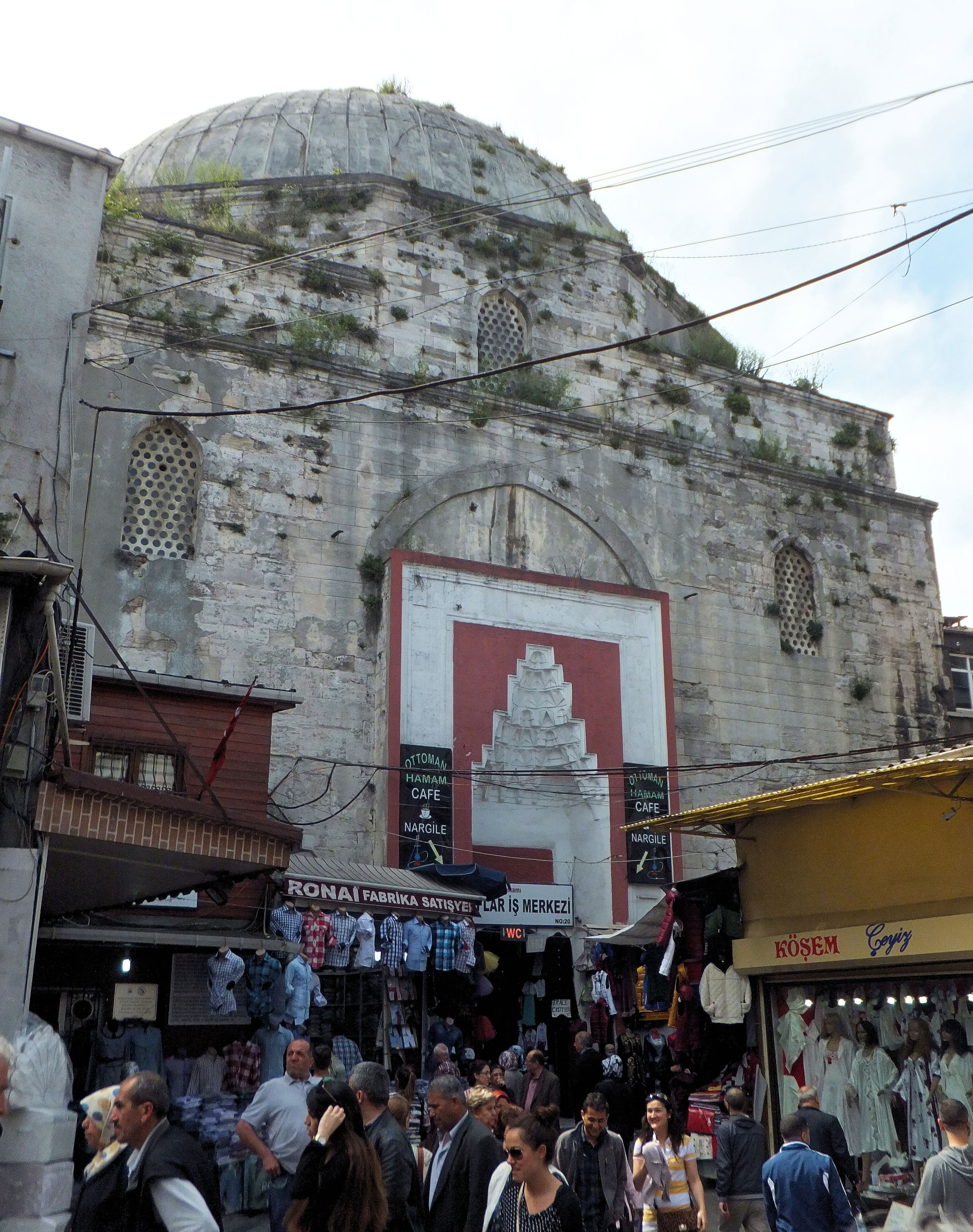
The Mahmut Pasha Hamam today, located northeast of the mosque

Like many other Ottoman mosques, the Mahmut Pasha Mosque was part of a larger charitable complex, a külliye, composed of multiple buildings which were governed together through a waqf foundation (Turkish: vakıf). The külliye of Mahmut Pasha included, in addition to the mosque and the mausoleum, a hammam (public bathhouse), a han or caravanserai, a madrasa, an imaret (soup kitchen), a mahkeme (courtroom), and a mekteb (elementary school). The waqf also specified the management of 27 houses, about 100 shops, and various other lodgings, storehouses, and stables, making this waqf foundation particularly wealthy for its kind. Of these, only the hammam and the caravanserai, and one section of the madrasa, have survived to the present day. The various buildings were scattered in different locations across the surrounding district. The revenues generated by the hammam and the caravanserai contributed to the upkeep and operations of the mosque.

The hammam of the complex, located northwest of the mosque, was completed in 1466 CE, making it one of the oldest hammams in the city. Its architecture and layout is highly similar to the Tahtakale Hamam built by Mehmet II slightly earlier. It was originally a double hammam, meaning it had separate (but adjacent) facilities for men and for women, but the women's section was demolished at some later date. The hammam was also damaged by fire in 1755 and was restored in 1953. It served as a storage depot for a time but now serves as a shopping centre.

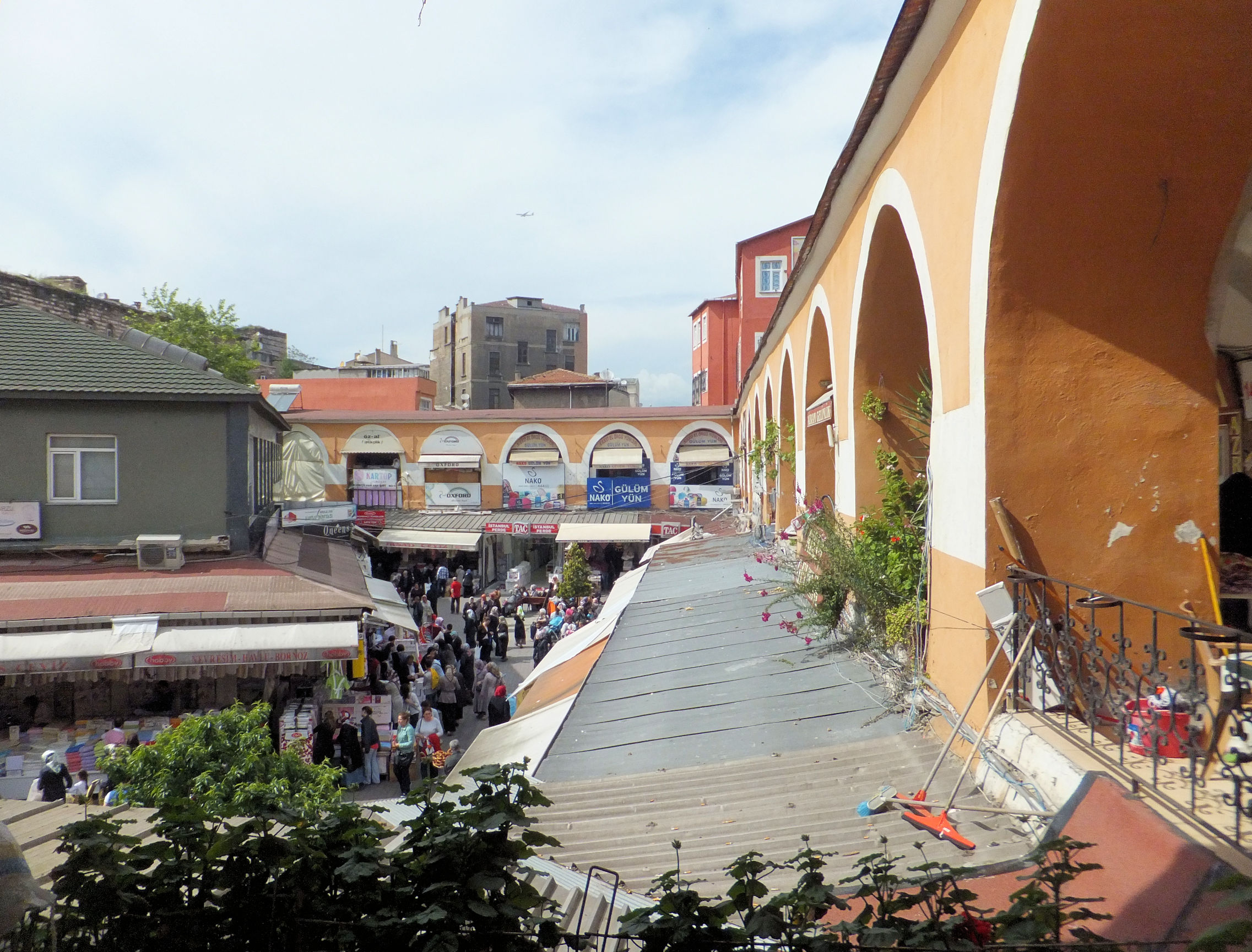
The main courtyard of the Kürkçü Han today

The caravanserai of the Mahmut Pasha complex, located north of the hammam, is known today as the Kürkçü Han ("Caravanserai of the Fur Merchants"). It was completed in 1467 and is the oldest surviving caravanserai in Istanbul, albeit with some modifications and restorations over time. The building contributed to the revenues of the mosque's waqf foundation by collecting rent from the shops and offices which occupied its many rooms (which at one point numbered 167). The caravanserai is still used by shops and businesses today.

== See also ==
- List of mosques
- Ottoman architecture
