= Vezneciler Hamamı =

Coordinates: 41.0112°N 28.9613°E

Vezneciler Hamamı is a historic hamam (bathhouse) located in the UNESCO World Heritage Site of the historic area of Istanbul. The hamam was built by Sultan Bayezid II in 1481. It is located slightly north of the larger Bayezid II Hamam.

The bath was unique for being constructed on the second floor rather than the ground floor, and the bath's waters were thought to be a curative for jaundice. Ottoman writer Evliya Celebi (1611–1682) noted that the bath had two entrances for men and women, although this feature cannot be seen today. The bath was renovated in 1950 and is still in use today. It remains a mixed gender hamam, open to both men and women.
