= Siege of Mytilene =

Siege of Mytilene can refer to one of the following sieges of the town of Mytilene, on the Greek island of Lesbos:

- Siege of Mytilene by the Athenians during the Mytilenean revolt (428–427 BC)
- Siege of Mytilene (333 BC) by the Persians under Memnon of Rhodes during the campaign of Alexander the Great
- Siege of Mytilene (81 BC), by the Roman Republic
- Siege of Mytilene (1462), by the Ottoman Empire
- Siege of Mytilene (1464)
