= Manuel Angelos =

Manuel Angelos or Angelus (Greek: Μανουήλ Ἄγγελος) may refer to:

- Manuel Angelos (after 1195–1212), son of Isaac II Angelos
- Manuel Komnenos Doukas (ca. 1187–ca. 1241), ruler of Thessalonica 1230–1237; Thessaly 1239–1241
- Manuel Angelos Philanthropenos, ruler of Thessaly 1390–1393
