= Alexios Angelos =

Alexios Angelos may refer to:

- Alexios III Angelos (1153–1211), Byzantine emperor from 1195 to 1203
- Alexios IV Angelos (1182–1204), Byzantine emperor from August 1203 to January 1204
- Alexios Angelos Philanthropenos, ruler of Thessaly c. 1373 to his death c. 1390
