= Battle of Larende =

Ottoman victory in Turkey

- Part of the Ottoman wars in Asia
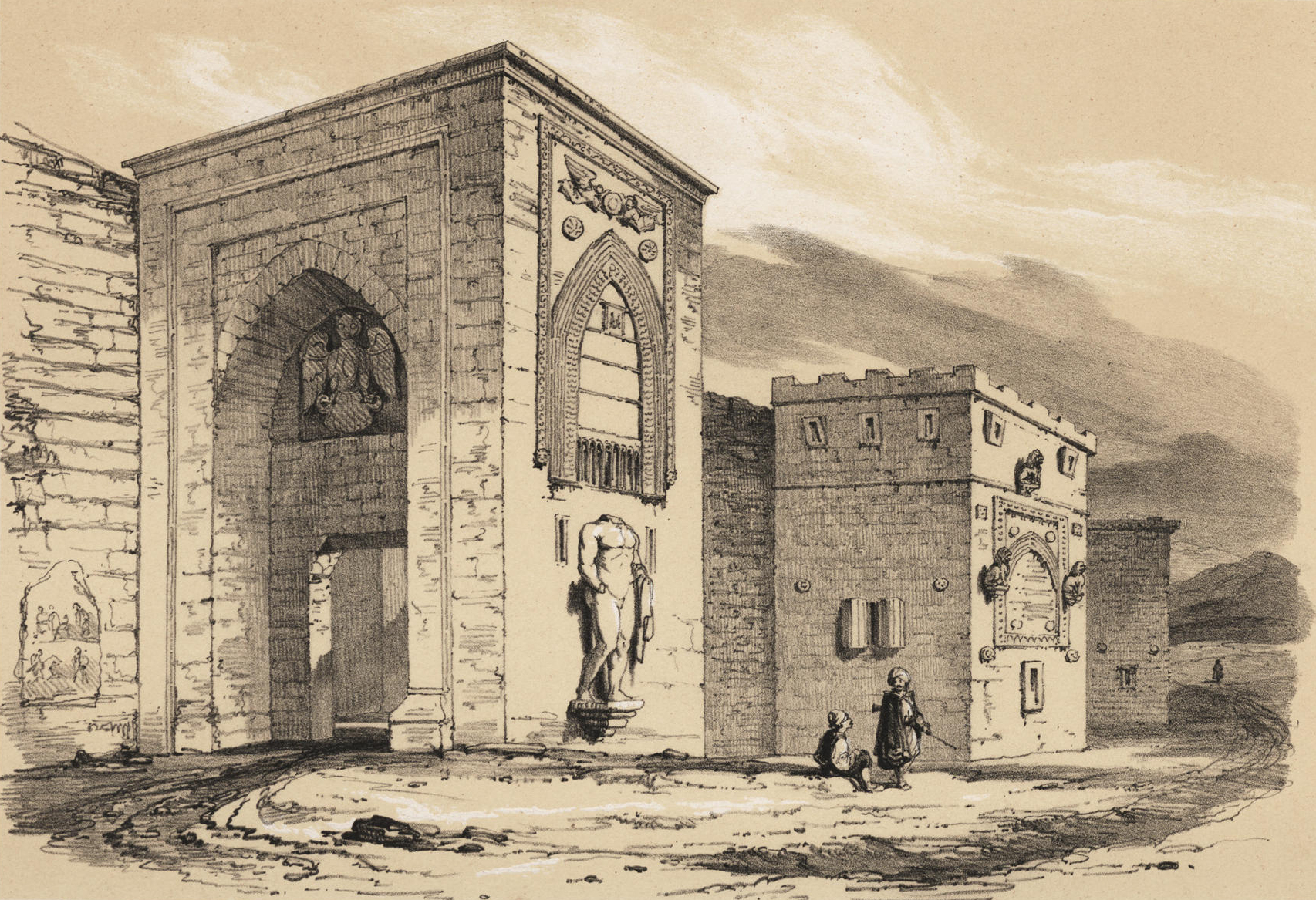
- Konya Citadel
Date	1468
Location	Larende, Konya, Turkey
Result	Ottoman victory

Belligerents
Ottoman Empire	Karamanids; Mamluk Sultanate

Commanders and leaders
Mehmed II; Mahmud Angelović	Pir Ahmed; Kasım of Karaman

Strength
60,000	44,000

Casualties and losses
- 9,400 soldier 4 Beylerbey; 7 Sanjak-bey; 200 Muteferrika

The Battle of Larende, fought in 1468, was the last major confrontation between the two great Anatolian Turkish states of the time—the Karamanids and the Ottomans. The battle symbolized which power would ultimately remain dominant in Anatolia. The lands of Larende, over which the two Turkish rulers fought, have today become one of the settlement areas of Syrians (not to be confused with Larende in Karaman).

== Civil war ==
Karamanoğlu İbrahim Bey had left the throne to his eldest son, Ishak Bey. Upon learning of this, his other six sons rebelled and came before the walls of Konya, laying siege to the city. Finding their father ill there, they attempted to take him to Gevale Castle. However, Ibrahim Bey died on the way (early August 1463). As a result, the Karaman realm fell into turmoil; part of the territory remained under Ishak Bey's control, while another part passed to Pir Ahmed.

Ishak Bey sought support from Uzun Hasan, inviting him to wage war against his brothers and promising to pay him 1,000 florins per day. Uzun Hasan met Ishak Bey in Sivas. Pir Ahmed, unwilling to risk a confrontation with Uzun Hasan, sought refuge in Ottoman lands. Uzun Hasan then devastated the Karaman country, left Kızıl Ahmed there, and concluded his campaign.

Although the new ruler of Karaman—long regarded as the archenemy of the Ottoman dynasty—had come to power with the help of Uzun Hasan, he knew that he could not remain in power for long without the approval of Mehmed II. Meanwhile, as Aq Qoyunlu influence increased in Karaman, the Republic of Venice signed an alliance with the Aq Qoyunlu in 1464 to open a new front against the Ottomans. Faced with this situation, Mehmed II found himself in a difficult position. However, being at least as capable a ruler as Uzun Hasan he began taking measures to prevent being encircled by his enemies.

Mehmed II sent Pir Ahmed Bey, who had taken refuge with him, together with Köse Hamza Bey against Ishak Bey. The combined forces engaged Ishak Bey near Ermenek and defeated him. Ishak Bey abandoned everything and fled to seek refuge with Uzun Hasan. As a result, Pir Ahmed Bey became the sole ruler of the Karaman lands. In gratitude, he ceded Kayseri and several other territories to Mehmed II.

== Riot ==
In the end, Mehmed II reacted with great severity. In a letter he wrote to the Ottoman prince Bayezid II, Pir Ahmed declared that he was a vassal of Mehmed II. With the incorporation of the Karaman lands into Ottoman rule, a gap was created within the alliance formed at this stage in the Mediterranean between the Republic of Venice and the Aq Qoyunlu, effectively severing the vital link between the allies.

However, before long, Pir Ahmed Bey began to oppose Mehmed II. He started encroaching upon Ottoman territories, seizing the produce of certain lands, and even dared to demand the return of Ilgın and its surroundings from Mehmed II. Moreover, Pir Ahmed was obliged to appear annually before the Sultan, kiss his hand, and present gifts. Yet he failed to fulfill these obligations as well.

During this period, Mehmed II and Mahmud Pasha were preoccupied in Albania with Skanderbeg, which prevented them from intervening in Anatolia. Pir Ahmed's secret agreements with the Papacy and Venice were further provocative causes for Mehmed II. For 150 years, the Karaman state had been a dangerous enemy of the Ottomans; the two states had fought numerous wars, which often ended in unreliable peace treaties due to dynastic marriages. Nevertheless, Mehmed II was determined not to tolerate another rebellion, regardless of the reason.

== Battle ==
After finally concluding his Albanian campaigns, Mehmed II decided to launch a military operation toward Egypt when the Mamluk Sultanate passed from Circassian control into the hands of Yusuf Nabi. Mehmed II planned to march on Aleppo and therefore sent orders to Pir Ahmed and Şehsuvar Bey to join the army.

Even so, when Mehmed II personally took command of the army, it was not yet clear against whom the campaign would be directed. There were even those who believed that the expedition would be carried out against the Aq Qoyunlu.

Nevertheless, as long as the Karaman issue remained unresolved, launching a campaign in the east would have been a serious imprudence. It is impossible that Mehmed II was unaware of this. Perhaps all these preparations were in fact intended for a march against Karaman. Yet, as was his custom, the Conqueror kept his intentions secret. When the Ottoman army arrived in Afyonkarahisar, no one understood Mehmed II's true objective. However, while he was in the city, the envoy sent to Pir Ahmed returned and reported that Pir Ahmed would not join the campaign. Upon hearing this, Mehmed II redirected the route of the expedition toward Konya.

Pir Ahmed had also secured the support of the Mamluk Sultanate. After forcibly capturing the mountain fortress of Gevale, the Sultan took Konya without encountering serious resistance. Unable to withstand the advance, Pir Ahmed withdrew from Konya and fled to Larende. The Sultan marched forward and arrived at Larende.

With 60,000 soldiers, Mehmed II reached Larende, where Kökezoğlu and Turgutoğlu, commanding 20,000 men, engaged him in mountain pass battles for seven days. On the eighth day, 17,000 Bulgar and Gülnar Varsak troops under Kasım Bey, together with 4,000 Silifke soldiers and 3,000 men of the Oğuzoğulları, joined the Karaman army. Thus, Pir Ahmed's forces reached a total of 44,000 men. After a prolonged battle, the field was covered with corpses; mountains and rocks were stained red with blood. The combined losses of both armies amounted to 9,400 soldiers. Four beylerbeys, seven sanjak-beys, and 200 müteferrikas fell on the battlefield. Never had the world witnessed such a clash. Pir Ahmed fled the battlefield, and Mehmed II entered the province of Larende, demolishing the palaces of the Karaman beys.

Mehmed II was enraged by Pir Ahmed's escape. He vented his anger on the captives, ordering all of them executed. He then dispatched Mahmud Pasha to eliminate the Turgutlu Turkmens in the Karaman region and to pursue Pir Ahmed. Mahmud Pasha captured the fleeing Turgutlu soldiers in the Bulgar Mountains, chained them, and sent them to Mehmed II. His forces pursued the Turgutlu troops deep into Mamluk territory.

To crush the Karaman resistance, Mehmed II appointed his son Mustafa as beylerbey of Konya. Mustafa's establishment in Konya signaled that the Karamanids had lost Konya and Larende forever. Although not the entirety of the Karaman principality, a substantial portion of it was thus incorporated into the Ottoman Empire.
