= İslâm Ansiklopedisi =

Turkish encyclopedia

The İslâm Ansiklopedisi (İA) (transl. Encyclopedia of Islam) is a Turkish academic encyclopedia for Islamic studies published by Presidency of Religious Affairs. Other than Islamic learning, the encyclopedia is a valuable resource for the history of the Balkans and the Middle East during the Ottoman era.

== History ==
The decision to begin the encyclopedia project was made at the 1st Turkish Publications Congress in Ankara on 2–5 May 1939. In response to this Congress, the Turkish Minister of National Education Hasan Âli Yücel sent a letter dated 9 May 1939 to the rector of Istanbul University requesting that the Encyclopaedia of Islam be translated into Turkish.

The project was initially led by Ahmet Hamit Ongunsu, Dean of the Faculty of Letters of Istanbul University, but soon Abdülhak Adnan Adıvar was appointed leader of the project. The first fascicle of the Encyclopedia of Islam was published in December 1940. The project's first headquarters was in the Institute of Turkology's building, later used as the Istanbul University Professors' House. The headquarters was moved to Seyyid Hasan Pasha Madrasa in 1947. The encyclopedia was completed in 1987.

== Relationship with Encyclopaedia of Islam ==
Initially, in 1939, the İA was proposed to be a translation of the first Encyclopaedia of Islam (EI1, 1913–1938) into the Turkish language because the EI1 had only been introduced in English, French and German.

However, while preparing the İslâm Ansiklopedisi many articles of the EI1 were revised, expanded and corrected, and the work ultimately "had the dual purpose of amending Orientalist scholarship and elaborating on the Turkish contribution to Islamic tradition".

The result was that the İslâm Ansiklopedisi became a work consisting of 15 volumes instead of the originally proposed five. Some articles of the İA have been in turn included into the second Encyclopaedia of Islam (EI2, 1960–2007), and EI2 articles refer to many articles of the İA.

== Editors ==
From 1966 until 1987, the editor-in-chief of İslâm Ansiklopedisi was the Tahsin Yazıcı, a Turkish scholar of Persian literature, who personally contributed more than 150 articles to the work. The previous editor-in-chief was Ahmed Ateş.

== De facto standard for Ottoman Turkish transliteration ==
The transliteration system of the İslâm Ansiklopedisi has become a de facto standard in Oriental studies for the transliteration of Ottoman Turkish texts. For phonetic transcription the dictionaries of New Redhouse, Karl Steuerwald and Ferit Develioğlu have become standard. Another transliteration system is that of the Deutsche Morgenländische Gesellschaft (DMG), which handles any Turkic language written in the Arabic script. There are few differences between the İA and the DMG transliteration systems.

İA-Transliteration
ا	ب	پ	ت	ث	ج	چ	ح	خ	د	ذ	ر	ز	ژ	س	ش	ص	ض	ط	ظ	ع	غ	ف	ق	ك	گ	ڭ	ل	م	ن	و	ه	ى
ʾ / ā	b	p	t	s	c	ç	ḥ	ḫ	d	ẕ	r	z	j	s	ş	ṣ	ż	ṭ	ẓ	ʿ	ġ	f	ḳ	k,g,ñ,ğ	g	ñ	l	m	n	v	h	y

== Volumes ==
Volume	First article	Last article	Publication date
1	Ab	Atatürk	
2	ʿAtbara	Büzürgümmîd	
3	Cabala	Dvin	
4	Eb	Gwalior	
5 / 1	Hâ	Hüzeyl	
5 / 2	Inal	İzzüddevle	
6	Kâʾân	Kvatta	
7	Labbay	Mesânî	
8	Mescid	Mzâb	
9	Nabaʾ	Rüzzîk	
10	Sâ	Sufrûy	
11	Sugd	Tarika	
12 / 1	Tarîkat	Tuğrâ	
12 / 2	Tuğ	Türsiz	
13	Ubayd Allâh	Züsserâ	

== See also ==
- TDV Encyclopedia of Islam
- Encyclopaedia of Islam
- Encyclopædia Iranica
