= Tahsin Yazıcı (scholar) =

Turkish scholar of Persian and Arabic literature

- Born: 1922; Hoğas, Kiğı, Bingöl
- Died: 20 November 2002 (aged 79–80); Istanbul
- Known for: Literary scholarship

Academic background
- Education: University of Istanbul

Academic work
- Notable works: Critical edition of Aflākī's Manāqib al-ʿārifīn; İslâm Ansiklopedisi

Tahsin Yazıcı (1922 – 20 November 2002) was a Turkish literary scholar who was active in the latter half of the 20th century, when he produced his critical edition of Aflākī's Manāqib al-ʿārifīn, a hagiography of the Mevlevi Order, and other works focused on Persian mystic literature. He was also chief editor of the Turkish İslâm Ansiklopedisi for more than two decades.

Yazıcı has been described as an "eminent scholar of Persian and Arabic literatures", and his editions and translations of Mevlevi texts have been called "indispensable".

== Early life and studies ==
Yazıcı was born in Hoğas, a village near the town of Kiğı in Bingöl province, into a family of Turkish origin appointed to a position of authority by the Ottoman state.

He matriculated in 1940 at the University of Istanbul and graduated in Arabic and Persian language and literature in 1945, before being hired as a research assistant the following year by the Department of Classic Oriental Languages in the Faculty of Language.

In 1948, he wrote a dissertation on a Turkish Sufi named Ebrahim Golsani for which he received a doctorate in 1949, and in 1952 he was appointed as an assistant professor of Arabic and Persian Language and Literature in the Faculty of Literature.

His academic career was interrupted in 1956–57 when he was drafted into the Turkish army. During this period, he also married and had three children.

== Academic career ==
In 1955, shortly before his conscription, Yazıcı wrote his work Abdullah-i Ansari and his works (Turkish: Abdullâh-ı Ensârî ve eserleri). He published his two-volume critical edition of Manāqib al-ʿārifīn by Šams-al-Din Aḥmad Aflāki between 1959 and 1961.

When, in 1963, the Department of Arabic and Persian language and literature in the University of Istanbul's Faculty of Literature was split in two, he was made director of Persian language and literature.

In 1970, he then became Dean of the Faculty of Literature, and in 1981, when the university created the Department of Oriental Languages and Literatures, which included the Department for Arabic, Persian, Urdu, Hindology and Sinology, Yazıcı was appointed director.

From 1966 until 1987, Yazıcı was also the chief editor of and contributor of more than 150 articles to İslâm Ansiklopedisi, an Encyclopaedia of Islam published by the Religious Foundation of Turkey (Turkish: Türkiye Diyanet Vakfı). This work "had the dual purpose of amending Orientalist scholarship and elaborating on the Turkish contribution to Islamic tradition". He served as the consulting editor on Perso-Turkish history and literature for the Encyclopaedia Iranica.
