= Siege of Kastritza =

- Part of the Ottoman conquest of the Morea
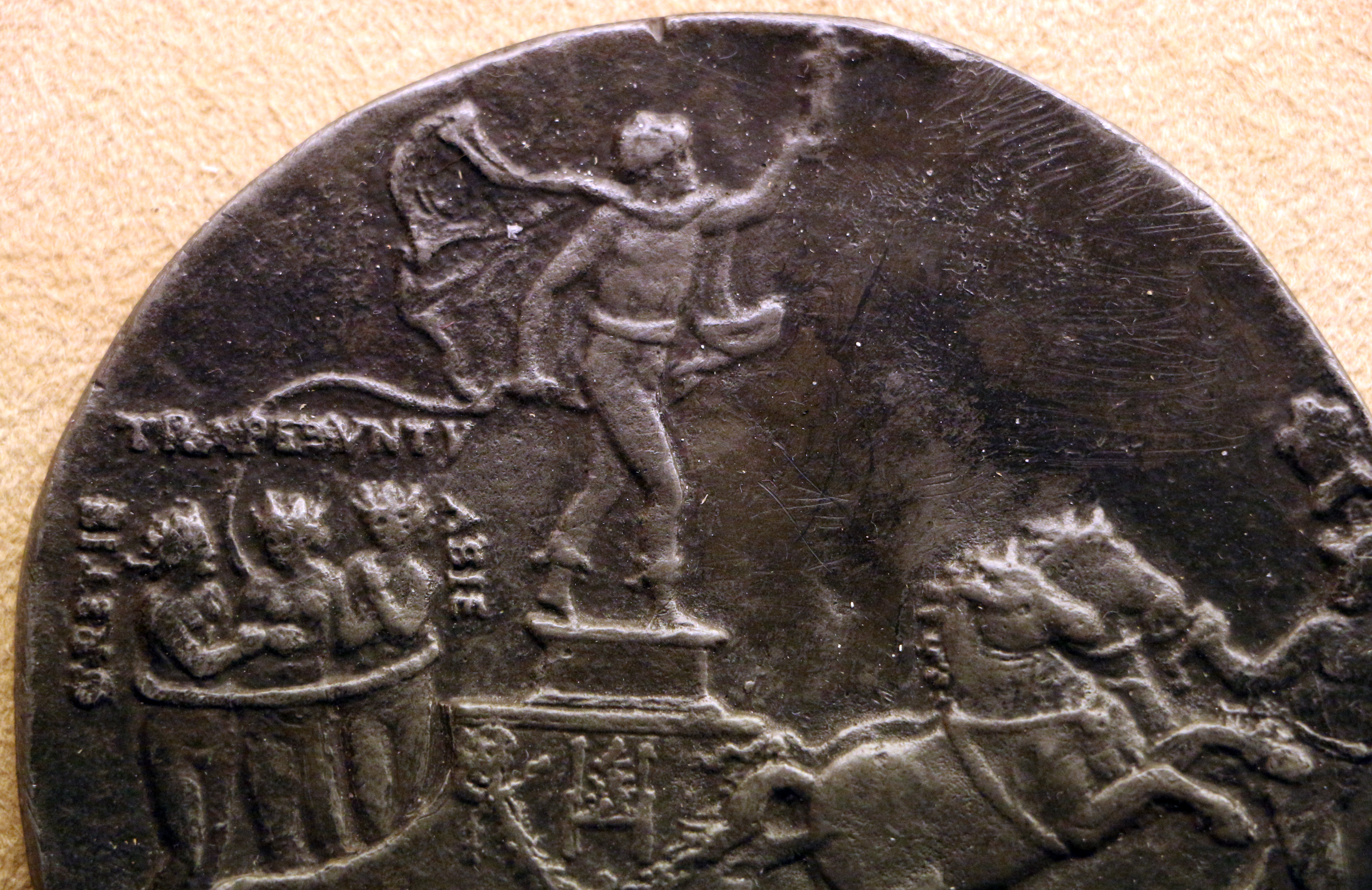
- A medallion of Mehmed II made by Bertoldo di Giovanni. The victorious figure on the chariot is Mehmed II. The three nude women in the background represent the regions under his rule (Asia, Trebizond, and Greece).
Date	1460
Location	Kastritza, Arcadia, Morea, Greece
Result	Ottoman victory

Belligerents
Ottoman Empire	Byzantine Empire; Duchy of Milan; Republic of Venice; Papal States

Commanders and leaders
Mehmed the Conqueror; Mahmud Angelović	Proinokokkas (executed)

Strength
Unknown	400 guardian

Casualties and losses
Unknown	100 killed 300 executed.

The Siege of Kastritza was the most intense battle during Mehmed II's second Morea campaign in 1460. Because the city was destroyed by Mehmed II, its exact location is unknown today. However, it is believed to be a fortress in the Arcadia region.

== Instability in Morea ==
After the first invasion during the 1458 campaign, Despot Thomas entered into a civil war with his brother. While Despot Demetrios supported the Turkish side, Despot Thomas heeded the Pope’s call for a crusade and received auxiliary forces from the Papacy and Milan.

With these forces, Thomas fomented unrest in the Morea and launched attacks against numerous fortresses as well as against his brother. Mehmed initially dispatched troops to the Morea under the command of Zagan Pasha, but since full control could not be established, Mehmed personally set out at the head of an army composed of infantry and cavalry.

== Siege ==
After bringing Demetrios under his control, Mehmed II launched a campaign against the territory held by Thomas. Mehmed entered the region of Arcadia, which was prosperous, fertile, and secured by strong fortresses, whose garrison commanders were receiving continuous support from Venice.

The garrison had lost 100 soldiers during the fighting; Mehmed ordered the execution of the remaining 300 defenders and had their commander, Proinokokkas, sawn in half.
