= Bayezid II Hamam =

Historic monument in Istanbul, Turkey

Coordinates: 41°0′35.8″N 28°57′41.4″E

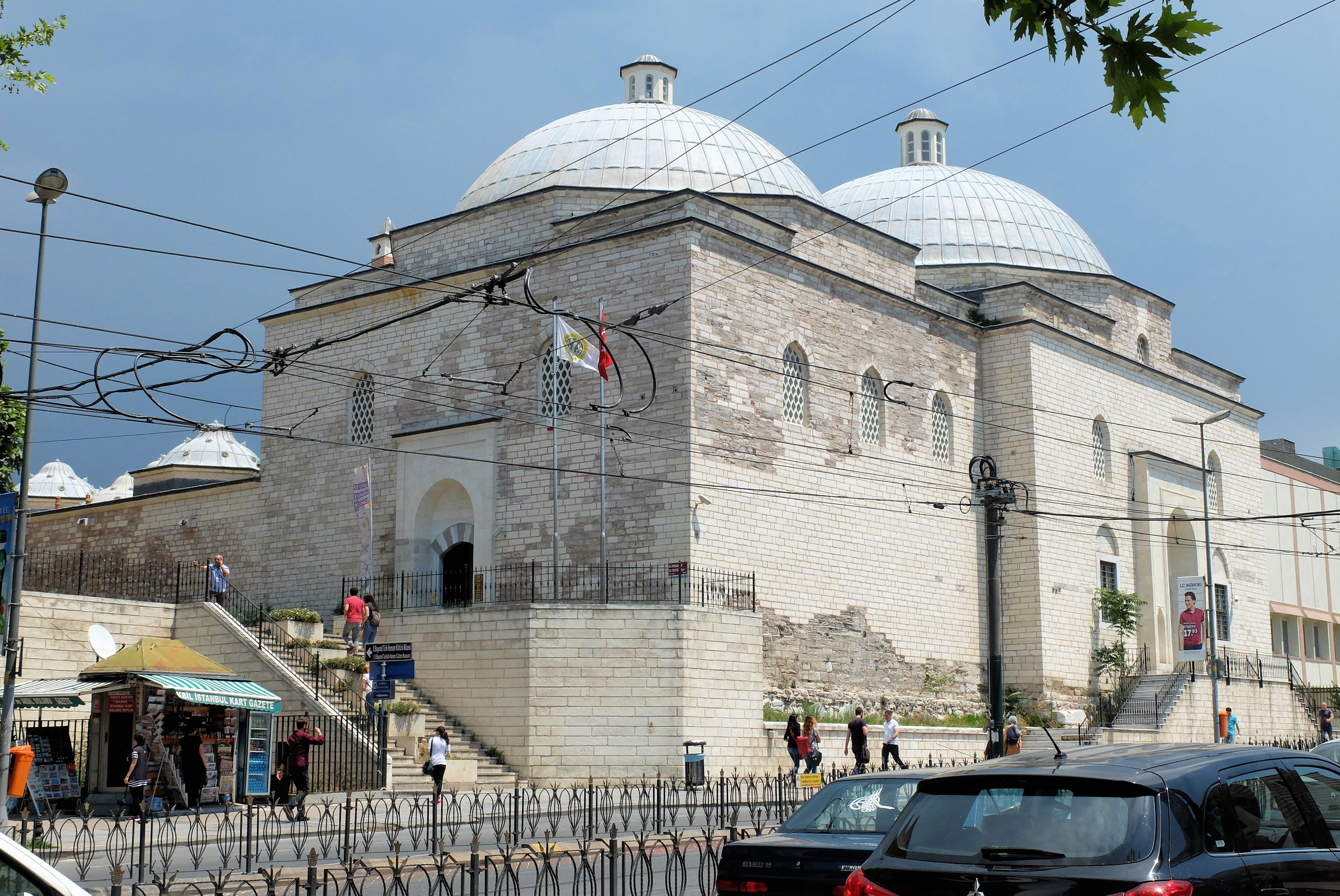
Bayezid II Hamam seen from Divanyolu in 2016 after restoration.

The Bayezid II Hamam (Turkish: Beyazıt Hamamı) is a historic bathhouse (hamam) on Divanyolu Street in Istanbul, Turkey. It was historically part of the külliye (religious and charitable complex) of the nearby Bayezid II Mosque and was one of largest hamams in the city.

== History ==
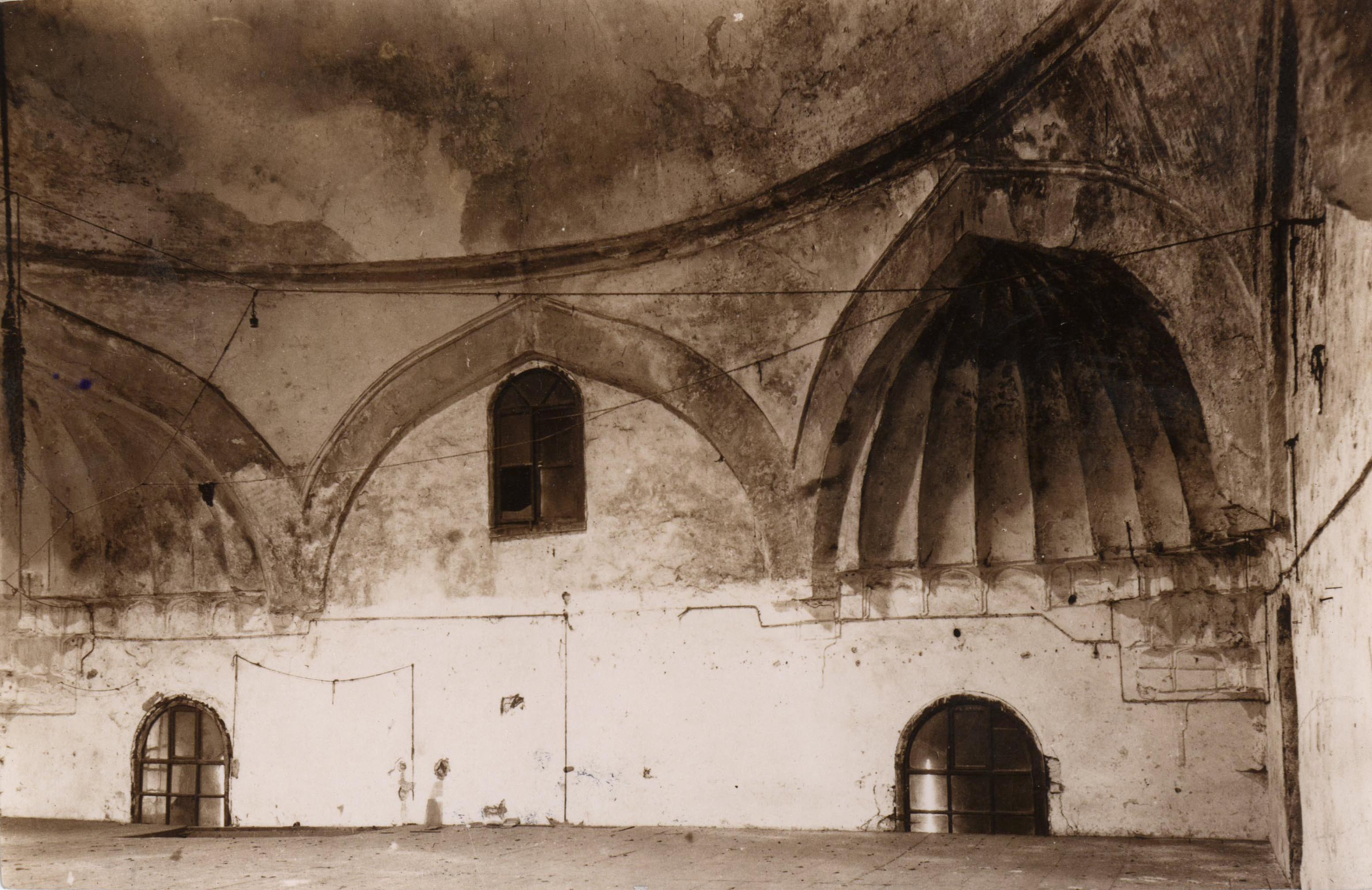
Interior of the camekan of the hamam (old photograph)

The Bayezid II Mosque and külliye is one of the oldest examples of an imperial mosque complex in Istanbul (preceded only by the Fatih Mosque complex). It was constructed between 1500 and 1505 and the complex included an imaret (public kitchen), a caravanserai, several mausoleums (türbes) and a medrese (madrasa), completed in 1507. The architect's name has not been firmly established although Yakubşah ibn Islamşah is the most likely chief architect, the other likely candidate being Hayreddin; at least one of Yakubşah's assistants helped finish off the medrese. The Bayezid Hamam is mentioned in historical documents of 1507, meaning it must have been completed before that date. Soon after construction the hamam was donated to a vakfiye (waqf) for another külliye commissioned by Gülbahar Hatun, Bayezid's wife and the mother of Selim I. (Though there is some confusion on this point, with some sources saying that Gülbahar commissioned the hamam herself and donated it to Bayezid II's complex.) Fragments of the ancient triumphal column from the Forum of Theodosius that once stood nearby were built into the hamam's foundation.

The baths were renovated following a fire in 1714 but by the end of the 20th century they were in a state of disrepair. In 2000 the hamam was expropriated and transferred to the ownership of Istanbul University. It then underwent a long restoration process starting in 2003 and continuing until 2010. In 2013 the building's conversion into a museum began, and in May 2015 it reopened as the Turkish Hamam Culture Museum (Türk Hamam Kültürü Müzesi), with exhibition halls and exhibits focusing on the historical culture surrounding the hamams of Istanbul. It is also possible to view the remains of a couple of Byzantine churches that were uncovered during the restoration process.

=== The Patrona Halil uprising ===
They are popularly associated with Patrona Halil, the Albanian leader of an uprising that deposed Ahmed III in 1730, who is said to have been employed as an hamam attendant (tellak) here. The uprising, motivated by economic grievances, resulted in Mahmud I coming to the throne. In the aftermath Patrona was executed along with thousands of his supporters, and bathhouses became places that governments viewed with suspicion. In 1734-35 an imperial decree ruled that all bathhouse workers needed to be registered, and measures discriminating against Albanian workers were introduced; those who left Istanbul to visit their hometown were barred from returning to work in the bathhouses, and new workers had to be from either Istanbul or Anatolia, in an effort to push remaining Albanians out of the workers' guild. Although the intended effect was slow to take hold, in the long term it resulted in a greater number of Istanbul bathhouse workers coming from Anatolia, especially from Sivas and Tokat, something that remains true today.

== Architecture ==
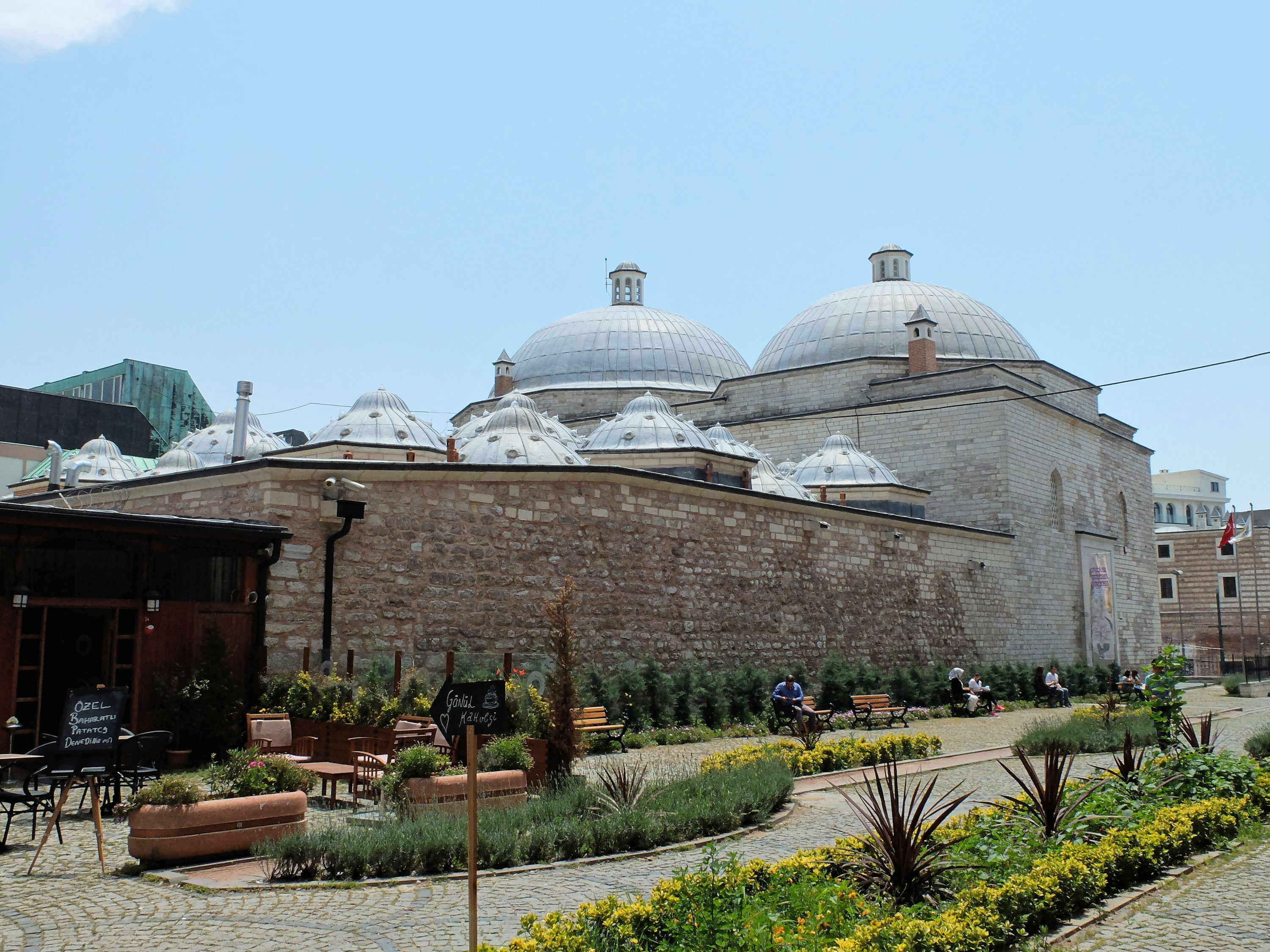
Domes of the hamam in 2016.

The hamam is one of the largest in the city and is considered a good example of hamam design in the era of classical Ottoman architecture. Its monumental appearance from the outside and its tall entrance portal earned it the name Hamam-ı Kebir ('Grand Bathhouse'). It is a double hamam, meaning that there are separate facilities for women and men. Each side consisted of an enormous domed chamber, the camekân (undressing room; also referred to as the cold room or soğukluk), an ılıklık (warm room or intermediate room) and a hararet (hot room). The women's camekân is slightly smaller than the men's. The dome of the men's camekân has a diameter of 15 meters. The warm room consists of a three-winged room with a central dome and three other domes arranged at right angles around it, with two other rooms in the corners between them. The hot room has a similar layout but with four instead of three wings, arranged in a cross, each with a dome, and with another domed room in each corner. The camekan's domes have grooved squinches, the warm room's domes have muqarnas squinches, and the hot room's domes have pendentives with arabesque-like carvings. The interior featured carved stucco decoration similar to earlier examples in Edirne, with some of the original decoration remaining in the corners of the domes.

== See also ==
- Tahtakale Hamam
- Mahmut Pasha Hamam
- Çemberlitaş Hamamı
