= Tahtakale Hamam =

Historic monument in Istanbul, Turkey

- Tahtakale Hamamı
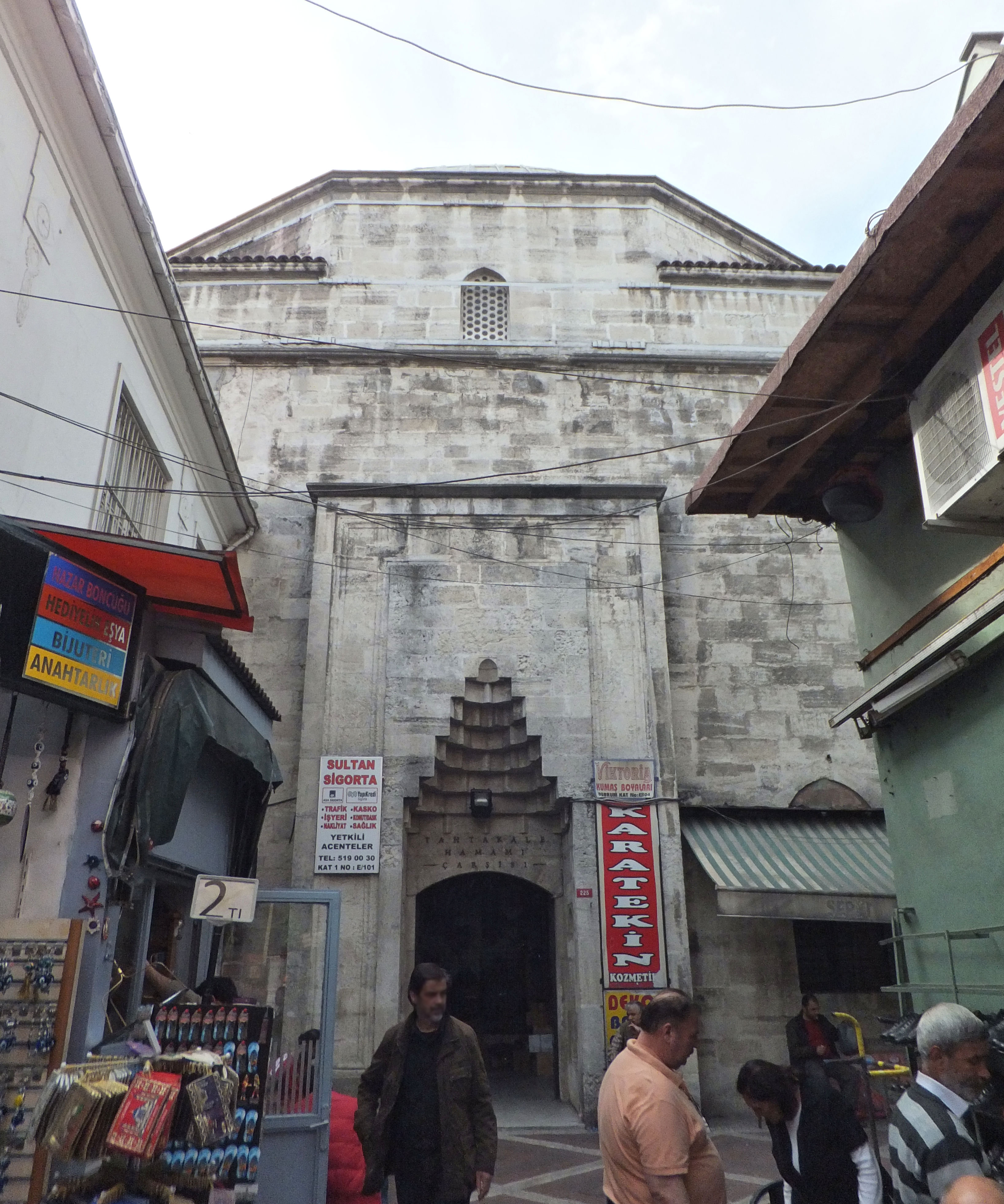
- The main entrance of the Tahtakale Hamam today
- Interactive map of the Tahtakale Hamam area
- Alternative names: Tahtakale Hamamı Çarşısı (Tahtakale Bath Bazaar)

General information
- Type: Hamam (bathhouse)
- Architectural style: Ottoman
- Location: Istanbul, Turkey, Uzun Çarşı Cd. 329/2, Sarıdemir, 34134 Fatih/İstanbul
- Coordinates: 41°01′3.7″N 28°58′4.8″E
- Completed: between 1454 and 1471
- Renovated: 1988–1992

The Tahtakale Hamam (English: Tahtakale Baths) is a historic Ottoman hammam (public bathhouse; Turkish: hamam) in Istanbul, Turkey, close to the Rüstem Pasha Mosque in the Tahtakale neighbourhood, between the Grand Bazaar and Eminönü. Built during the reign of Sultan Mehmet II, it is one of the oldest surviving bathhouses in the city. After having suffered significant damage while being used as a storage depot in the 20th century, the building was restored in the late 1980s and now serves as a local shopping centre and cafe.

== History ==
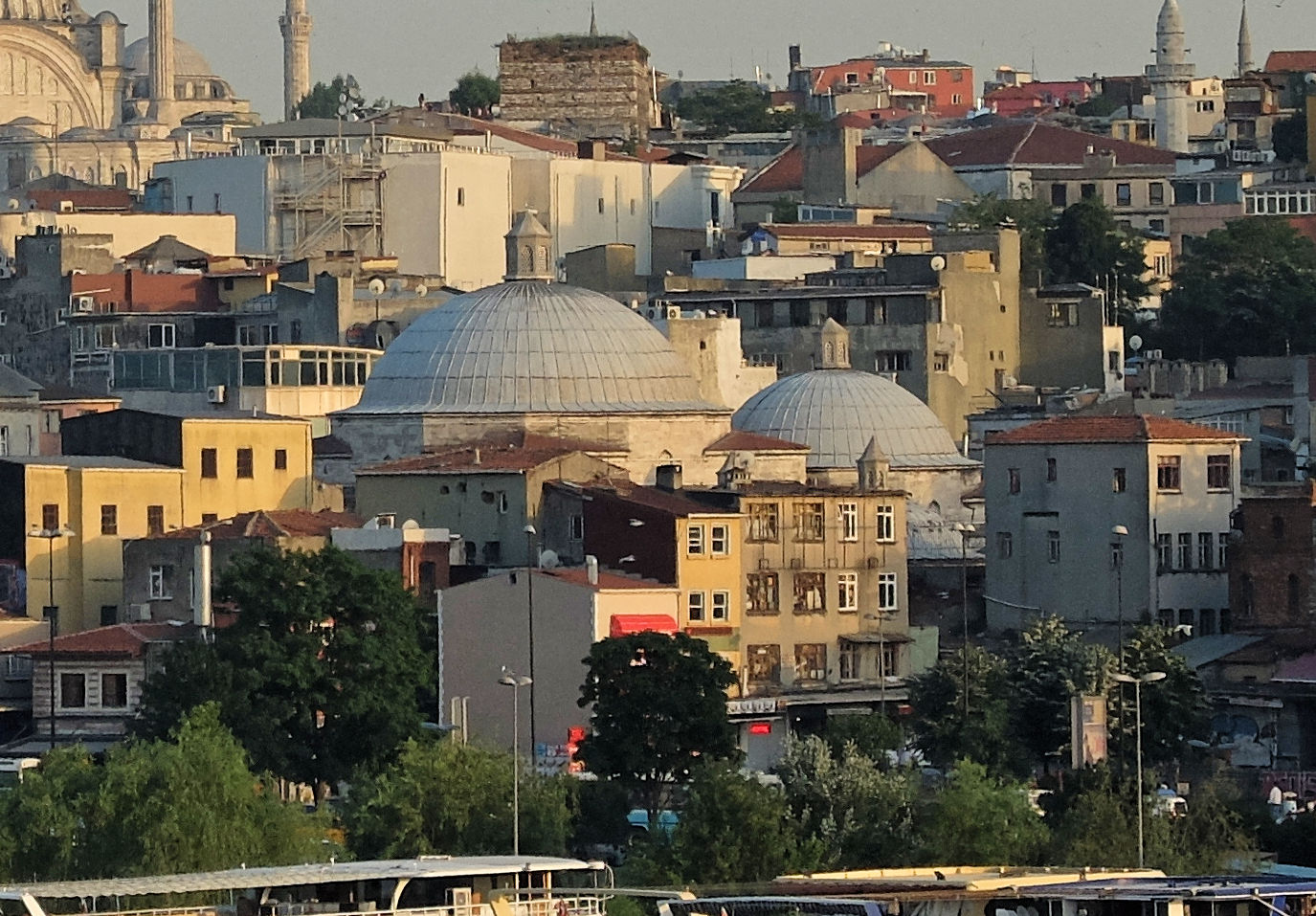
The two main domes of the hamam on the city's skyline (as seen from the Golden Horn side)

The hamam is mentioned in the waqf document of the Fatih Mosque in 1470–1471 (875 AH), indicating that it was built between 1453 (the Ottoman conquest of Constantinople) and 1471. Turkish scholar Doğan Kuban argues that the hamam was likely built at the same time as the Eski Saray (Old Palace), which Mehmet II built immediately after the conquest and which was located nearby in what is now the Beyazıt district. This would date the hamam to just after 1453 and would thus make it the oldest surviving hamam structure in the city. The only other documented hamams in the city which date from the time of Mehmet II are the Mahmut Pasha Hamam (part of the Mahmut Pasha Mosque's complex) built in 1466 and the Gedik Ahmet Pasha Hamam built around 1475.

The Tahtakale Hamam continued to serve as a bathhouse until possibly the early 1900s. It survived, but may have been damaged by, the 1894 earthquake as well as a major fire in the area in 1911. Afterwards the building was used as a deep freeze storage and cheese depot, which contributed to the deterioration of its historic fabric. A large section of the building's interior was destroyed and replaced with a modern structure with concrete floors, leaving only a part of the former men's baths and the cold room of the former women's baths still standing.

Eventually, the owner of the building decided to restore it and find another use for it. In 1988 (or 1989) a major restoration project began, lasting until 1992. The concrete structures were removed and the bathhouse's original floor plan was re-established. During the restoration, it was decided that the building would be converted into a commercial centre to ensure its economic viability. Since much of the building's original appearance could not be reconstructed without significant speculation, it was decided to use different restoration methods and principles for different parts of the building. Surviving elements were preserved while some details which had vanished were left unreconstructed, and new elements were added to enable the building's adaptation into a commercial centre with multiple shops. The former changing room of the men's baths, under the largest dome, became the main entrance and was outfitted with new galleries and a central fountain in homage to the original layout. Likewise, a new monumental entrance portal, in a simplified Ottoman style, was built in place of the original one which had disappeared without any visual documentation to facilitate its reconstruction. The building still serves as a local shopping centre, the Tahtakale Hamamı Çarşısı (Tahtakale Hamam Market), within the larger commercial district stretching north from the Grand Bazaar area.

== Architecture ==
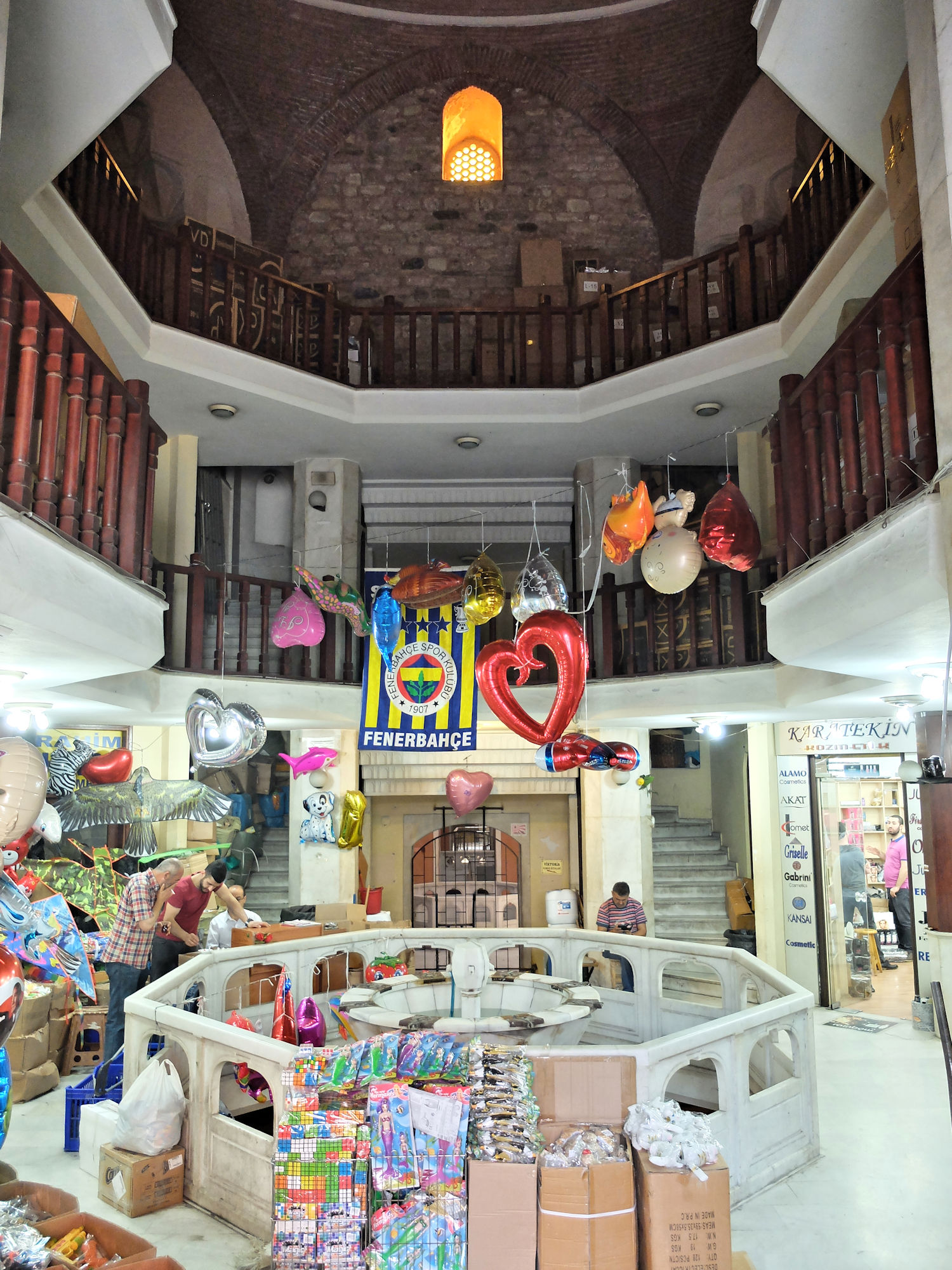
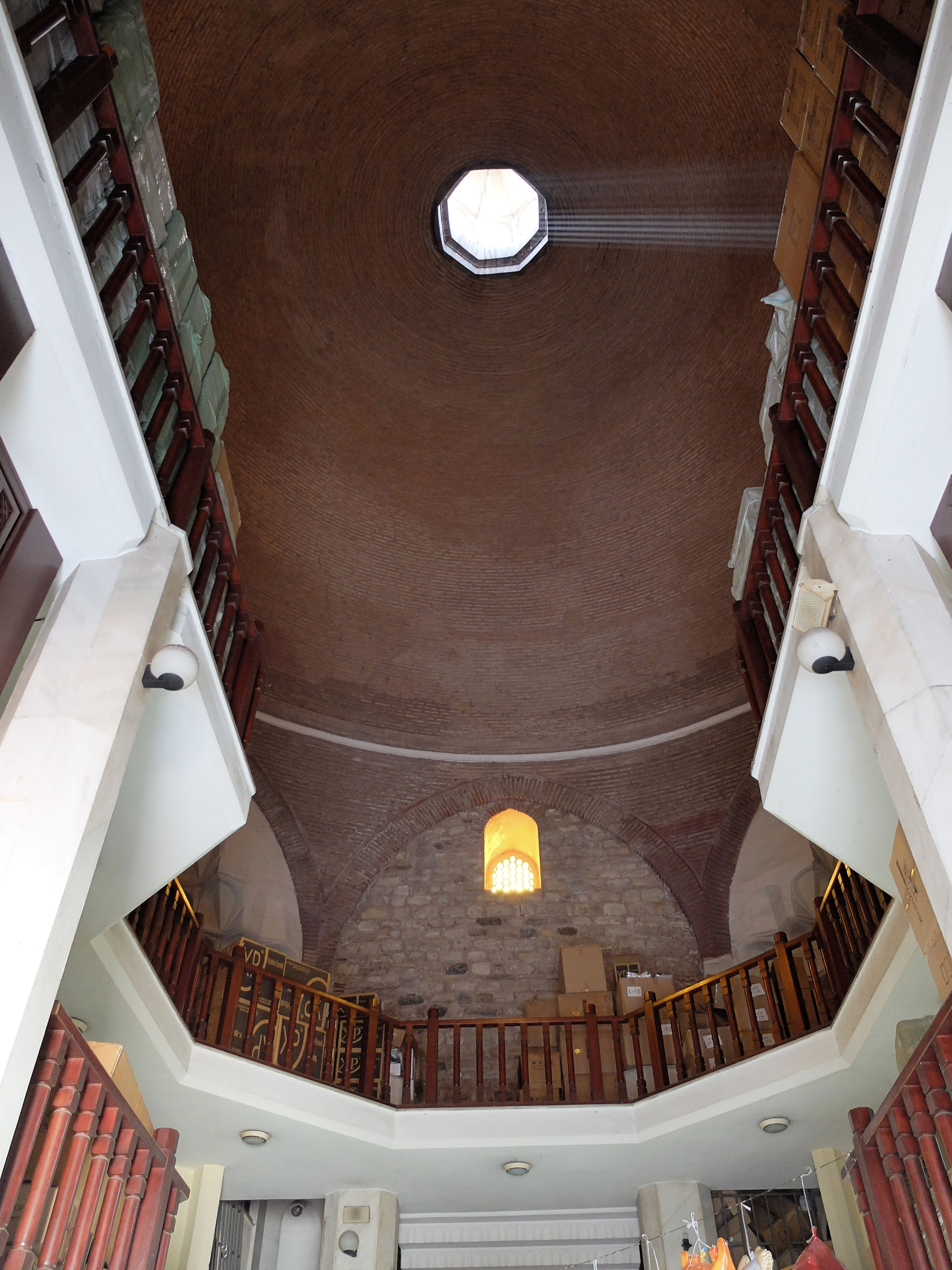
The large domed chamber that forms the hamam's main entrance today was formerly the men's changing room. The galleries and fountain date from the modern restoration but reflect the original layout of the building.

The building was a large double hamam with separate sections for men and women, each with their own sequence of changing room and steam rooms. The women's section, on the south side, was slightly smaller and narrower in plan than the men's section. It originally had its own entrance alongside the men's on the main street (to the east), but this entrance has not been preserved. The entrance to the men's section serves as the building's main entrance today, featuring a reconstructed portal with a tall monumental aspect and some muqarnas decoration. Another small entrance on the building's south side was added during its conversion into a shopping centre.

The rest of the building's floor plan has been preserved or reconstructed, with each section having a large changing room or cold room (equivalent to the apodyterium and frigidarium of Roman baths), followed by a warm room and then a hot room, with a service area for the furnaces at the back of the bathhouse now serving as a corridor to link the two sections. The hot rooms have fairly elaborate designs with multiple domed areas. The hot room of the men's section has a large central dome and is flanked by four smaller rooms on either side (almost all covered by their own domes). It also features four halvets (private areas reserved for special guests), giving this hamam one of the most advanced designs of its time.

The square-plan changing room of the men's section (now the main entrance) has the largest dome, measuring nearly 17 metres (56 ft) in diameter. The corners of the dome have muqarnas squinches, similar to those in the hamams of Edirne and Bursa built around the same period. While the original building was probably more extensively decorated, not much of this has survived and it could not be reconstituted during the restoration. The building's exterior is marked by a distinctive silhouette of domes with many pierced skylights and lanterns, visible from the surrounding roofs.

== See also ==
- Bayezid II Hamam
- Çemberlitaş Hamamı
