= Mahmut Pasha Hamam =

Historic monument in Istanbul, Turkey

Coordinates: 41°0′43.6″N 28°58′12.8″E

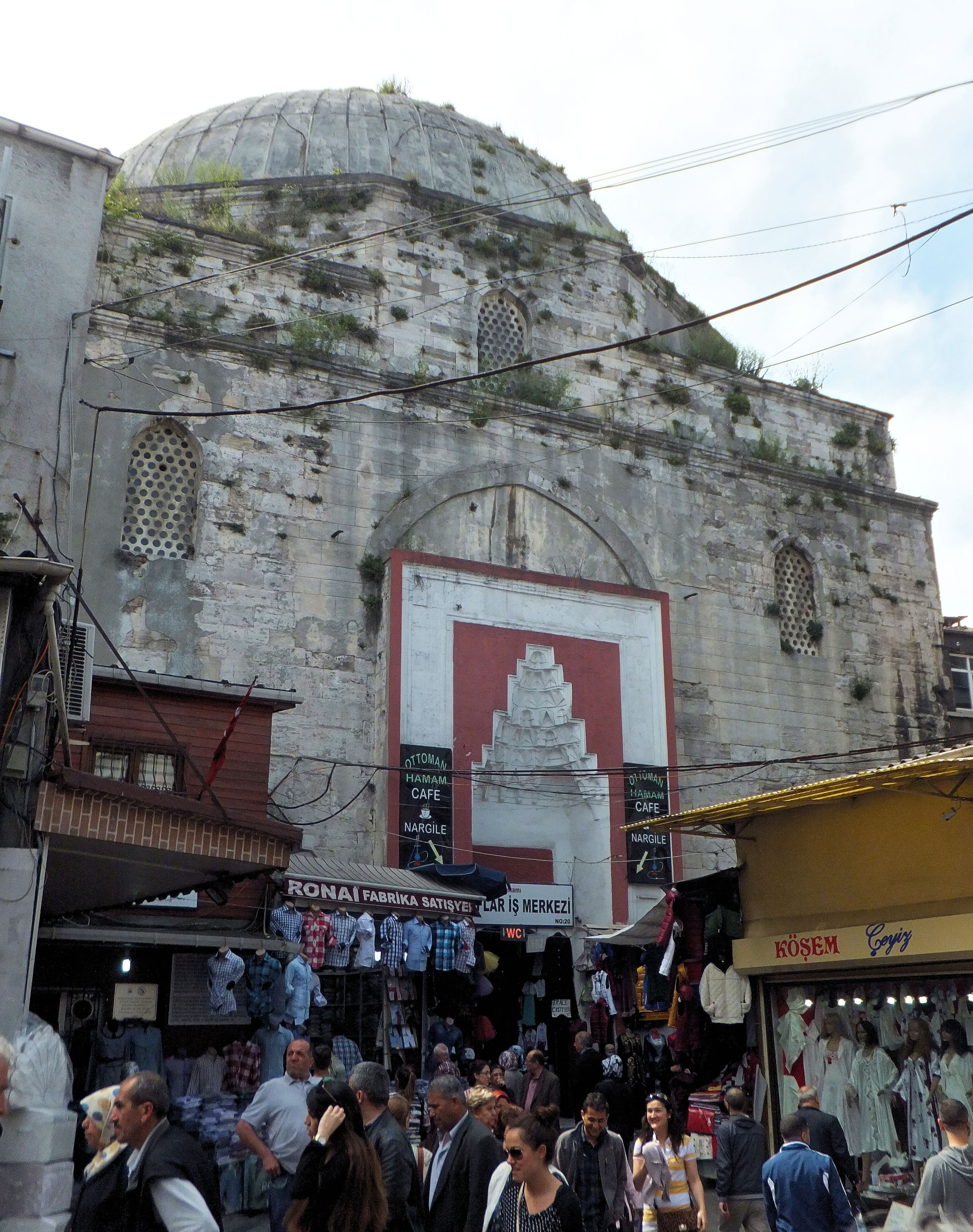
Exterior view of the hammam and its main entrance today

The Mahmut Pasha Hamam (Turkish: Mahmutpaşa Hamamı) is a historic Ottoman hamam (public bathhouse) in Istanbul, Turkey. Founded by Mahmud Pasha, the grand vizier of Mehmet II, it was completed in 1466 and is one of the oldest surviving bathhouse structures in the city. It was part of the complex of the Mahmud Pasha Mosque, located northeast of the Grand Bazaar. After suffering damage over time, it was restored in the 20th century and now serves as a local shopping centre.

== History ==
The hamam is part of a külliye, a religious and charitable complex that was founded by Mahmud Pasha, the grand vizier of Sultan Mehmet II Fatih "the Conqueror". The main part of the complex, the Mahmut Pasha Mosque, was completed in 1464 and is one of the earliest Ottoman architectural complexes in Istanbul. The waqf (endowment) of the mosque and its associated charitable buildings was quite extensive, covering a number of different buildings across the surrounding district, which suggests that Mehmet II may have entrusted Mahmud Pasha with developing this district near the commercial heart of the city, just east and north of the area which would become the Grand Bazaar.

The hamam of the complex, located northwest of the mosque, was completed in 1466 CE, making it the oldest hamam in the city after the Tahtakale Hamam, built slightly earlier. It was damaged by fire in 1755 and was restored in 1953. It served as a storage depot for some time but now houses a shopping centre.

== Architecture ==
The hamam's architecture and layout is very similar to that of the Tahtakale Hamam built by Mehmet II slightly earlier. It was originally a double bathhouse, meaning it had separate (but adjacent) facilities for men and for women, including changing rooms and steam rooms for each. However, the women's section was later demolished to make room for another commercial structure. The surviving building includes a large domed chamber at the entrance which was originally the men's changing room. This is followed by two more domed steam rooms: the tepid room and a hot room. The dome of the changing room, the largest in the Mahmut Pasha complex, is 17 meters in diameter and has muqarnas squinches at its corners. The dome of the warm room is richly carved and preceded by a ribbed or scallop-shaped half-dome, the earliest surviving example of a half-dome in Istanbul. The hot room is octagonal and covered by another dome, and has four iwans or niches in the walls which could be used for individual washing. At its centre was a large octagonal platform, the göbektaşı, where guests could lie down for massages. Three small domed rooms, used for private washing or services, were accessible on either side (to the north and south).

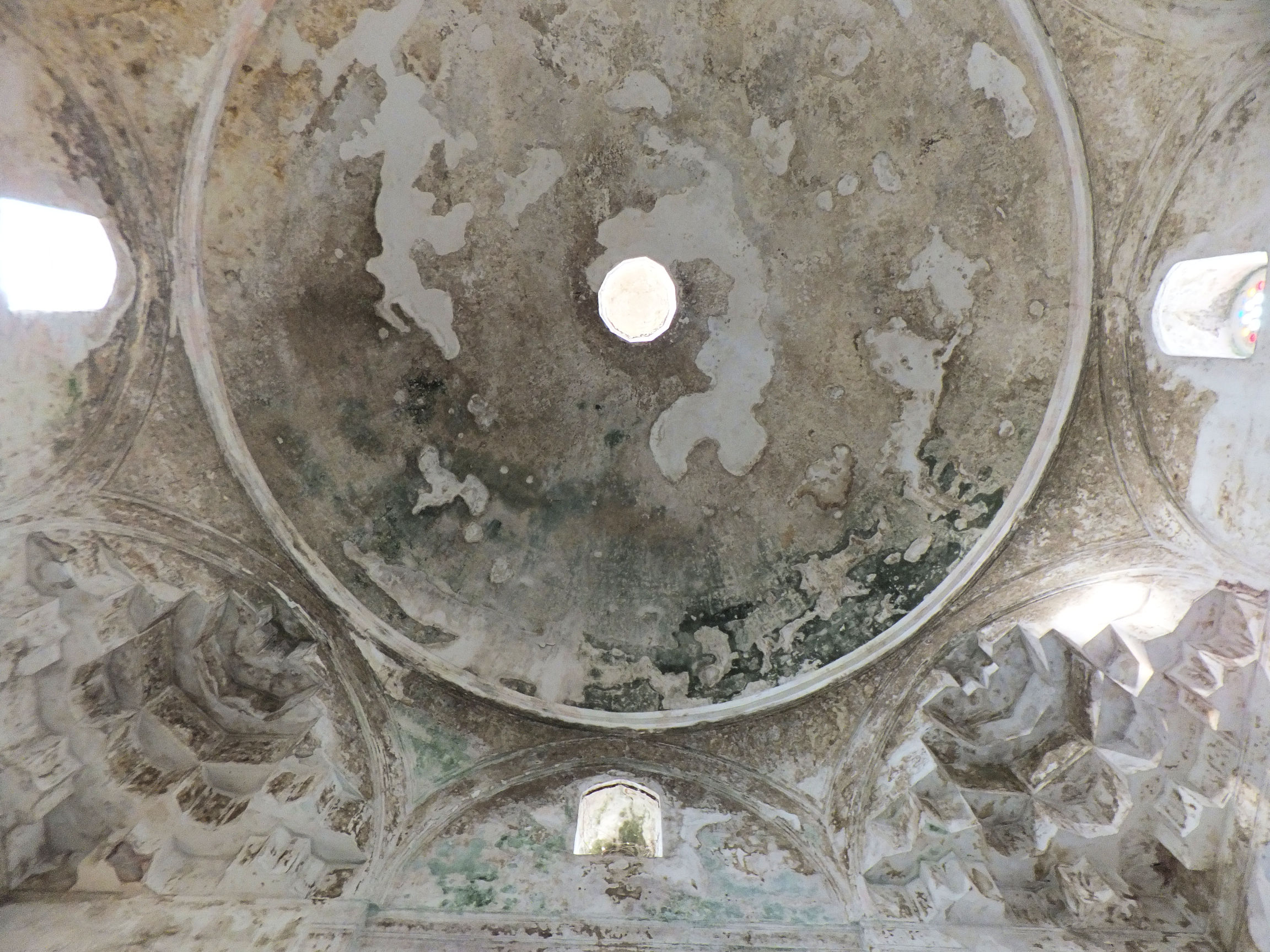
The dome of the changing room

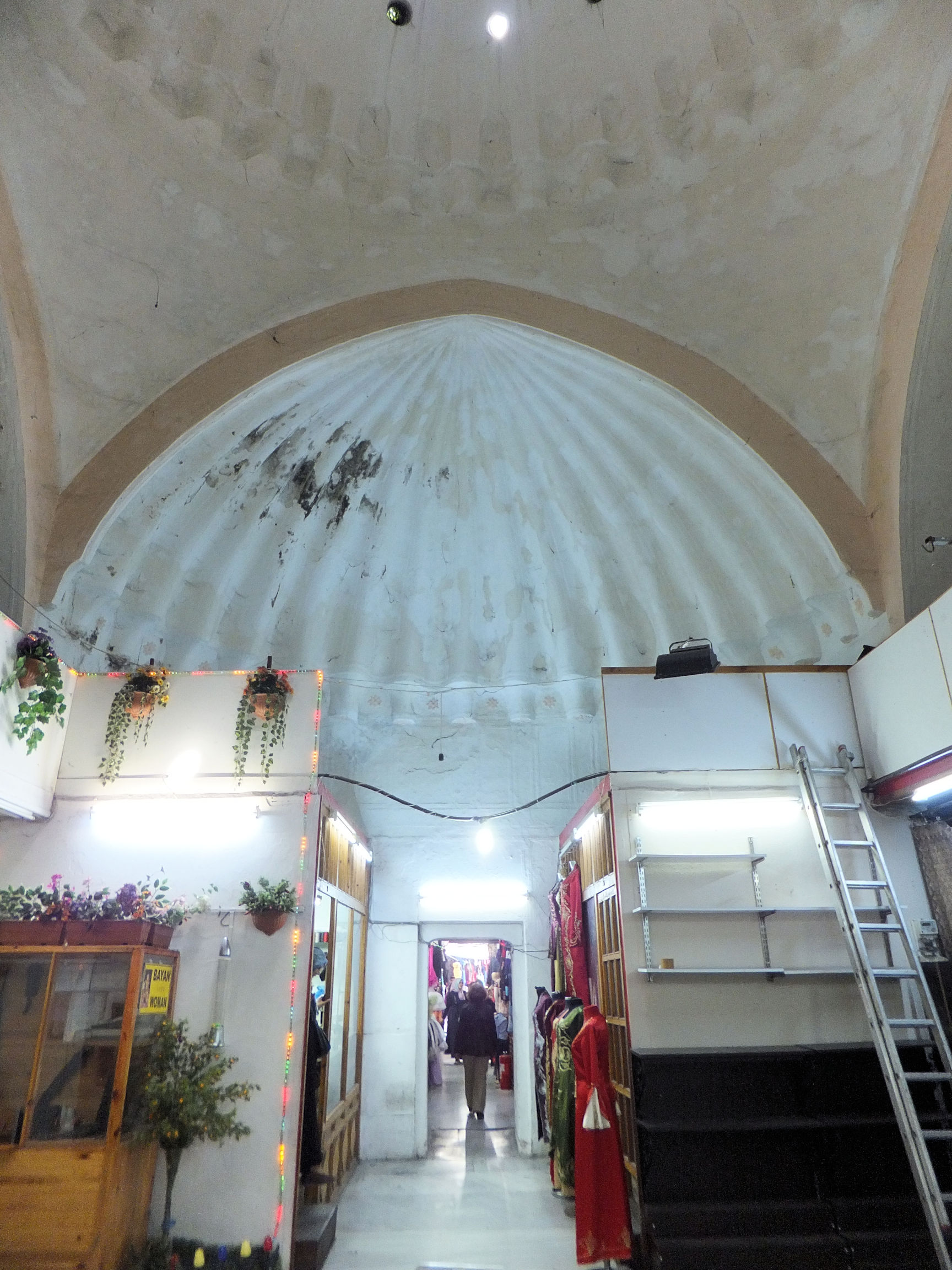
The half-dome of the warm room

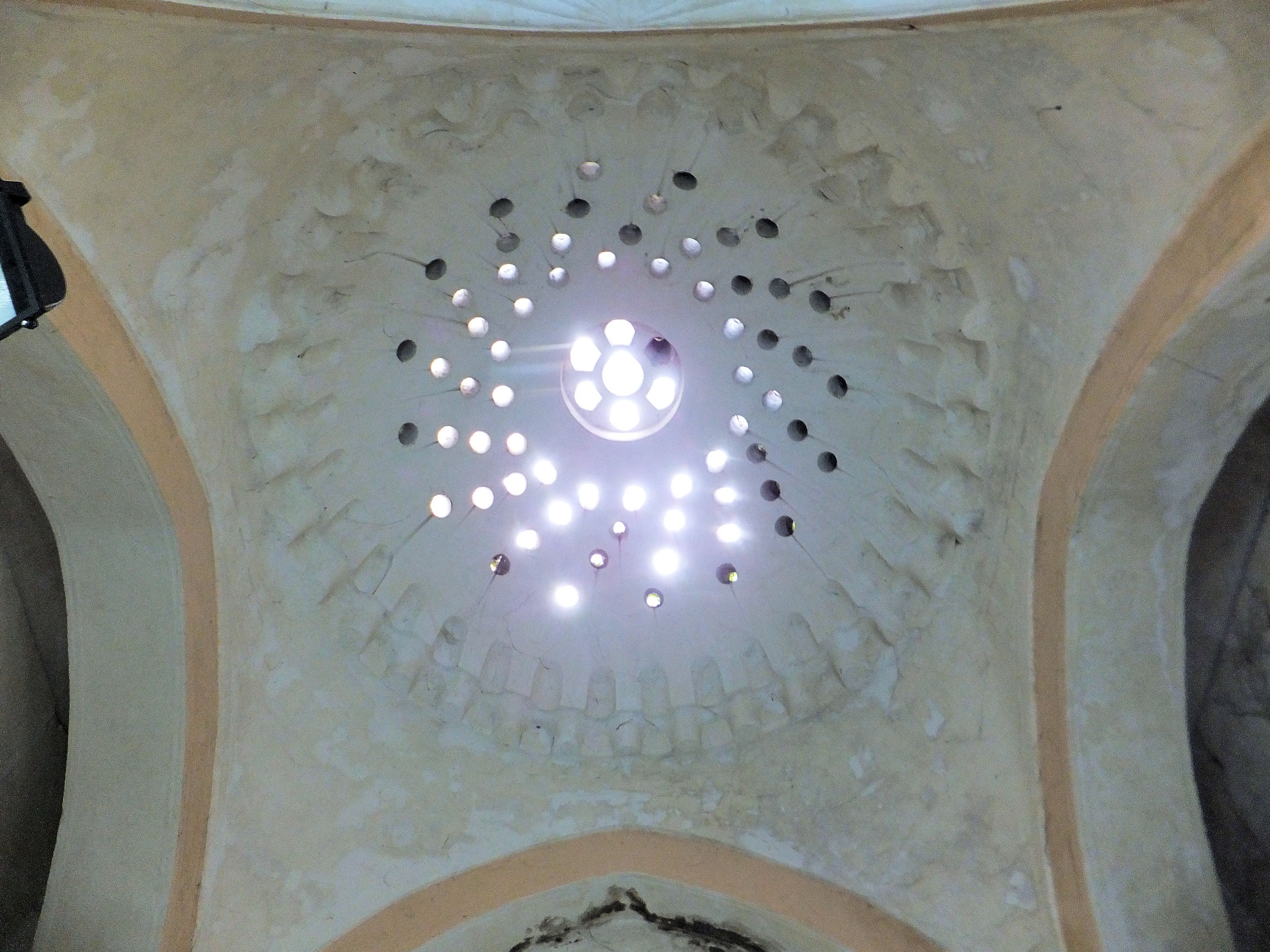
The main dome over the warm room
