= Mahmud Pasha Angelović =

Grand Vizier of the Ottoman Empire (1456–1466, 1472–1474)

Mahmud Angelović Pasha
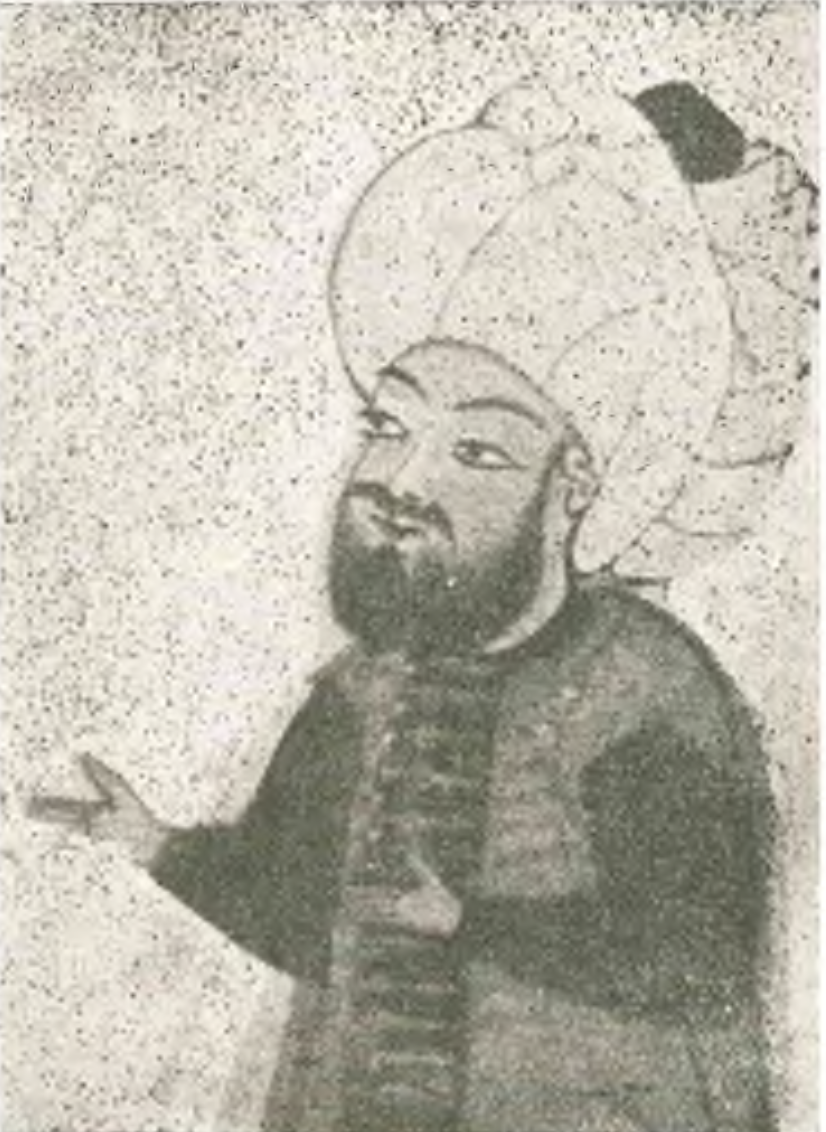

Grand Vizier of the Ottoman Empire
- In office 1472–1474
- Monarch: Mehmed II
- Preceded by: Ishak Pasha
- Succeeded by: Gedik Ahmed Pasha
- In office 1456–1466
- Monarch: Mehmed II
- Preceded by: Zaganos Pasha
- Succeeded by: Rum Mehmed Pasha

Personal details
- Born: 1420 Novo Brdo, Serbian Despotate (modern-day Kosovo)
- Died: 1474 (aged 53–54)
- Spouse: Selçuk Hatun
- Children: Ali Bey; Hatice Hatun
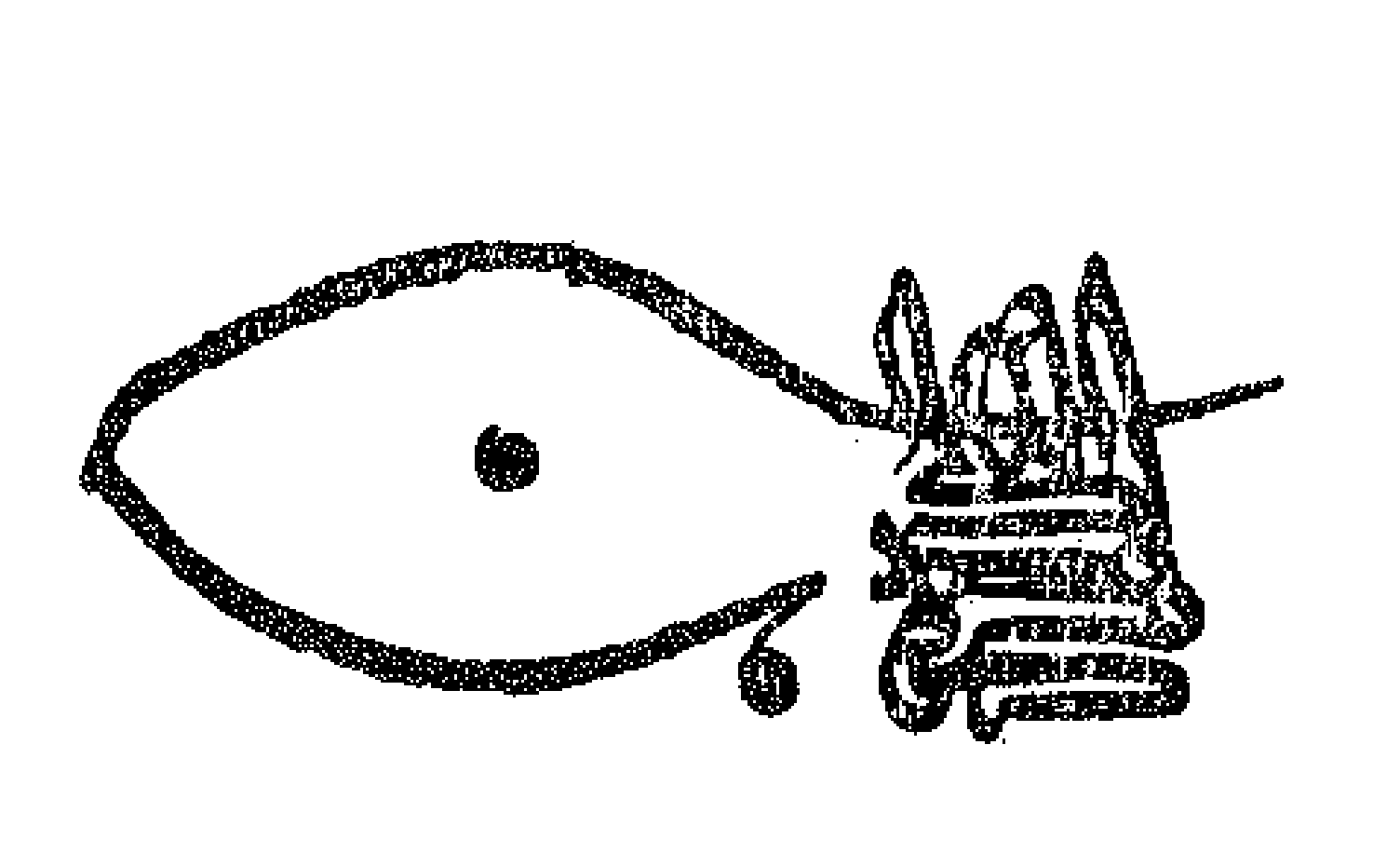
- Signature
- Nickname: Adni

Military service
- Allegiance: Ottoman Empire
- Branch/service: Ottoman Navy
- Rank: Kapudan Pasha (grand admiral)
- Battles/wars: Byzantine-Ottoman Wars; Fall of Constantinople; Siege of Kastritza; Siege of Gardiki-Arcadia; Siege of Salmeniko; Siege of Trebizond (1461); Hungarian-Ottoman Wars; Siege of Belgrade (1456); Battle of Tahtalu; Siege of Smederevo (1459); Ottoman wars in Europe; Aegan Expedition (1456); Battle of Buzău; Ottoman conquest of Lesbos; Ottoman wars in Asia; Siege of Amasra; Siege of Sinop (1461); Battle of Koyulhisar (1461); Ottoman-Venetian War (1463-1479); Siege of Bobovac; Battle of Kljuc (1463); Siege of Corinth (1463); Battle of Tenedos (1464); Siege of Mytilene (1464); Battle of Zvornik (1464); Albanian campaign of 1467; Battle of Larende; Siege of Negroponte (1470); Battle of Erzincan (1473); Battle of Otlukbeli

Mahmud Pasha Angelović (Serbian: Махмуд-паша Анђеловић/Mahmud-paša Anđelović; Turkish: Veli Mahmud Paşa; 1420–1474) was a major military leader and the grand vizier of the Ottoman Empire from 1456 to 1466 and from 1472 to 1474. He also wrote Persian and Turkish poems under the takhallus (pen name) Adni (the "Eden-like").

Born in the Serbian Despotate, he was a descendant of the Byzantine Angelos family that had left Thessaly in 1394. According to biographers, he was conscripted as a child by the Ottomans employing the devşirme system. Raised as a Muslim in Edirne, he was a capable soldier and was married to a daughter of Zaganos Pasha. After distinguishing himself at the Siege of Belgrade in 1456, he was raised to the position of grand vizier as a reward, succeeding his father-in-law Zaganos Pasha. Throughout his tenure, he led armies or accompanied Mehmed II on his own campaigns.

== Origin and early life ==
After the Ottoman conquest of Thessaly in 1394, the ruling Angeloi Philanthropenoi family took refuge. The grandchildren of either Alexios or Manuel were Mahmud Pasha and his brother Mihailo Anđelović.

It is estimated that Angelović was born in the early 1420s. Most historians accept that Angelović was born in Novo Brdo in the Serbian Despotate, and that his father Mihailos was the son of either Alexios Angelos Philanthropenos or his son/nephew/brother Manuel, rulers of Thessaly. T. Stavrides views it more probable that Manuel was his grandfather. The only information on his father is that he lived in Serbia in the 1420s. His mother's ancestry is the matter of debate. Chalkokondyles (1430–1470) called her Serbian, Kritoboulos (1410–1470), Greek, while there are various theories on her noble ancestry. Angelović had a brother, Mihailo Anđelović, later a prominent Serbian statesman, after the Turkish conquest.

According to Tahsin Yazıcı, Angelović was "born to a Greek or Serbian family". Dejan Djokić stated that Angelović was born "to a Serb mother and a Greek refugee father – no less than son of the last Angeloi ruler of Thessaly who had emigrated to Serbia in the late fourteenth century". Ottoman historians like Gelibolulu Mustafa Ali and later considered him as a Croat, and Angelović himself in a letter from April 1467 signed as "Abogović Hrvat" (but the Croatian ethnonym probably meant "someone from the wider south-Slavic area").

Chalkokondyles mentions that Angelović was captured by Ottoman horsemen while travelling with his mother from Novo Brdo to Smederevo (the Serbian capital), and taken to the Ottoman court. It is assumed that this took place in 1427, when the Ottomans attacked Serbia. Furthermore, it is unconcluded whether he was captured according to the devşirme (practice, the regular practice of taking children of certain noble families whose Ottomans have taken lands and making these children high rankings officials) or as a prisoner of war. Taşköprüzade (d. 1560) and Aşık Çelebi (1520–1572) name two other boys led with Angelović on horseback to Edirne, Molla Iyas and Mevlana Abdülkerim, the latter of whom reached the rank of kadıasker (chief judge) and şeyhülislam (Islamic scholar). Upon conversion to Islam, he received the name Mahmud.

Little is known about his activities before 1453. According to T. Stavrides, Angelović and his companions were educated in the palace, probably as içoğlan, and Mahmud then entered service in the Enderûn, later serving prince Mehmed, the future sultan. Sources do not agree on which posts he held at the palace.

== Life ==
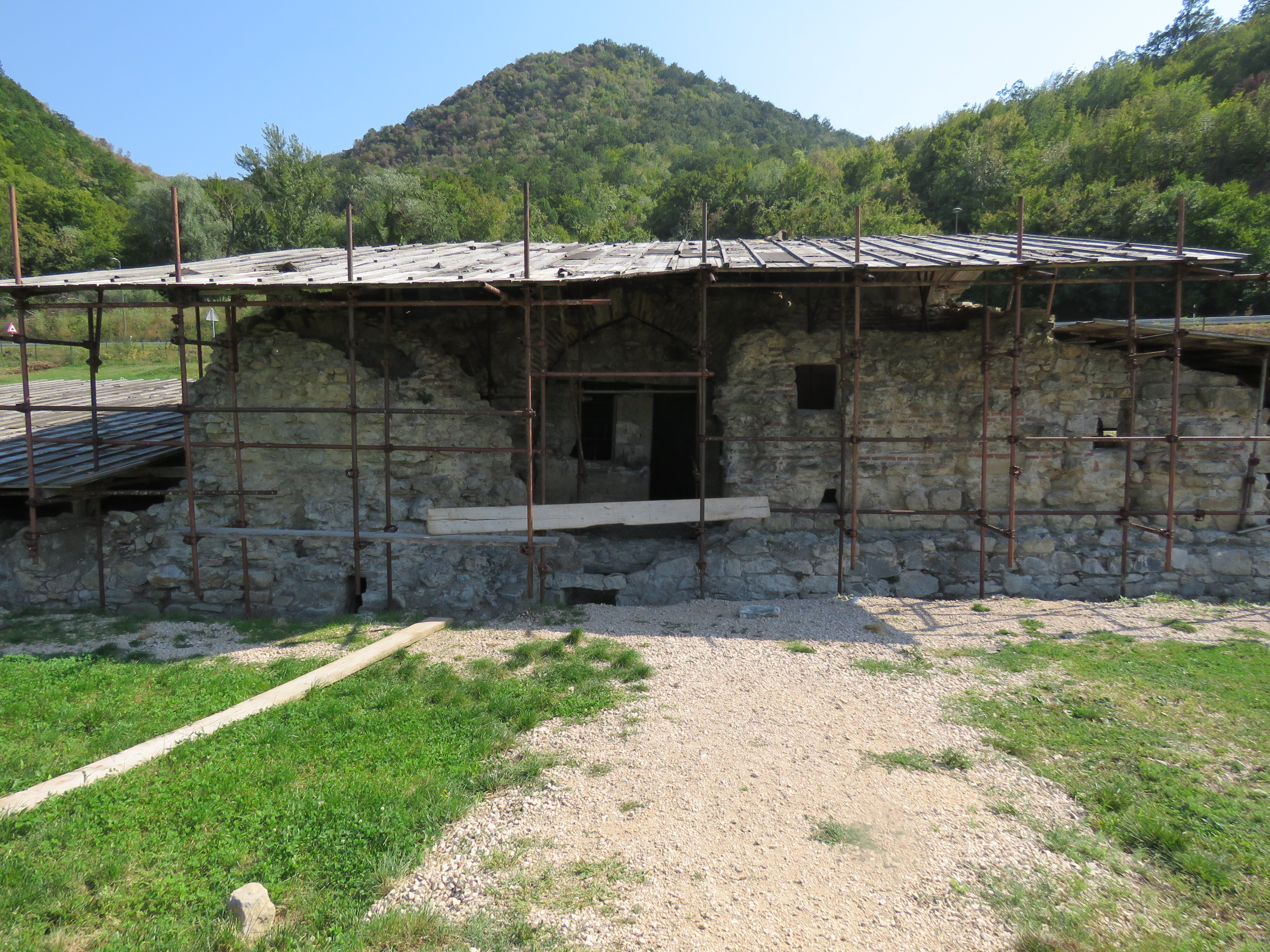
Remains of Mahmud Pasha hamam at Lower Town of Golubac Fortress.

Mahmud Pasha was a capable soldier. After distinguishing himself at the siege of Belgrade (1456), he was raised to the position of Grand Vizier as a reward, succeeding Zaganos Pasha. Throughout his tenure he led armies or accompanied Mehmed II on his own campaigns.

In 1458, the Serbian Despot Lazar Branković died. Mahmud's brother Mihailo became member of a collective regency, but he was soon deposed by the anti-Ottoman and pro-Hungarian faction in the Serbian court. In reaction, Mahmud attacked and seized Smederevo Fortress, although the citadel held out, and seized some additional strongholds in its vicinity. Threatened by a possible Hungarian intervention however he was forced to withdraw south and join the forces of Sultan Mehmed II at Skopje. In 1461, he accompanied Mehmed in his campaign against the Empire of Trebizond, the last surviving fragment of the Byzantine Empire. Mahmud negotiated the surrender of the city of Trebizond with the protovestiarios, the scholar George Amiroutzes, who was also his cousin.

In 1463, Mahmud led the invasion and conquest of the Kingdom of Bosnia, even though a peace treaty between Bosnia and the Ottomans had just been renewed. He captured the Bosnian king, Stephen Tomašević, at Ključ, and obtained from him the cession of the country to the Empire.

Angelović accompanied Mehmed II when he attacked Albania Veneta in the summer of 1467, and ravaged the lands. For 15 days he pursued Skanderbeg, who was a Venetian ally at the time, but failed to find him, as Skanderbeg retreated into the mountains and then succeeded in fleeing to the coast. According to Tursun Beg and Ibn Kemal, Angelović swam over Bojana, attacked Venetian-controlled Scutari, and plundered the surrounding area.

Mahmud was dismissed in 1468 due to the machinations of his successor, Rum Mehmed Pasha, ostensibly due to irregularities regarding the resettlement of the Karamanids in Constantinople following the conquest of Karaman earlier in that year. He was reinstated in 1472, but his relations with the Sultan were now strained. Mahmud was fired and executed in 1474. The cause was the suspicion that he was involved in the sudden death of Şehzade Mustafa, the favorite son of Sultan Mehmed II. It was said that Şehzade Mustafa had an affair with Mahmud's wife, Selçuk Hatun (sister of Hatice Hatun, the youngest consort of Mehmed II), and that Mahmud poisoned him for it. Mahmud denied it but, even without proof, Mehmed II still decided to execute him.

== Literary output ==
Mahmud Pasha wrote works in Persian and Turkish with "Adni" as his pen name. The divan he composed includes 45 ghazals and 21 mofrads in Persian, as well as "some rather successful naziras on the ghazals of Zahir Faryabi and Hafez". Tahsin Yazıcı adds that Mahmud Pasha "also wrote a number of official letters in Persian".

== Family ==
Consorts

1. Selçuk Hatun –daughter of Zaganos Pasha by his first wife Sitti Nefise Hatun, and they had a son named Ali Bey and a daughter named Hatice Hatun.
2. Unnamed Hatun– His second wife was alleged to have had an affair with Şehzade Mustafa, son of Sultan Mehmed II. For this reason, Mahmud was suspected of involvement in Mustafa's death and executed.

== In popular culture ==
1. Mahmud pasha appears in the popular Netflix series Rise of Empires: Ottoman based on Mehmed the Conqueror in season 2. Nik Xhelilaj played the role of mahmud pasha. Season 2 shows the struggle with vlad dracula in wallachia.
2. Gürkan Uygun played the role of mahmud pasha in television series Mehmed: Fetihler Sultani.

== Sources ==
- Babinger, Franz (1992) [1978]. Mehmed the Conqueror and His Time. Bollingen Series 96. Translated from the German by Ralph Manheim. Edited, with a preface, by William C. Hickman. Princeton, New Jersey: Princeton University Press. ISBN 0-691-09900-6.
- Finkel, Caroline (2006). Osman's Dream: The Story of the Ottoman Empire 1300–1923. London: John Murray. ISBN 978-0-7195-6112-2.
- Stavrides, Théoharis (2001). The Sultan of Vezirs: The Life and Times of the Ottoman Grand Vezir Mahmud Pasha Angelovic (1453–1474). Brill. ISBN 978-90-04-12106-5.
- Mehmed: Fetihler Sultani https://www.imdb.com/title/tt38365910/characters/nm1699178/?ref_=tt_cst_c_3
- Rise of the empires: ottoman https://www.imdb.com/title/tt18305246/characters/nm2956046/
- Tekindağ, Şehabeddin (2003). "Mahmud Paşa" (PDF). İslâm Ansiklopedisi, Vol. 27 (Kütahya Mevlevihânesi – Manisa) (in Turkish). pp. 376–378.
- Yazici, T. (1983). "ʿADNĪ, MAḤMŪD PĀŠĀ". In Yarshater, Ehsan (ed.). Encyclopædia Iranica. Vol. I/5: Adat–Afghanistan. London and New York: Routledge & Kegan Paul. p. 470. ISBN 978-0-71009-094-2.

Political offices
Preceded by Zaganos Pasha	Grand Vizier of the Ottoman Empire; 1456–1466	Succeeded by Rum Mehmed Pasha
Preceded by Ishak Pasha	Grand Vizier of the Ottoman Empire; 1472–1474	Succeeded by Gedik Ahmed Pasha
