= Alexios Angelos Philanthropenos =

Alexios Angelos Philanthropenos (Greek: Ἁλέξιος Ἂγγελος Φιλανθρωπηνός) was a Byzantine Greek nobleman who ruled Thessaly from 1373 until c. 1390 (from c. 1382 as a Byzantine vassal) with the title of Caesar.

== Biography ==
The Angeloi of Thessaly rose to prominence during the reign of the Simeon Uroš ruler of Epirus and Thessaly (r. 1359–1370), as they were related to his wife. When Simeon died in 1370, he was succeeded by his son John Uroš (r. 1370–1373). John cared more for religious pursuits than the governance of the state, and entrusted the affairs of state to Alexios, who held the high Byzantine title of Caesar. Eventually, probably in 1372/73, John retired from public life altogether and entered a monastery, leaving Alexios as the ruler of Thessaly.

Alexios was married to Maria Angelina Radoslava (born late 1356 or after, if she is the daughter of Irene Asanina), a daughter of the Serbian general Radoslav Hlapen, and was supported by the powerful local magnates. Around 1382, Alexios sought the protection of the Byzantine Empire, recognizing the suzerainty of the prince Manuel Palaiologos, who at the time governed Thessalonica as an appanage. Alexios is lastly recorded in 1388, and must have died by c. 1390, when he was succeeded by his son (or perhaps brother), Manuel. It is recorded that in 1389, the "Caesar of Thessaly" sent aid to the ruler of Ioannina, Esau de' Buondelmonti against the Albanian tribes of Epirus, and that their joint forces scored a major victory over them, but it is unclear if by that date Alexios was still alive.

Either he or, more plausibly, Manuel, was the grandfather of the mid-15th century Serbian ruler Mihailo Anđelović and the Ottoman Grand Vizier Mahmud Pasha Angelović.

== Sources ==
- Ferjančić, Božidar (1974). Тесалија у XIII и XIV веку [Thessaly in the 13th and 14th Centuries] (in Serbian). Belgrade: Византолошког институт САНУ.
- Fine, John V. A. Jr. (1994) [1987]. The Late Medieval Balkans: A Critical Survey from the Late Twelfth Century to the Ottoman Conquest. Ann Arbor, Michigan: University of Michigan Press. ISBN 0-472-08260-4.
- Kazhdan, Alexander, ed. (1991). The Oxford Dictionary of Byzantium. Oxford and New York: Oxford University Press. ISBN 0-19-504652-8.
- Stavrides, Théoharis (2001). The Sultan of Vezirs: The Life and Times of the Ottoman Grand Vezir Mahmud Pasha Angelović (1453–1474). Leiden: Brill. ISBN 978-90-04-12106-5.

Preceded by John Uroš	Ruler of Thessaly (under the Byzantine Empire from c. 1382) c. 1373 – c. 1390	Succeeded by Manuel Angelos Philanthropenos
