= Persian hagiography =

Literary genre of biographies about holy people

Hagiography is the literary genre of biographies about holy people. In Islamic Persia, hagiography developed as a genre during the eleventh century CE, in Khurāsān, a region from which many eastern Ṣūfīs came. It tended to focus on Sūfī saints. The tradition declined around the sixteenth to eighteenth centuries CE, but was revived in the nineteenth and still exists today online.

== Pre-Islamic ==
Hagiography in Persian can be seen as going back to biographical writings about Zarathushtra. During the fifth to twelfth centuries CE, a corpus of pious tales about Zarathushtra, joined with relevant parts of the Gathas, was developed. This material formed the basis for the surviving hagiographical material on Zarathustra, which is found in Middle Persian or Pahlavi texts including the Dēnkard and the Wizidagiha, and in New Persian texts including the Zaratosht-nama and the Shahnameh.

== Islamic ==
=== Methods of composition ===
Using and developing the historiographical methods of the muḥaddithūn (scholars of the sayings and history of the Prophet), Persian scholars drew on oral tradition and their own observations to write about holy figures. However, many hagiographies also drew on earlier written sources, often adapting those sources to reflect the writers' own view of sainthood. For example, in the twelfth century CE, Muḥammad ibn Munavvar drew on and added to Jamāl al-Dīn Abū Rawḥ Luṭfallāh's Ḥālāt-u sukhanān-i Shaykh Abū Saʿīd Abū l-Khayr to create his own Asrār al-tawḥid fī maqāmāt al-Shaykh Abū Saʿīd (“Secrets of oneness in the spiritual stages of Shaykh Abū Saʿīd”). In doing so, he focused on mystical joys and blessed states.

Traditionally, Islamic scholarship has read Persian saints' lives fairly uncritically as biographical sources for real historical events. More recent work, partly inspired by Western scholarship on medieval Christian hagiography, however, has moved away from seeing hagiographies as repositories of facts, in favour of seeing them as literary creations reflecting the aesthetic, theological, and political agendas of their composers.

=== Major works ===
Key early works of Persian hagiography included:

- Kashf al-maḥjūb (“Revelation of the veiled realities”) by Abū l-Ḥasan Hujvīrī (d. 465/1072–73)
- Ṭabaqāt al-Ṣūfiyya (“Generations of the Ṣūfīs”) by ʿAbdallāh al-Ansārī (d. 481/1088)
- Ḥālāt-u sukhanān-i Shaykh Abū Saʿīd Abū l-Khayr (“Spiritual states and sayings of Shaykh Abū Saʿīd Abū l-Khayr”) by Jamāl al-Dīn Abū Rawḥ Luṭfallāh (d. 541/1146–47).
- The Life of Aḥmad-i Jām (d. 536/1141) by Sadīd al-Dīn Muḥammad Ghaznavī (fl. c. 530–600/1136–1205). This emphasised the supposed miracles performed by its subject.

Important later Persian hagiographers included:

- Aflākī (d. 761/1360), a disciple of Rumi's grandson who wrote Manāqib al-ʿārifīn (“Virtues of the gnostics”), completing the work in 754/1354. This focused on key figures of the sufi order of the Mawlawiyya and is dedicated to Mawlānā Rūmī (d. 672/1273) and his followers.
- ʿAbd al-Razzāq Kirmānī (d. after 911/1505), who wrote a Life of Shāh Niʿmatallāh (d. 834/1430–1), emphasising the subject's simple, agrarian life and distancing him from politics both worldly and sectarian.

Production of hagiographies declined during the Safavid period (1501–1722) due to their anti-Sūfī policies. But the dynasties of the Zand (1751–51) and Qajar (1779–1925) oversaw the partial revival of Sūfī orders and, correspondingly, hagiography. One example is Abū l-Qāsim Rāz Shīrāzī's nineteenth-century Tadhkirat al-awliyā. In the twenty-first century, hagiography continues to be produced and circulated on the Internet, particularly among Baluch or Kurdish Sunnī minorities

=== Major compilations ===
The classic hagiographical collection in Persian scholarship, ranging in its subject matter from the Balkans to Central Asia, was Tadhkirat al-awliyāʾ (“Biographies of the saints”), composed by ʿAṭṭār (d. 618/1221).

Later, Jāmī (d. 898/1492) created a compendium containing 618 biographies, ranging across the Sūfī traditions: Nafaḥāt al-uns (“Breaths of intimacy”).

Muḥammad Samarqandī compiled Tadhkira-yi mazīd (“The great collection of biographies”) around the early sixteenth century CE. Although this is now lost, it is widely quoted in other sources, indicating its once influential status.
