= Siege of Mytilene (1464) =

- Part of the Ottoman–Venetian War (1463–1479)
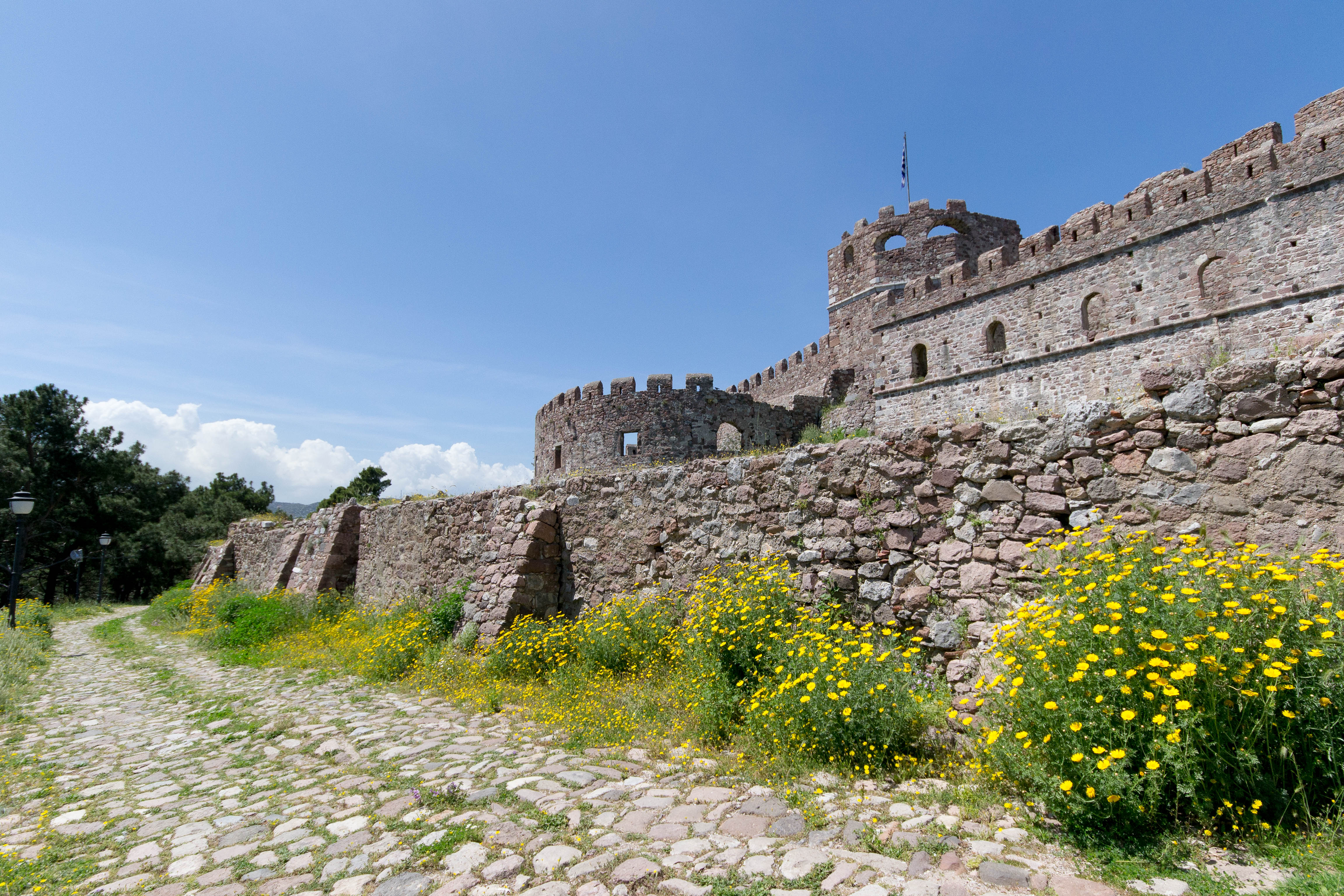
- Fortress of Mytilini
Date	1 April – 18 May 1464
Location	Mytilene, Lesbos 39°06′42″N 26°33′44″E
Result	Ottoman victory

Belligerents
Ottoman Empire	Republic of Venice

Commanders and leaders
Mahmud Angelović	Orsato Giustinian

Strength
400 men Relief force: 150 ships	34–70 ships Unknown total men: 800–3,000 infantry

Casualties and losses
Unknown	5,000 losses

The Siege of Mytilene was a military attempt by the Republic of Venice to capture the Island of Lesbos from the Ottomans. The Venetians made two attempts but were repelled, suffering heavy losses.

== Background ==
In the year 1462, the Ottomans had conquered the island of Lesbos. Two years later, the Venetian senate authorized Admiral Orsato Giustinian to attack the Ottomans. The Venetians have been worried that the Ottoman Sultan, Mehmed II, could trade the island with the Florentines. Despite other plans to capture fortresses that guard the Dardanelles, Lesbos remained the main target.

== Siege ==
The Venetians, led by Orsato Giustinian, sailed with a fleet of 32 galleys, 4 ships carrying 800 infantry, and a large number of artillery, or 70 ships that included 3,000 heavy infantry. The Venetians landed and besieged the island's capital, Mytilene. The first attack began on April 1. The Venetians had stone-hurling cannons, crossbows, and scaling ladders. At first the Venetians called the garrison to surrender, but they refused. The Ottoman garrison numbered 400 of the Sultan's heavily armored guards (presumably Janissaries).

The Venetians began bombarding the walls but only destroyed a small part, which was successfully rebuilt. Another issue was the rupture of the cannons after some shots. The Venetians attempted several assaults, either by mining or scaling ladders, but all were repelled, causing heavy losses among the Venetians. As the siege dragged on, the Sultan dispatched a relief fleet consisting of 150 vessels led by Mahmud Pasha Angelović. The Venetians heard of the relief fleet and quickly abandoned the siege on May 18, leaving their artillery behind and taking the inhabitants who joined them. The Venetians had suffered 5,000 losses during the siege.

== Aftermath ==
The Venetians retreated to Negroponte. In the following month, Giustinian attempted another landing in Lesbos, this time a raid carried out by Stratioti and galley crews, but once again failed. Giustinian and his men sailed to Methoni, where he died on July 11 due to grief over his loss at Lesbos.

== Sources ==
- Kenneth Meyer Setton (1976), The Papacy and the Levant, 1204-1571, Vol II.
- Franz Babinger (1978), Mehmed the Conqueror and His Time.
- Stefan K. Stantchev (2025), Venice, the Ottomans, and the Sea (1381–1517).
