= Manuel Angelos Philanthropenos =

Manuel Angelos Philanthropenos (Greek: Μανουήλ Ἂγγελος Φιλανθρωπηνός) was a Byzantine Greek nobleman who ruled Thessaly from c. 1390 until it was conquered by the Ottoman Turks in 1393, as a Byzantine vassal with the title of Caesar.

== Biography ==
Manuel was either the son or the brother of the Caesar Alexios Angelos Philanthropenos, who had ruled Thessaly since the early 1370s, succeeding him upon his death c. 1389/1390. Like Alexios, he recognized the suzerainty of the Byzantine emperor, and was given the title of Caesar in return. In 1389, he (or Alexios, if he was still living) sent aid to the ruler of Ioannina, Esau de' Buondelmonti against the Albanian tribes of Epirus, and their joint forces scored a major victory over them. In 1393, however, the Ottomans sent a large army which occupied Thessaly. Manuel was thus the last Christian ruler of the entire region until 1878, when it became part of the Kingdom of Greece. Either he or (less likely) Alexios was the grandfather of the Serbian ruler Mihailo Anđelović and the Ottoman Grand Vizier Mahmud Pasha Angelović.

His daughter Anna Philanthropene married Emperor Manuel III of Trebizond.

== Sources ==
- Fine, John V. A. Jr. (1994) [1987]. The Late Medieval Balkans: A Critical Survey from the Late Twelfth Century to the Ottoman Conquest. Ann Arbor, Michigan: University of Michigan Press. ISBN 0-472-08260-4.
- Kazhdan, Alexander, ed. (1991). The Oxford Dictionary of Byzantium. Oxford and New York: Oxford University Press. ISBN 0-19-504652-8.
- Miller, William (1969) [1926]. Trebizond: The last Greek Empire of the Byzantine Era: 1204-1461. Chicago: Argonaut.
- Stavrides, Théoharis (2001). The Sultan of Vezirs: The Life and Times of the Ottoman Grand Vezir Mahmud Pasha Angelović (1453–1474). Leiden: Brill. ISBN 978-90-04-12106-5.

Preceded by Alexios Angelos Philanthropenos	Ruler of Thessaly (under the Byzantine Empire) ca. 1390–1393	Ottoman conquest of Thessaly
