= Kürkçü Han =

Caravanserai in Istanbul, Turkey

Coordinates: 41°0′47.2″N 28°58′12.3″E

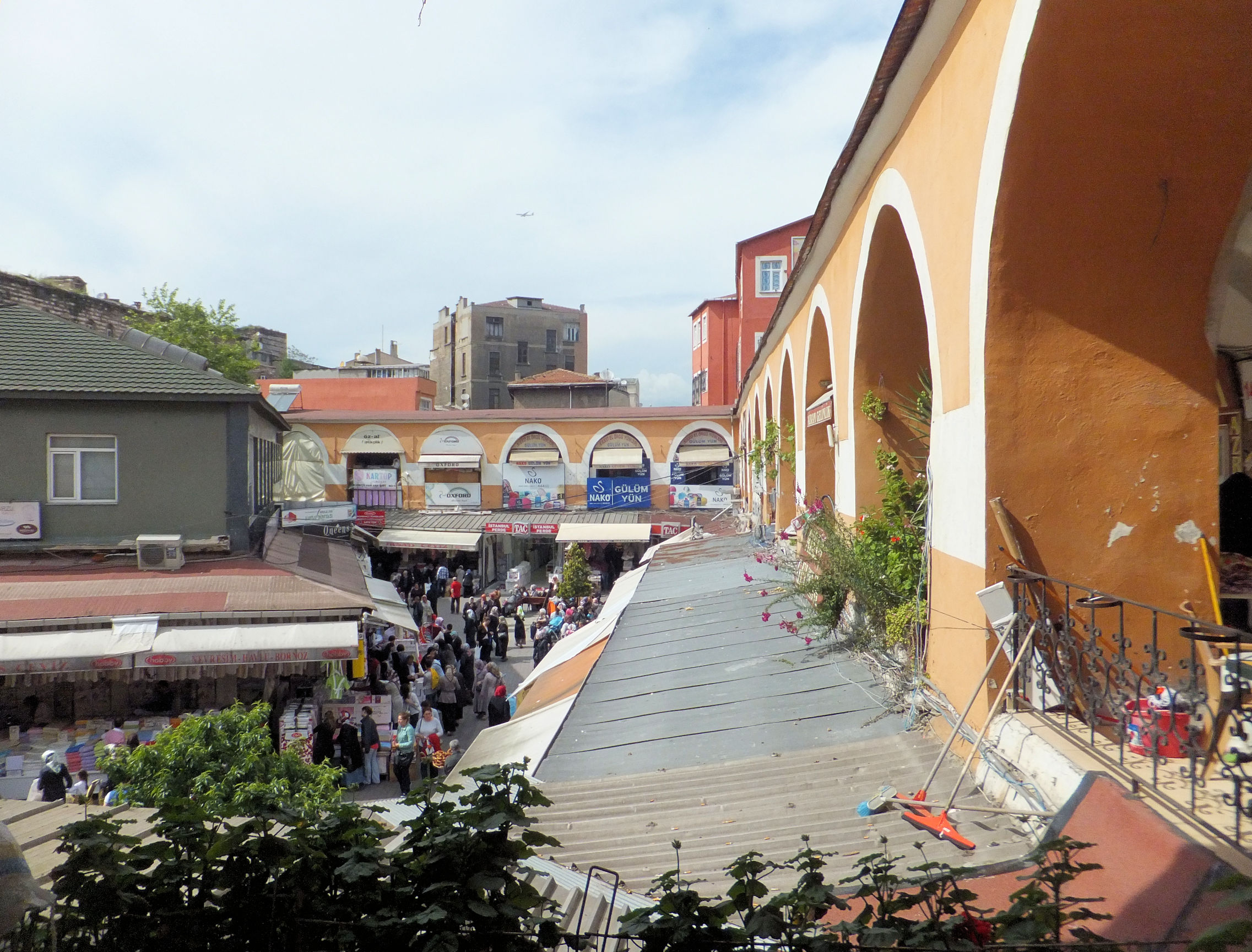
The main (southern) courtyard of the han today

The Kürkçü Han (Turkish: Kürkçü Han, lit. 'Inn of the Furriers') is a large historic han (caravanserai) in Istanbul, Turkey. Founded by Mahmud Pasha, the grand vizier of Mehmet II, it was completed in 1467 and is the oldest surviving caravanserai in the city, although it has been modified, partly ruined, and renovated over the centuries.

== Historical background ==
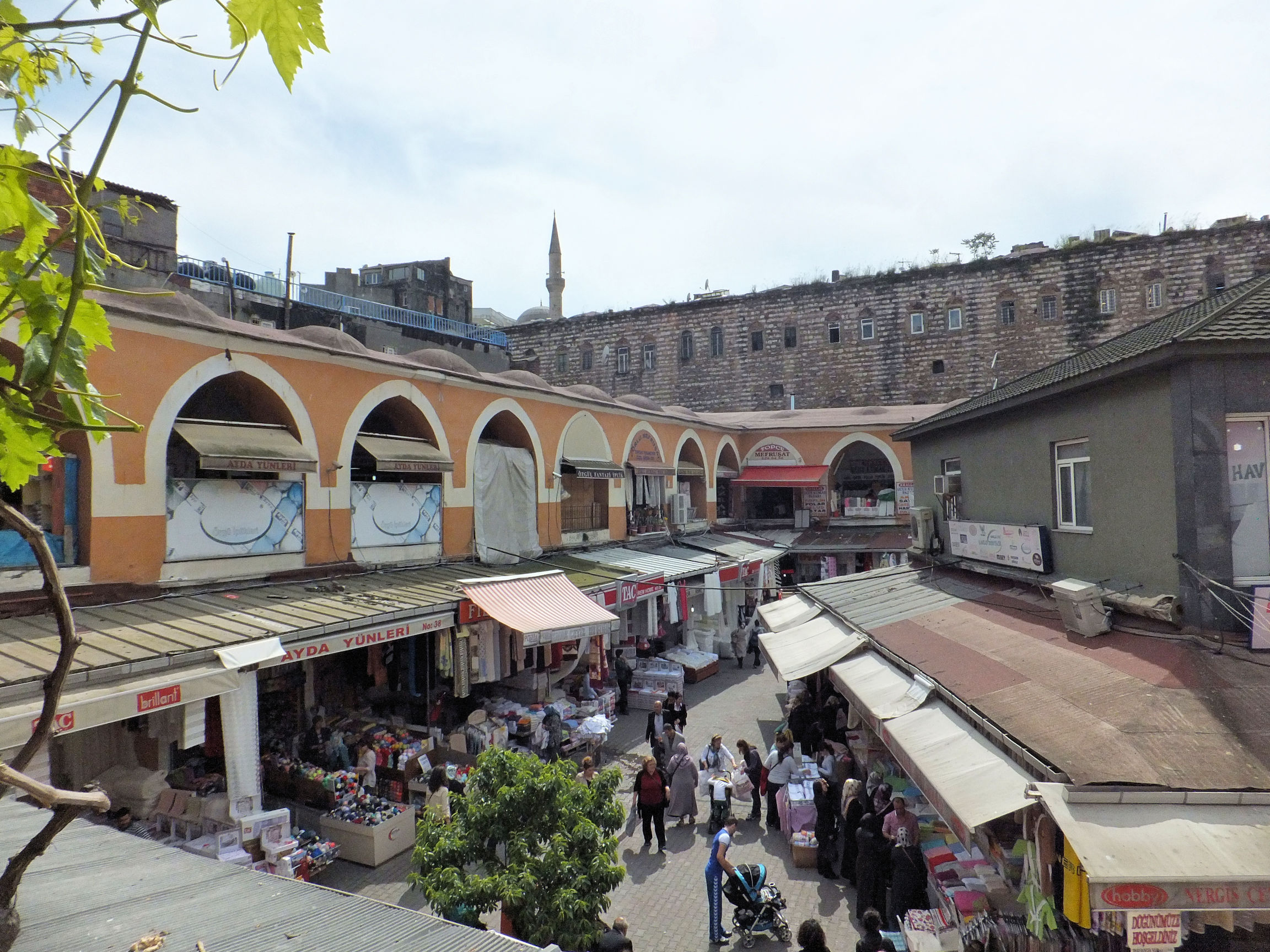
The courtyard of the Kürkçü Han, looking west; the high stone structure in the background is the 18th-century Büyük Yeni Han

The han is located in the central historic market district that extends from the Grand Bazaar to the Eminönü neighbourhood on the shore of the Golden Horn. Since the founding of the first bedesten by Mehmet II between 1456 and 1461, the Grand Bazaar developed into the city's main hub of international trade, spawning entire districts of shops, warehouses, and merchant lodgings. A han, a type of urban caravanserai, was a common type of commercial structure in Ottoman architecture (and more broadly in Islamic-world architecture) which served a number of functions including lodging for foreign merchants, storage for goods or merchandise, housing for artisan workshops, and offices from which to conduct dealings.

The Kürkçü Han was part of a religious and charitable complex, a külliye, that was founded by Mahmud Pasha, the grand vizier of Sultan Mehmet II Fatih "the Conqueror". The main part of the complex, the Mahmut Pasha Mosque, was completed in 1464 and is one of the earliest Ottoman architectural complexes in Istanbul. The waqf (endowment) of the mosque and its associated charitable buildings was quite extensive, covering a number of different buildings across the surrounding district, which suggests that Mehmet II may have entrusted Mahmud Pasha with developing this district near the commercial heart of the city, just east and north of the area which would become the Grand Bazaar. The hammam (bathhouse) of the complex, the Mahmut Pasha Hamam, is located about one block south of the han.

The caravanserai of the Mahmut Pasha complex, located a few blocks north of the mosque, is known today as the Kürkçü Han ("Caravanserai of the Fur Merchants"). It was completed in 1467 and is the oldest surviving caravanserai in Istanbul, albeit with some modifications and restorations over time. The building contributed to the revenues of the mosque's waqf foundation by collecting rent from the shops and offices which occupied its rooms. The caravanserai is still used by shops and businesses today.

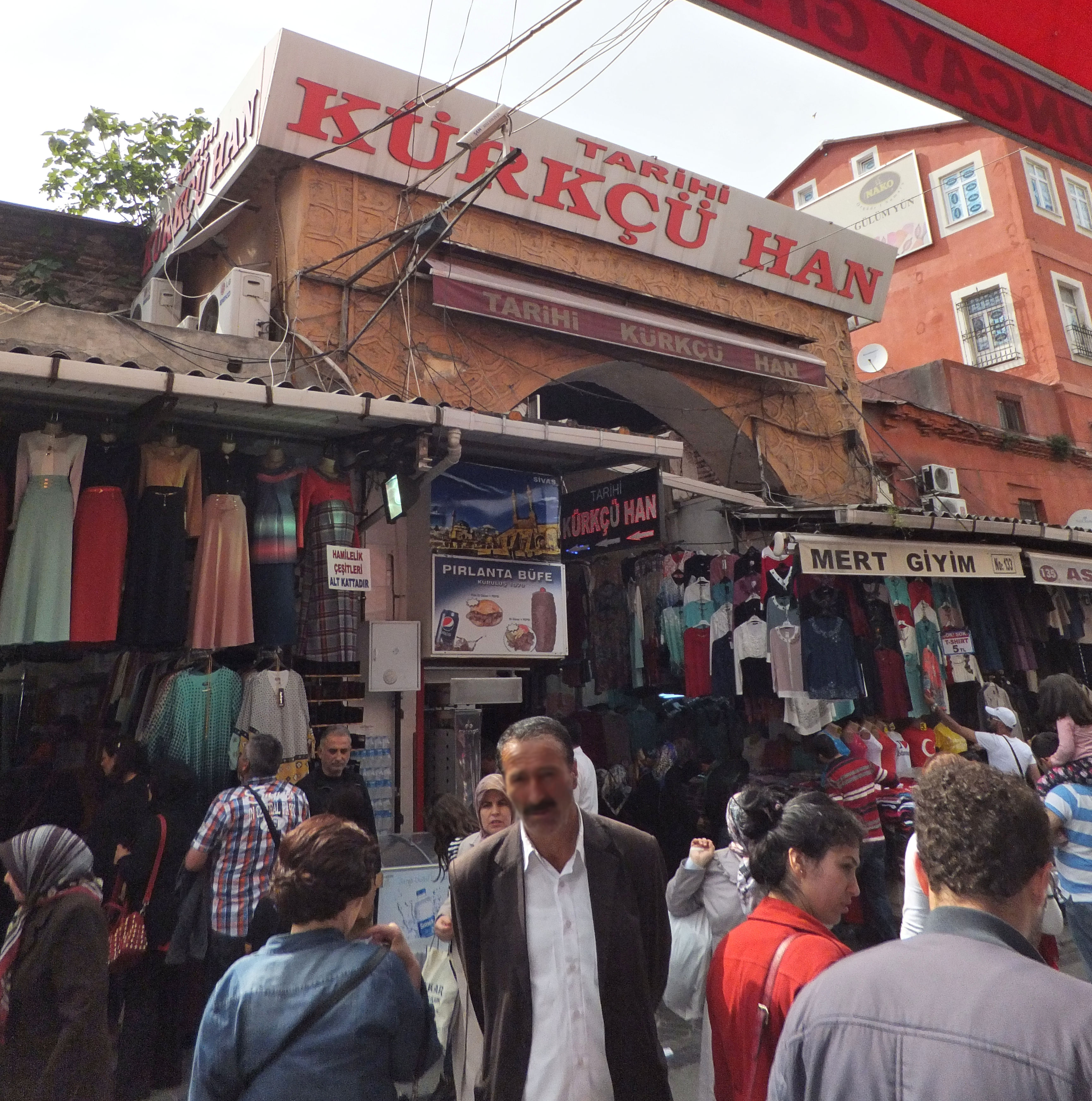
The main entrance of the Kürkçü Han today

== Architecture ==
The han's form is typical of the earlier urban caravanserais built in Ottoman cities like Bursa. It consisted of two large adjacent courtyards: an almost square one to the south, which remains relatively intact, and a more irregularly-shaped one to the north which has not been well preserved. A more modern rectangular mosque now occupies the center of the main south courtyard but originally there was probably a fountain and a small mosque (mescit) here instead. The courtyard is surrounded by a two-story arched gallery which gave access to numerous rooms across two stories. The total number of rooms historically available in the han varies depending on the sources consulted. By one count it may have been around 167. By another count, the two stories around the south courtyard had about 45 rooms each while the north courtyard had about 30 rooms on each of its two stories (roughly 150 in total). The han's main entrance gate today is on its eastern side.

== See also ==
- Büyük Valide Han
- Büyük Yeni Han
