= Büyük Yeni Han =

Caravanserai in Istanbul, Turkey

Coordinates: 41°0′48.2″N 28°58′9.4″E

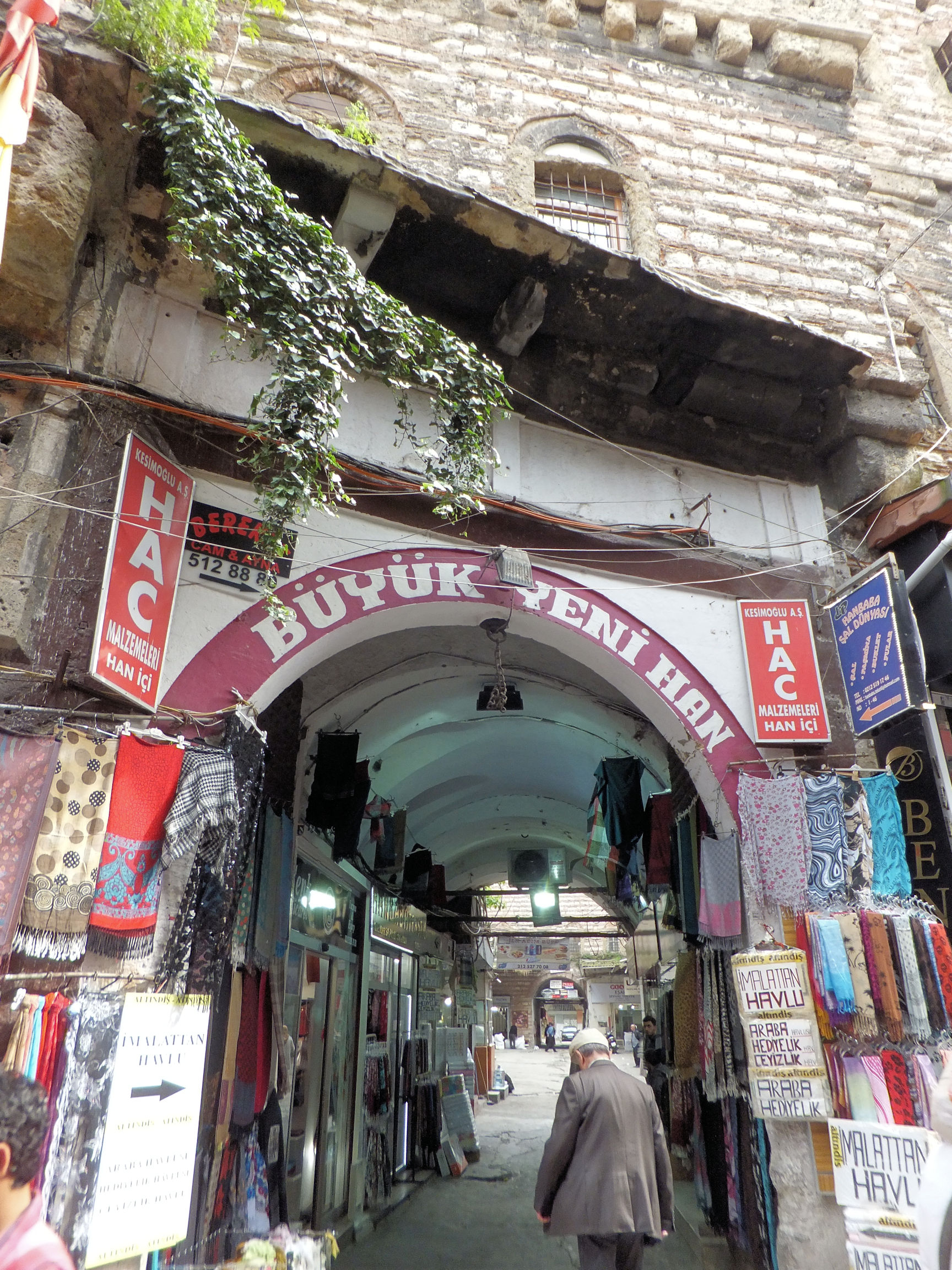
The main entrance of the Büyük Yeni Han today

The Büyük Yeni Han (Turkish: Büyük Yeni Han, lit. 'large new inn') is a large historic han (caravanserai) in Istanbul, Turkey. It was founded by Sultan Mustafa III and completed in 1764 CE (1177 AH). It is the second largest historic caravanserai in the city.

== History ==
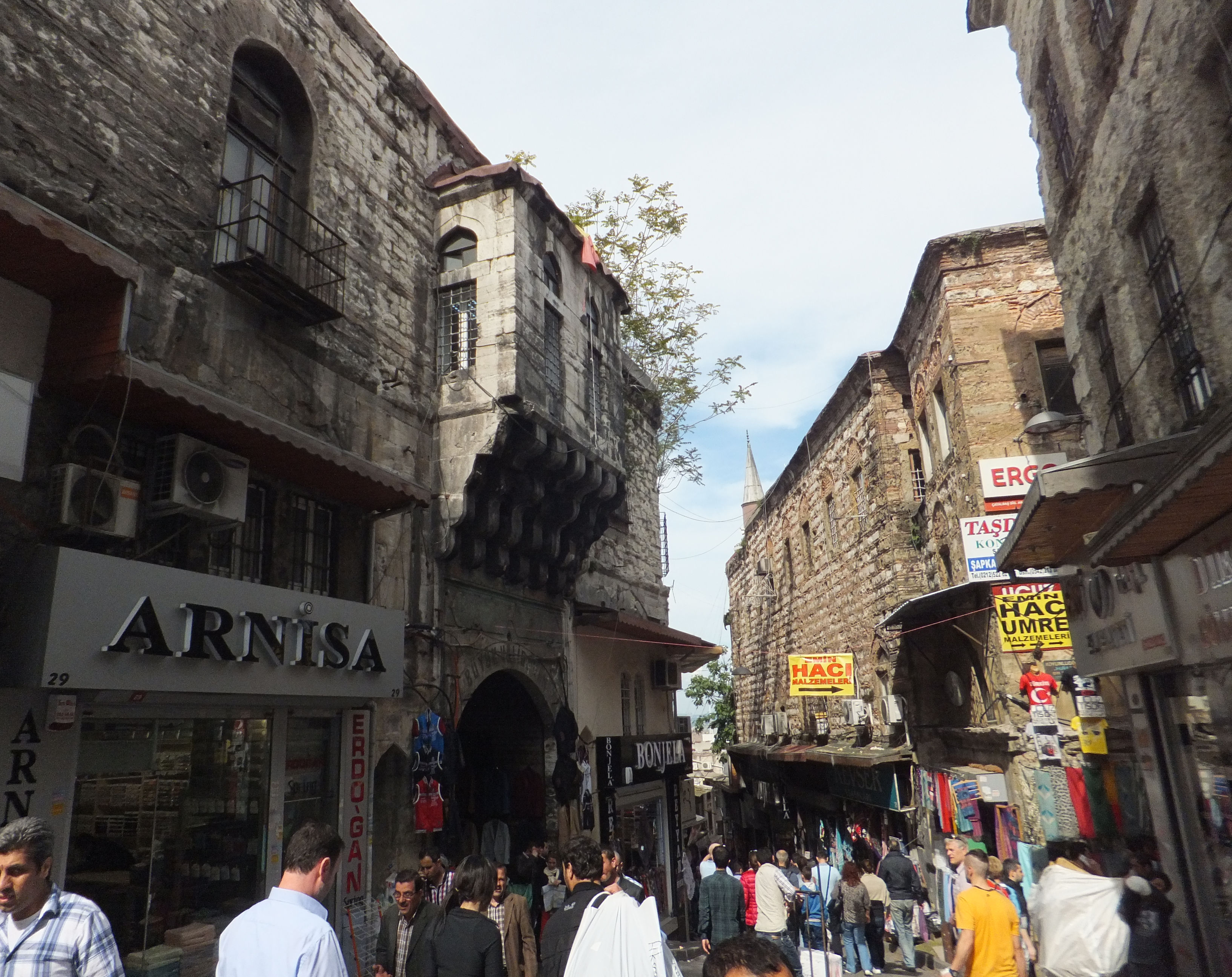
Mercan Caddesi (street) in the commercial district north of the Grand Bazaar where the Büyük Yeni Han is located. On the right is the Küçük Yeni Han, built at the same time, while on the left is a larger and older han, the Büyük Valide Han.

The han is located in the central historic market district that extends from the Grand Bazaar to the Eminönü neighbourhood on the shore of the Golden Horn. Since the founding of the first bedesten by Mehmet II in the mid-15th century, the Grand Bazaar developed into the city's main hub of international trade, spawning entire districts of shops, warehouses, and merchant lodgings. A han, a type of urban caravanserai, was a common type of commercial structure in Ottoman architecture (and more broadly in Islamic-world architecture) which served a number of functions including lodging for foreign merchants, storage for goods or merchandise, housing for artisan workshops, and offices from which to conduct dealings. A number of hans were built over the centuries in and around the Grand Bazaar district.

The Büyük Yeni Han was completed in 1763 or 1764 CE (1177 AH) on the orders of Sultan Mustafa III. Records show that the land for the new building was procured in 1761 partly through a series of property exchanges negotiated with the existing waqfs (official foundations established through Islamic endowments) and other properties on the site. For example, one piece of the land, a plot of around 523 square meters belonging to the waqf of Çavuşbaşı Ali Agha, was obtained in exchange for various other properties throughout Istanbul in an agreement dated to August 2-11, 1761. Another plot of land occupied by a house, covering around 402 square meters, was obtained in exchange for an estate house in the Edirnekapı area of the city, as part of an agreement dated to September 1-10 of the same year. The records suggest that construction thus started in late 1761, right after these (and other) agreements were concluded. Although the chief architect of the project has not been identified, the building supervisor is named in multiple documents as Şehremini Haşim Ali Bey. Some scholars believe that around this period the role of "chief architect" had decreased in importance by comparison with the construction supervisor, which suggests that Şehremini Haşim Ali Bey may have practically played a very important role in the building's design and execution. The building's completion date of 1177 AH (1763-1764 CE) is based on an inscription on its northeast corner and on the date of the waqf agreement written to govern it.

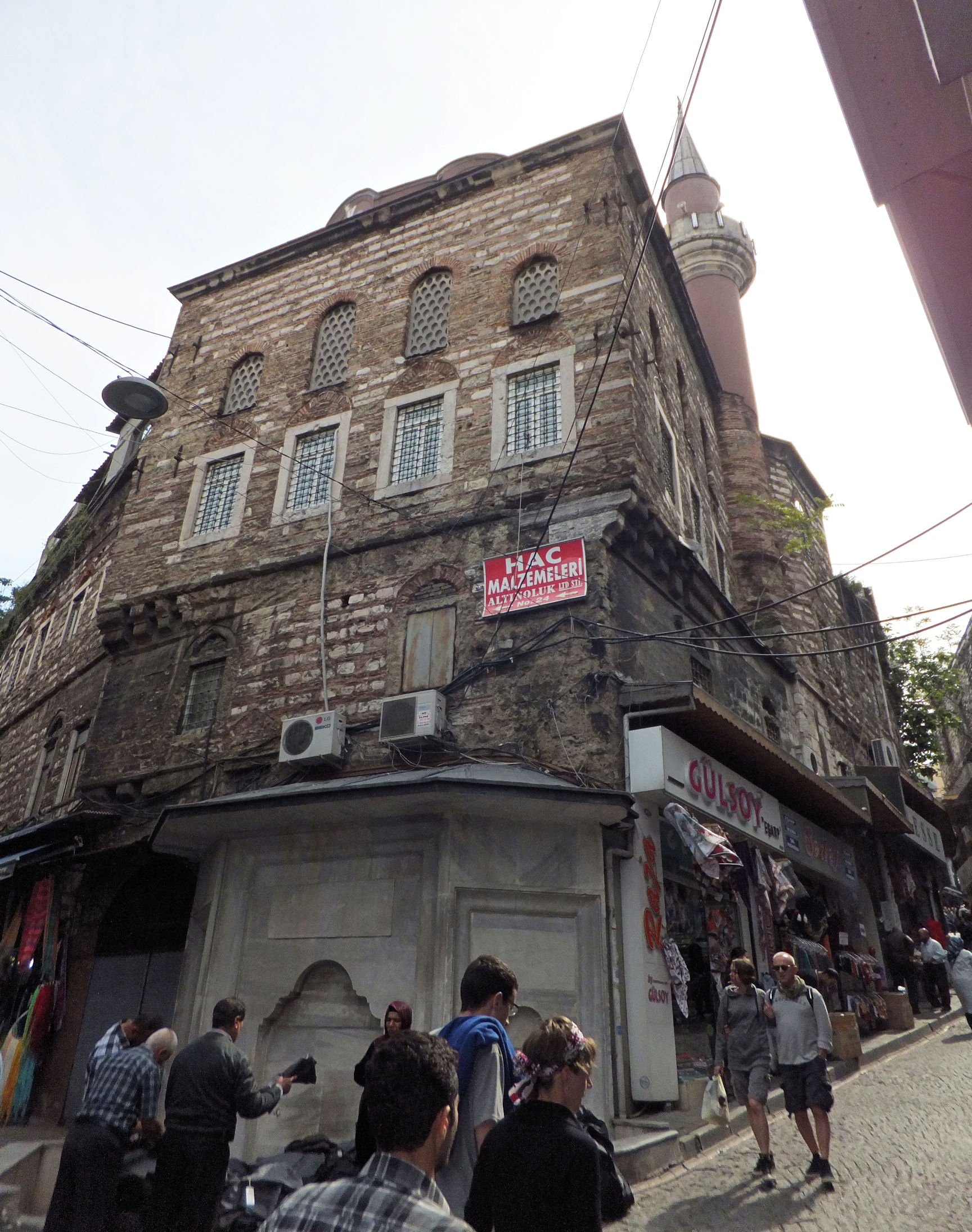
The Küçük Yeni Han, a smaller han built by Mustafa III at the same time as the Büyük Yeni Han and located just across the alley from it. Visible at the top is a small pointed minaret belonging to a mescit (small mosque) built into the upper corner of the building

The construction of the building took place alongside the construction of other commercial hans in the area (such as the adjacent Küçük Yeni Han built at the same time) and in other parts of the city (such as the Taş Han of the Laleli Mosque complex) during the reign of Mustafa III in the 1760s. This construction boom was motivated by an increasing volume of international trade and internal trade within the Ottoman Empire, with Istanbul at its heart, as well as by a wave of immigration to the city. Based on available records, Mustafa III was the first sultan since Mehmet II to have directly commissioned the construction of new caravanserais in Istanbul, as earlier hans were mainly founded by viziers or other members of the royal family.

Thanks to its grand scale the Büyük Yeni Han became one of the most important commercial buildings in this area. The building was occupied most of all by or foreign and non-Muslim moneychangers (Turkish: sarraflar, singular: sarraf), a service which was increasing in importance during the 18th century. A register dated to 1780 indicates that 74 rooms in the han were occupied by moneychangers while another 28 were occupied by other merchants. A significant majority of these moneychangers were Armenians, many of whom had been formerly based in the Grand Bazaar before the han was constructed. The sultan's construction of a han that catered to these businesses probably reflects the importance of the role that moneychangers played in the Ottoman financial system of the time, acting as financiers and guarantors for other projects or bids. All of the tenants of the han were required to pay rent regularly, which in turn provided revenues for its operations as well as for the funding of the waqf (endowment) of the major Laleli Mosque complex which Mustafa III had built around the same period. For example, records show that the Büyük Yeni Han's rent income provided about 5-6 percent of the Laleli waqf's revenues between 1770 and 1789.

Today the han is still preserved and is still occupied by various shops and businesses.

== Architecture ==
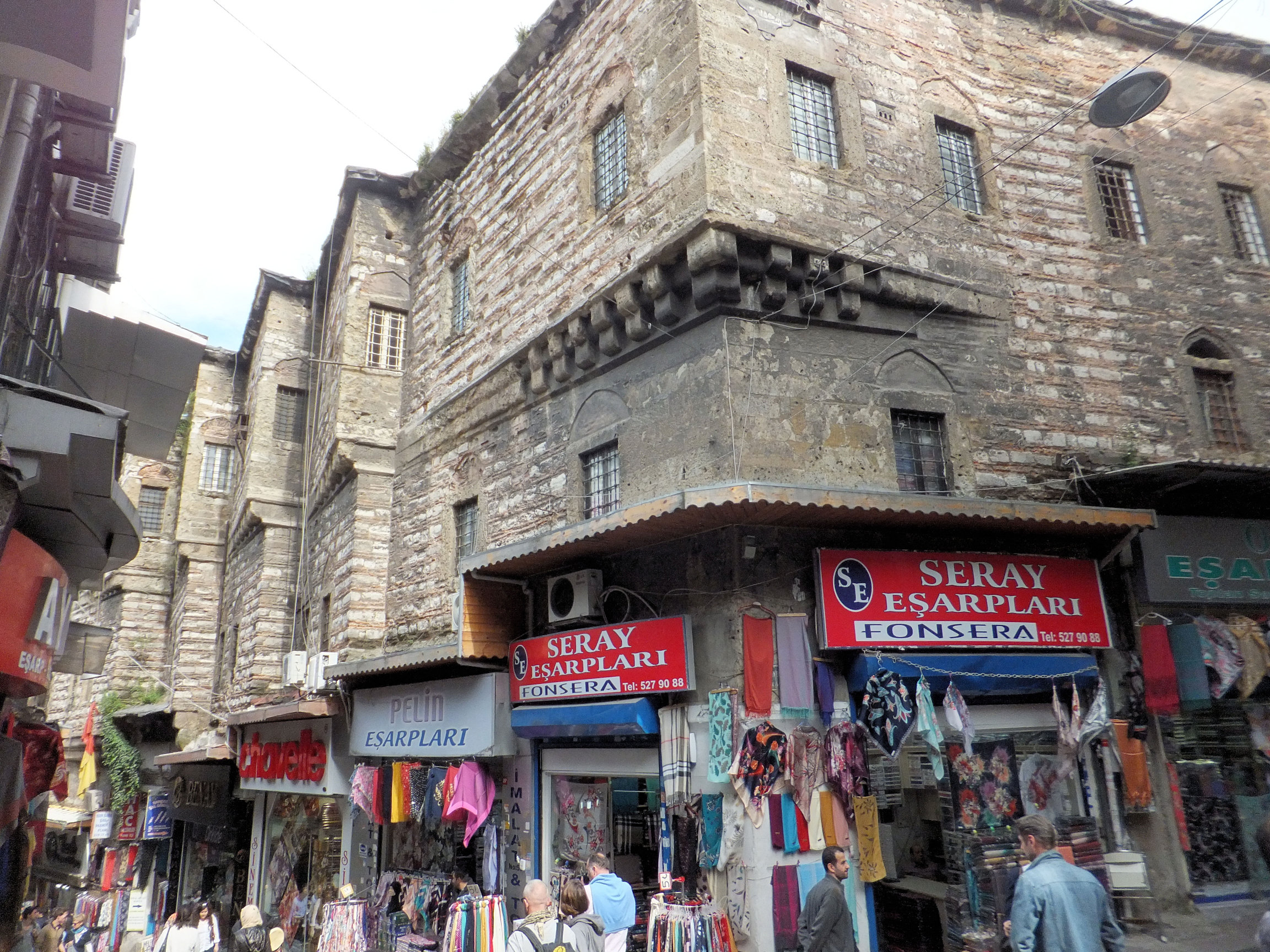
The exterior northeastern corner of the han (on Mercan Caddesi street), showing the overhanging projections of the upper-floor rooms

The han is the second largest of its kind in Istanbul after the nearby Büyük Valide Han, with a particularly long floor plan and a tall facade. It is also a notable example of an Ottoman caravanserai from the Baroque period of Ottoman architecture, which was inaugurated in part by the construction of the Nuruosmaniye Mosque complex to the south (completed in 1755). Its masonry walls feature alternating layers of light and dark stone (similar to ablaq). Its northern street facade, overlooking Mercan Caddesi (Mercan Street), features a sequence of overhanging projections above the street corresponding to the corners of the upper-floor rooms, an uncommon feature which distinguishes this building. This detail was probably intended as more than just a visual flourish: it provides a more even arrangement of space for these rooms which are located along an uneven curved street, as well as creating additional spaces for windows that provide light for the interior. The building's main entrance is also at this northern end, though there were two other entrances along the alleys on either side of the han. Another notable exterior detail was a stone birdhouse (a feature repeated in other Ottoman Baroque buildings) and a mashallah inscription located on the building's northeast corner, but the birdhouse only partially remains today.

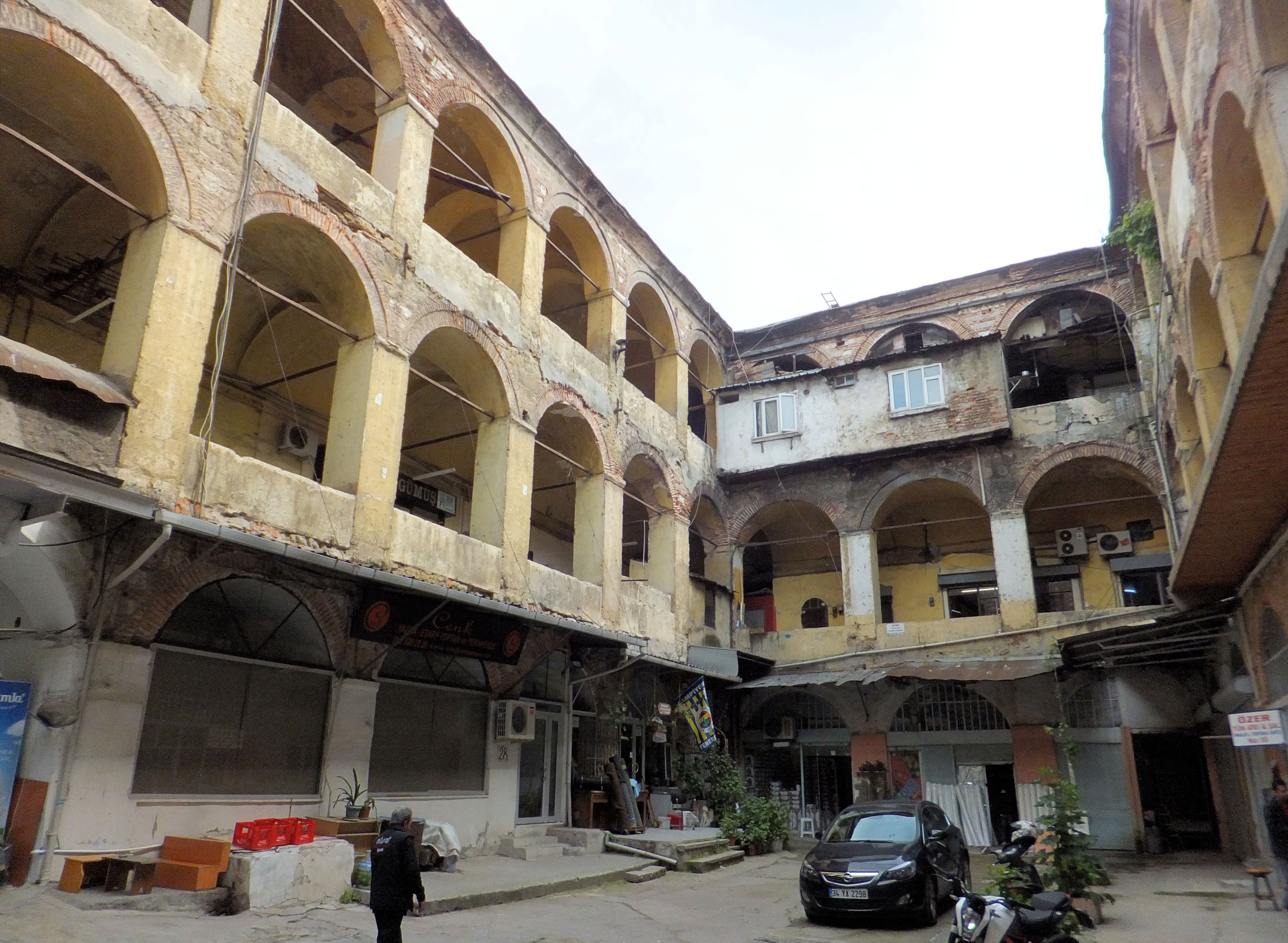
Part of the main interior courtyard today

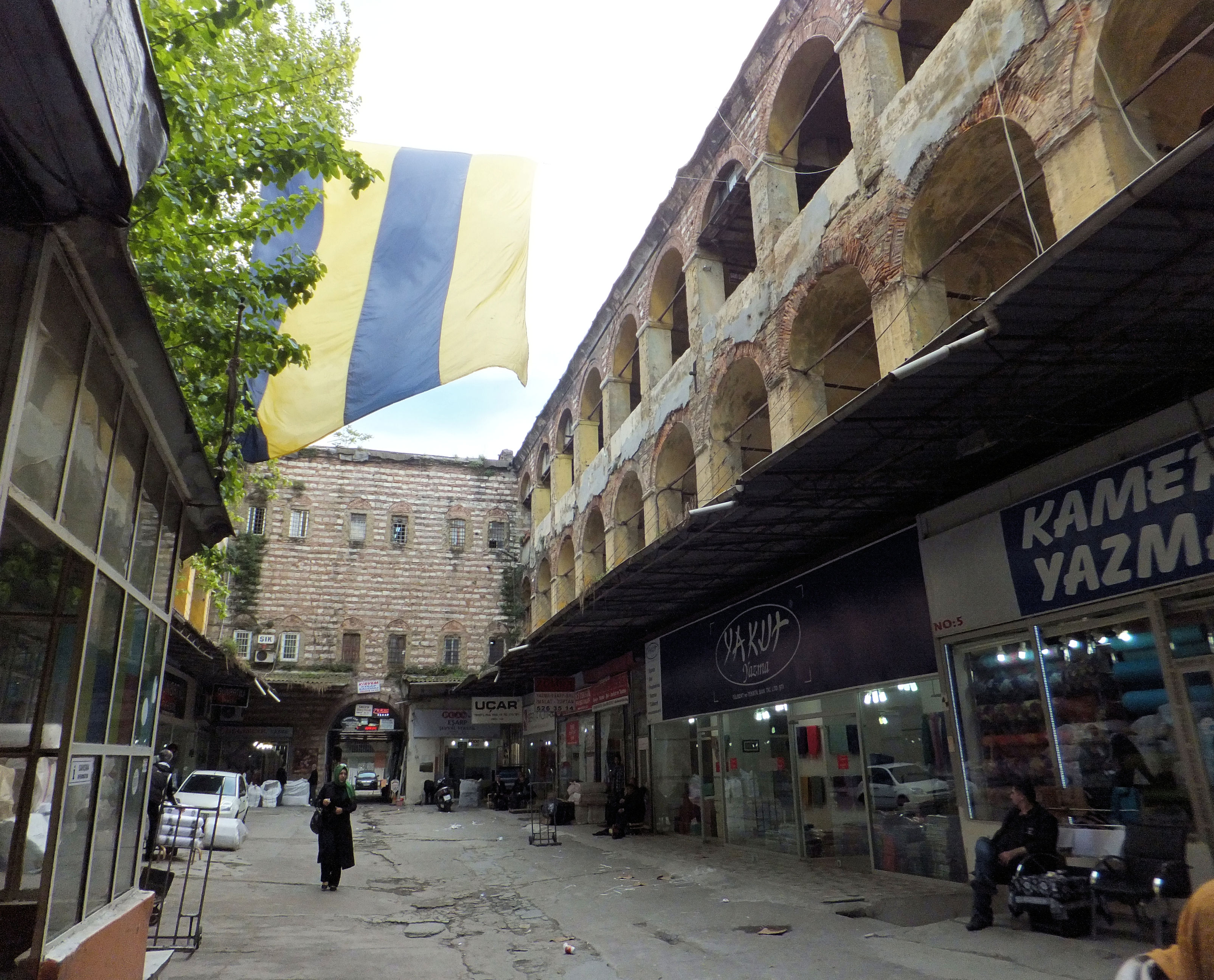
The main courtyard, with the later 19th-century dividing structure visible in the distance

Inside, the han has three floors arranged around a very long, almost rectangular courtyard. Around the whole courtyard runs a three-level gallery of arches which gives access to the various rooms across each floor. The courtyard is interrupted at around its mid-length, however, by a plain stone structure added later in the 19th century which now divides the courtyard into two, bridging the two sides of the gallery. This later division reduces the impression of the building's original grandeur. At one point the building had over 150 rooms for shops and offices, not counting various service rooms and the row of shops additionally located on its exterior western side along the street. (The exact number of rooms varies depending on the sources consulted, with Ahmet Yaşar suggesting the original number of rooms must have been 164.) The ceilings of some rooms have preserved remains of painted decoration which was characteristic of the Ottoman Baroque period, influenced by European art and illustrating small scenes of landscapes and buildings.

While the general interior floor plan of the building appears rectangular, the building's plan is actually slightly irregular because the architect was forced to make it fit in an uneven space between two streets. As a result, while the length of the entire courtyard (disregarding the later structure dividing it today) is around 85 metres, its width ranges from 15 metres at its widest (northern) end to around 12.5 metres at its narrowest (southern end).

Across the street, on the han's west side, is another caravanserai known as the Küçük Yeni Han ("Small New Inn"), also built in 1764 on the orders of Mustafa III. Integrated into the top floors of its northwest corner is a small mosque (mescit), named after Mustafa III, with a dome and small minaret. The mosque, which could be accessed directly from the street, may have been intended to serve the workers of both hans.

== See also ==
- Kürkçü Han (oldest han in Istanbul, located directly to the east)
