= Büyük Valide Han =

Caravanserai in Istanbul, Turkey

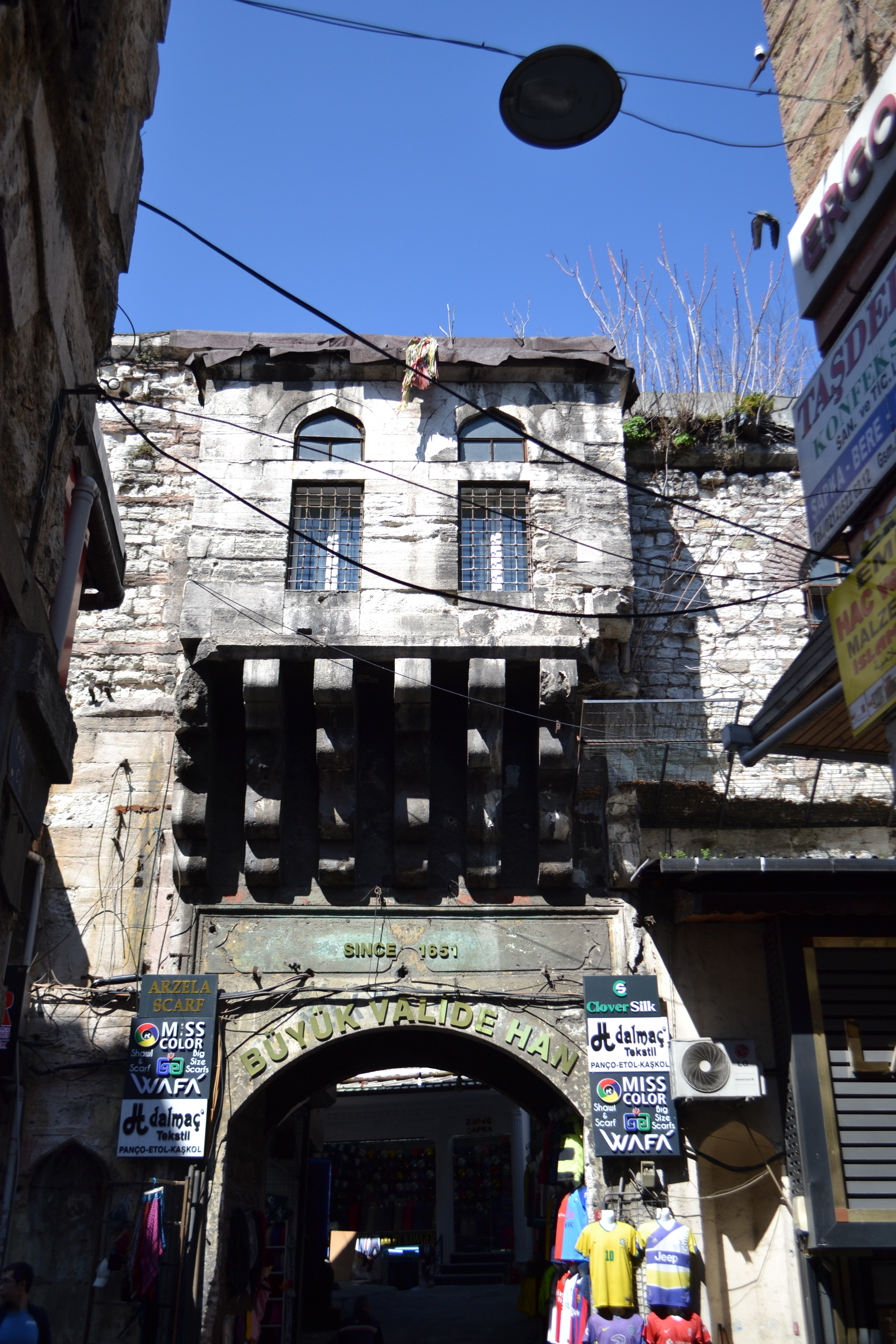
- The entrance of the han
- Interactive map of the Büyük Valide Han area

General information
- Type: Caravanserai
- Architectural style: Ottoman
- Location: Istanbul, Turkey
- Coordinates: 41°0′49.7″N 28°58′6.3″E
- Named for: Kösem Valide Sultan
- Construction started: 1651

Technical details
- Material: stone

The Büyük Valide Han (Turkish: Büyük Valide Han, lit. 'great inn of the sultan's mother') is the largest historic han (caravanserai) in Istanbul, Turkey. It was founded in 1651 by Kösem Valide Sultan, mother of the Ottoman sultans Murat IV and Ibrahim and wife of sultan Ahmed I.

== History ==
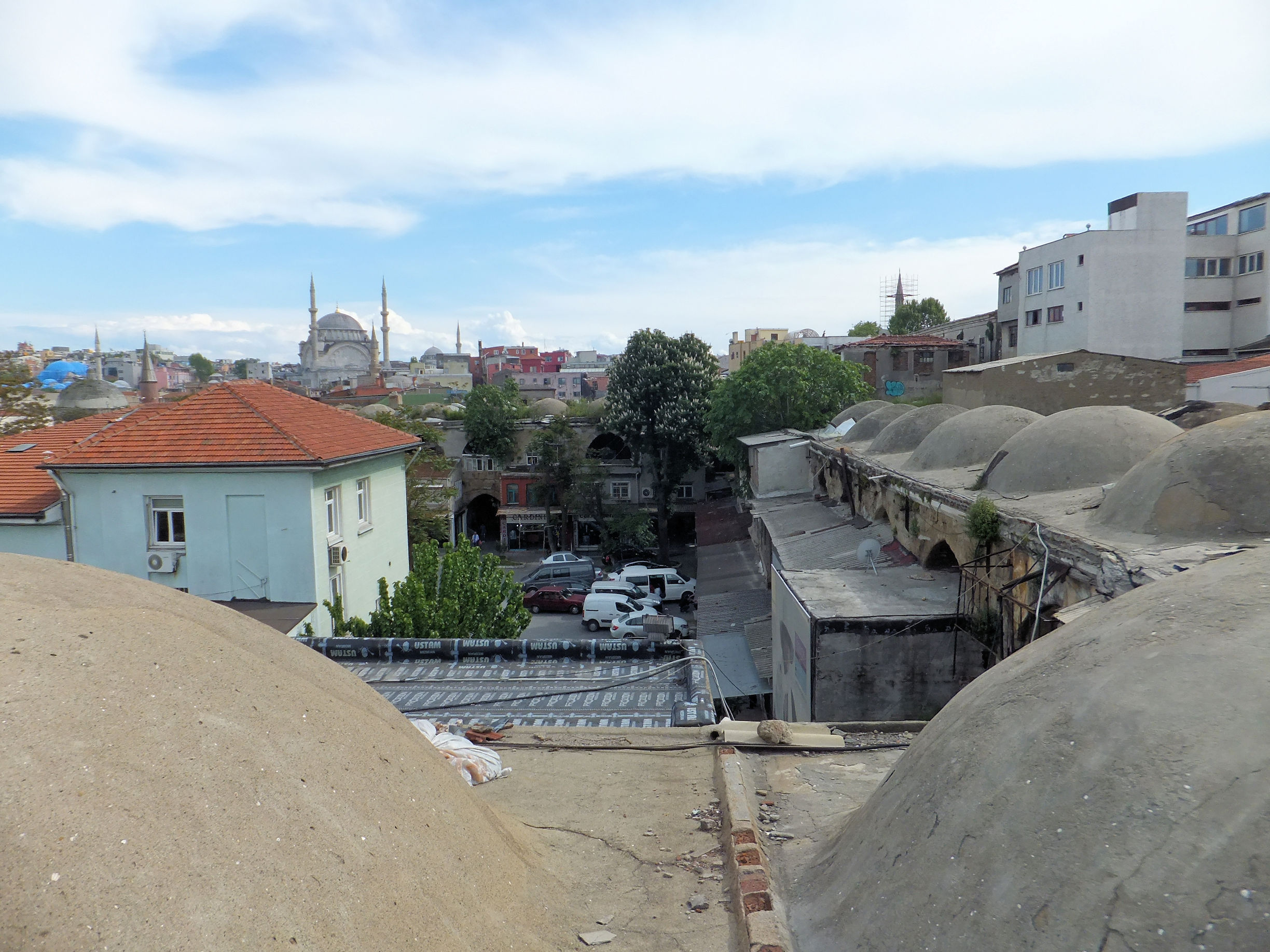
View of the main courtyard; many later add-on structures are visible over the original building

The han is located in the central historic market district that extends from the Grand Bazaar to the Eminönü neighbourhood on the shore of the Golden Horn. Since the founding of the first bedesten by Mehmet II in the mid-15th century, the Grand Bazaar developed into the city's main hub of international trade, spawning entire districts of shops, warehouses, and merchant lodgings. A han, a type of urban caravanserai, was a common type of commercial structure in Ottoman architecture (and more broadly in Islamic-world architecture) which served a number of functions including lodging for foreign merchants, storage for goods or merchandise, housing for artisan workshops, and offices from which to conduct dealings. A number of hans were built over the centuries in and around the Grand Bazaar district.

Before the construction of the Büyük Valide Han, the site was occupied by the 16th-century palace of Cerrah Mehmed Pasha. It was in this palace that one of the first printing presses in the city was set up, in 1567, by Apkar of Sivas. The han was founded in 1651 by Kösem Mahpeyker Valide Sultan, the powerful mother of the Ottoman sultans Murat IV and Ibrahim. Its revenues were used to finance the upkeep of the Çinili Mosque she had founded earlier in Üsküdar, the Asian district of Istanbul, through the use of the usual waqf system.

In the 19th century the building was inhabited by, and associated with, the Iranian merchant community. An Iranian presence in the city had long existed thanks to Istanbul's position in the Silk Road and due to invasions and political upheaval which had displaced migrants from Iran. By the beginning of the 19th century, most of the Iranian merchant community was established in a small caravanserai called Hoca Han in the Eyüp neighbourhood. However the community grew in number and importance during the 19th century following the Treaties of Erzurum (1823-1847) which allowed for the resumption of trade and diplomatic relations between the Ottoman Empire and Qajar Iran. In order to accommodate this growth, they began to move into the larger and more centrally located Valide Han. By the late 19th century, many rich Iranian merchant families held their offices here. Iranian Shi'a rituals such as celebrations of 'Ashura were also able to take place in the main courtyard of the han, where a private mosque also served the community. Thanks to the preeminence of the trade route between Tabriz and Istanbul in particular, Iranian Azerbaijanis made up the majority of the community and were specialized in import trades such as carpets and silk.

Today the han is severely dilapidated but still partly occupied by offices and businesses, though the occupants are all Turkish rather than of Iranian origin. The Iranian mosque in the middle of the main courtyard still continues to serve as a Shi'a mosque connected to the Iranian community, but it is only open for certain occasions. In recent years the han was also visited by tourists enjoying the views of the city available from its rooftop. The interior of the han also made a brief appearance during a motorcycle chase scene in the 2012 James Bond movie Skyfall.

== Architecture ==
The han covers a large area centered around a vast central square courtyard, measuring 55 meters per side, and two other lesser courtyards. While traditional caravanserais typically featured only one central courtyard, the hans of Istanbul grew in complexity over time and sometimes demonstrated irregular floor plans in order to adapt to limited space in the densely built-up city. The Büyük Valide Han's irregular layout was an example of this trend and it may have been the first example to have as many as three courtyards. The first courtyard, as one enters the building, is of an irregular but roughly triangular shape, with one side of the structure aligned with the street outside. To the north is the main central courtyard, and north of this is a smaller, rectangular courtyard which is sometimes referred to as the Küçük Valide Han (the "Small" Valide Han).

The main building has two stories; the ground floor was originally dedicated to housing camels and horses, while the upper floor was used as lodging for merchants and wholesale offices. These are accessed via a two-story gallery with vaulted corridors which surrounds the courtyards. In the middle of the main courtyard is a small mosque, which was first built for the Shi'a Iranian community in the 19th century but burned down in 1947 and was rebuilt in 1951. Although the han remains representative of the commercial architecture of its time, it has been modified frequently over the centuries in order to expand and adapt it to evolving needs. By the end of the 18th century, it had grown to hold 366 rooms. Since then, many small structures and new rooms have been continuously added onto the fabric of the old building.

The northeastern corner of the building notably incorporates the substantial remains of a large Byzantine stone tower, though there is still some dispute as to its origin. Known as the Tower of Eirene, it originally stood 27 meters tall and is the only such tower still standing in the city today. In the han's older days the tower's upper chamber was used as a mosque and its lower chamber was used as a weaving mill, but today it is largely disused.

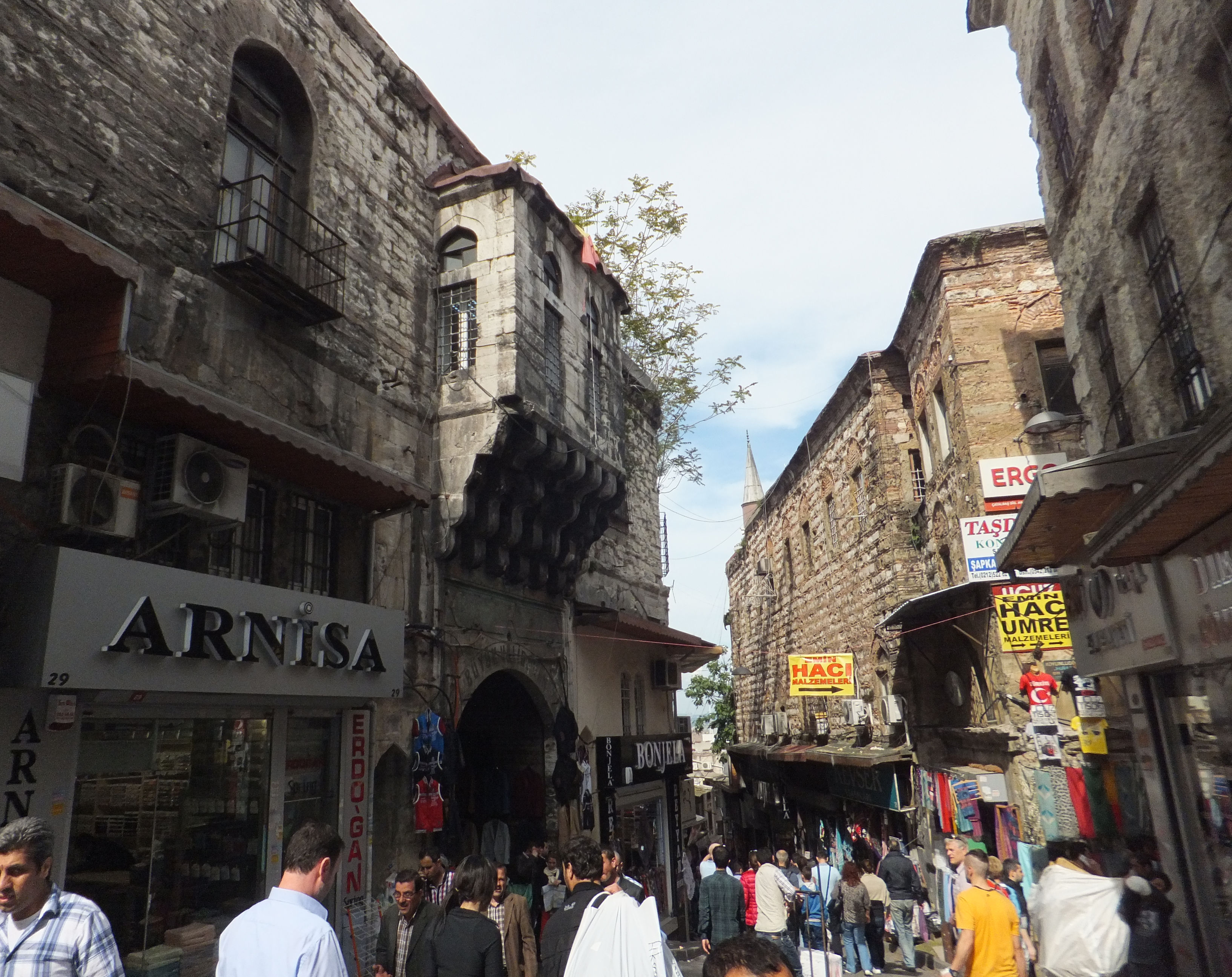
Exterior view, with the han and its entrance on the left

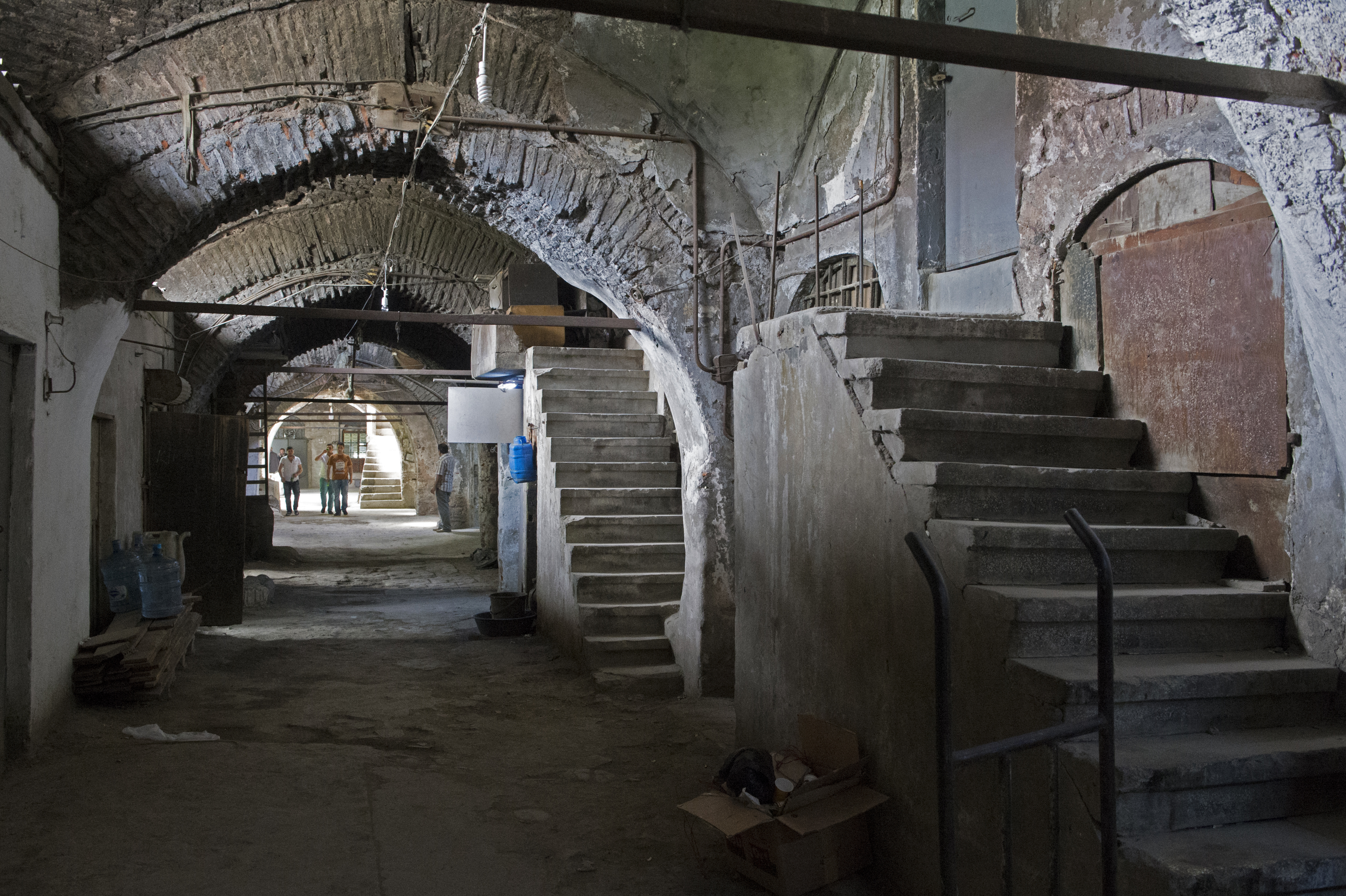
View of the corridor on the upper floor gallery

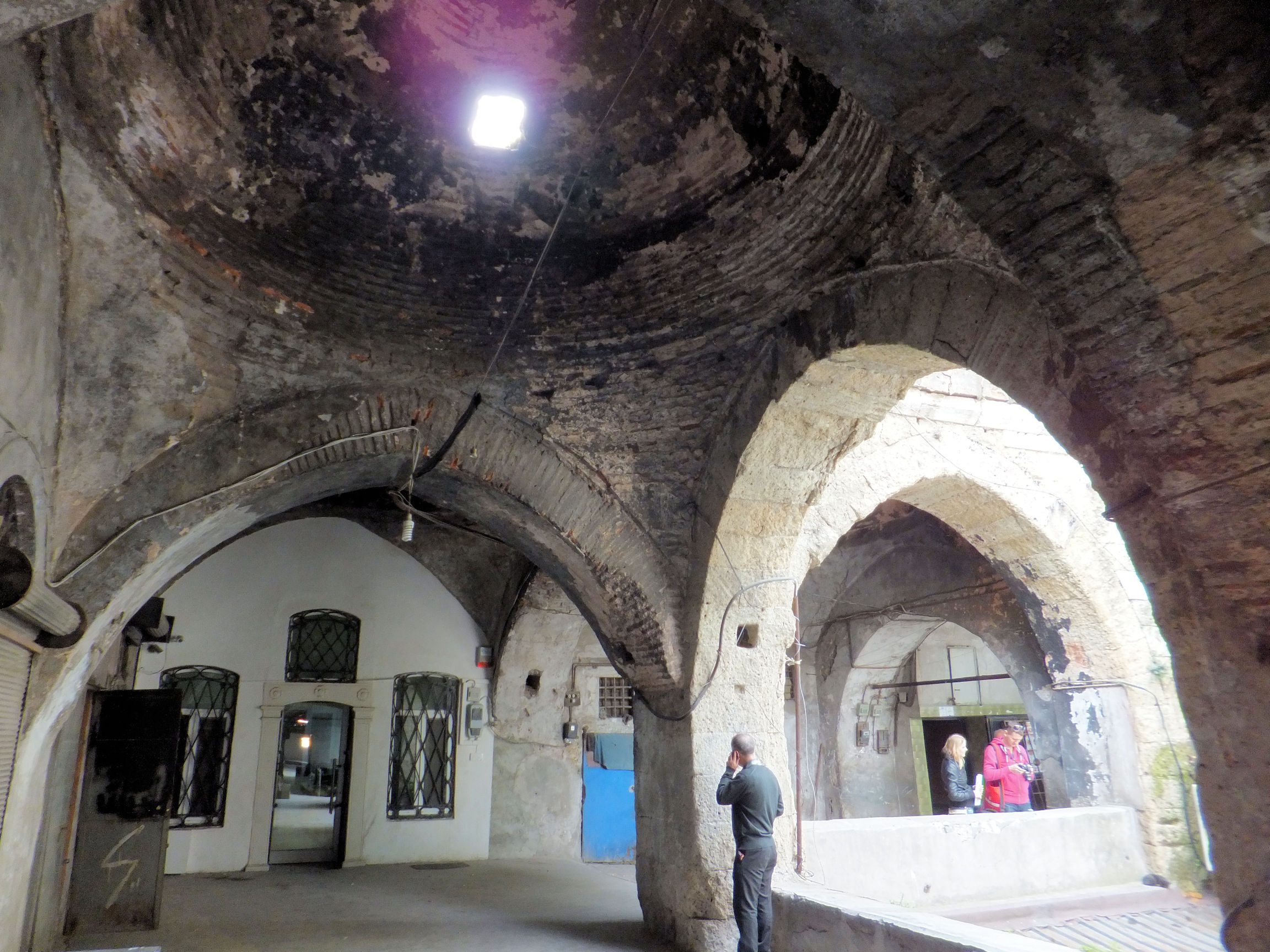
One of the domes over on the upper floor gallery around the main courtyard

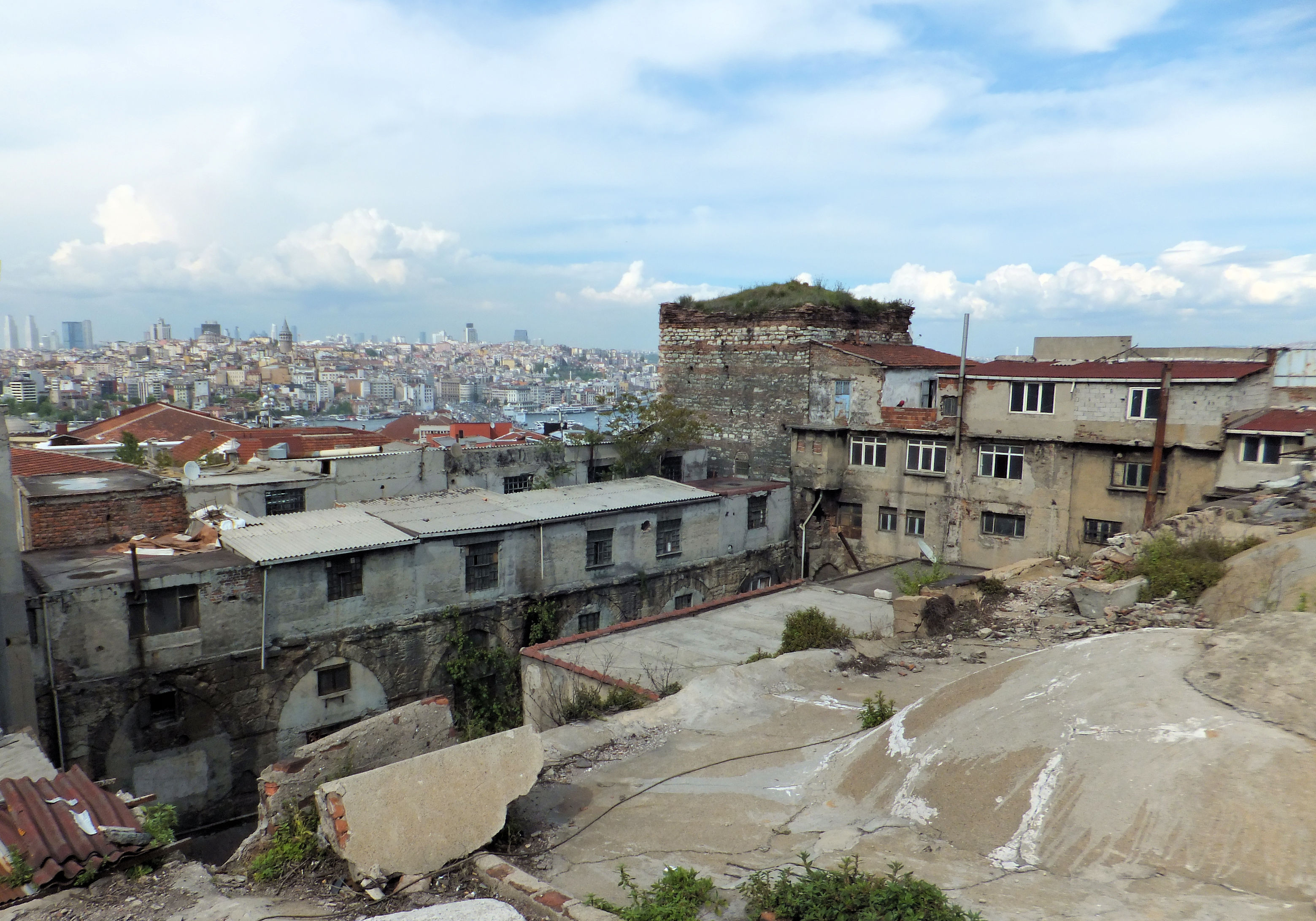
View of the smaller courtyard to the north; also visible is a stone tower thought to date from the Byzantine era (Tower of Eirene)

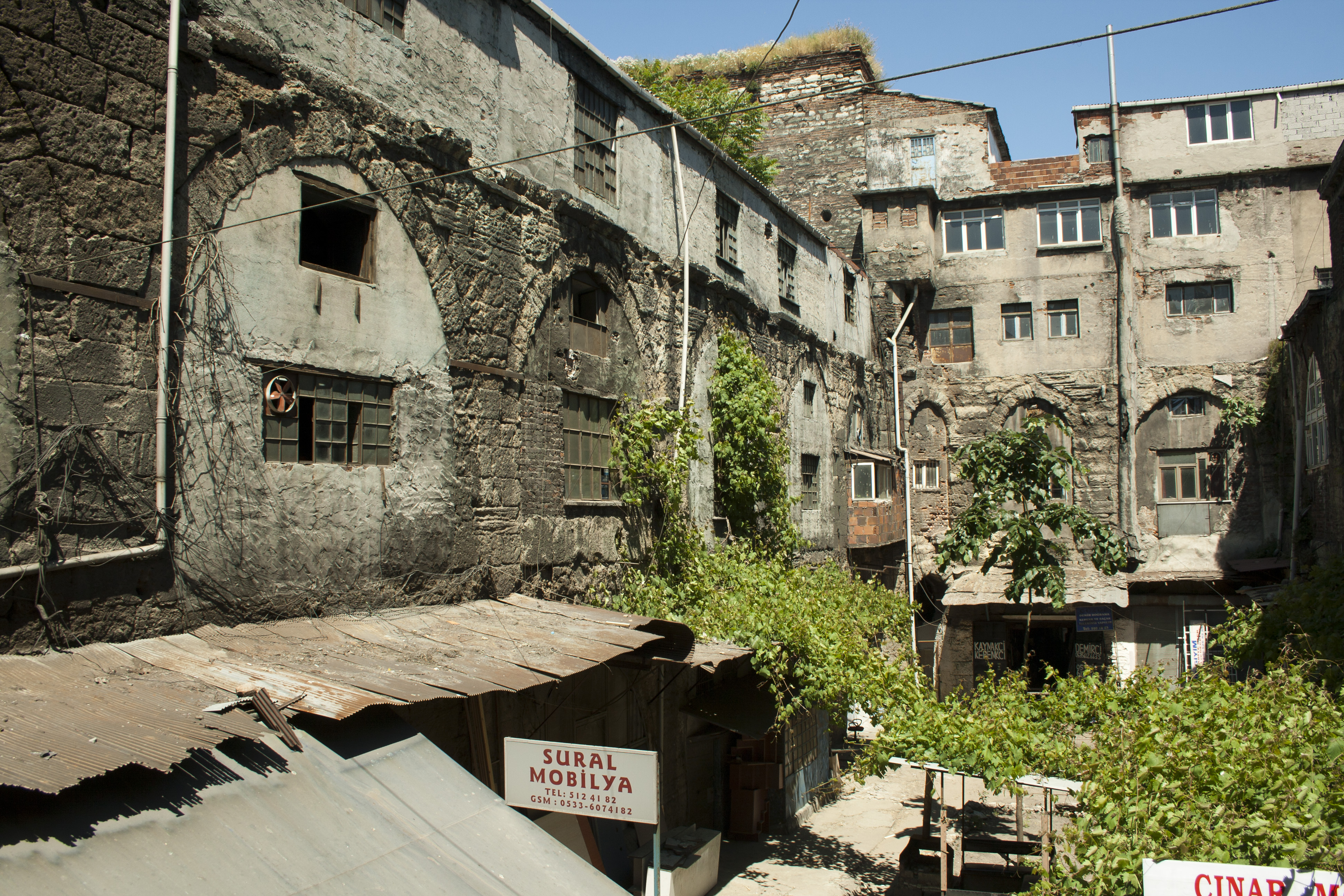
Inside the smaller northern courtyard

== Surrounding area and other nearby hans ==
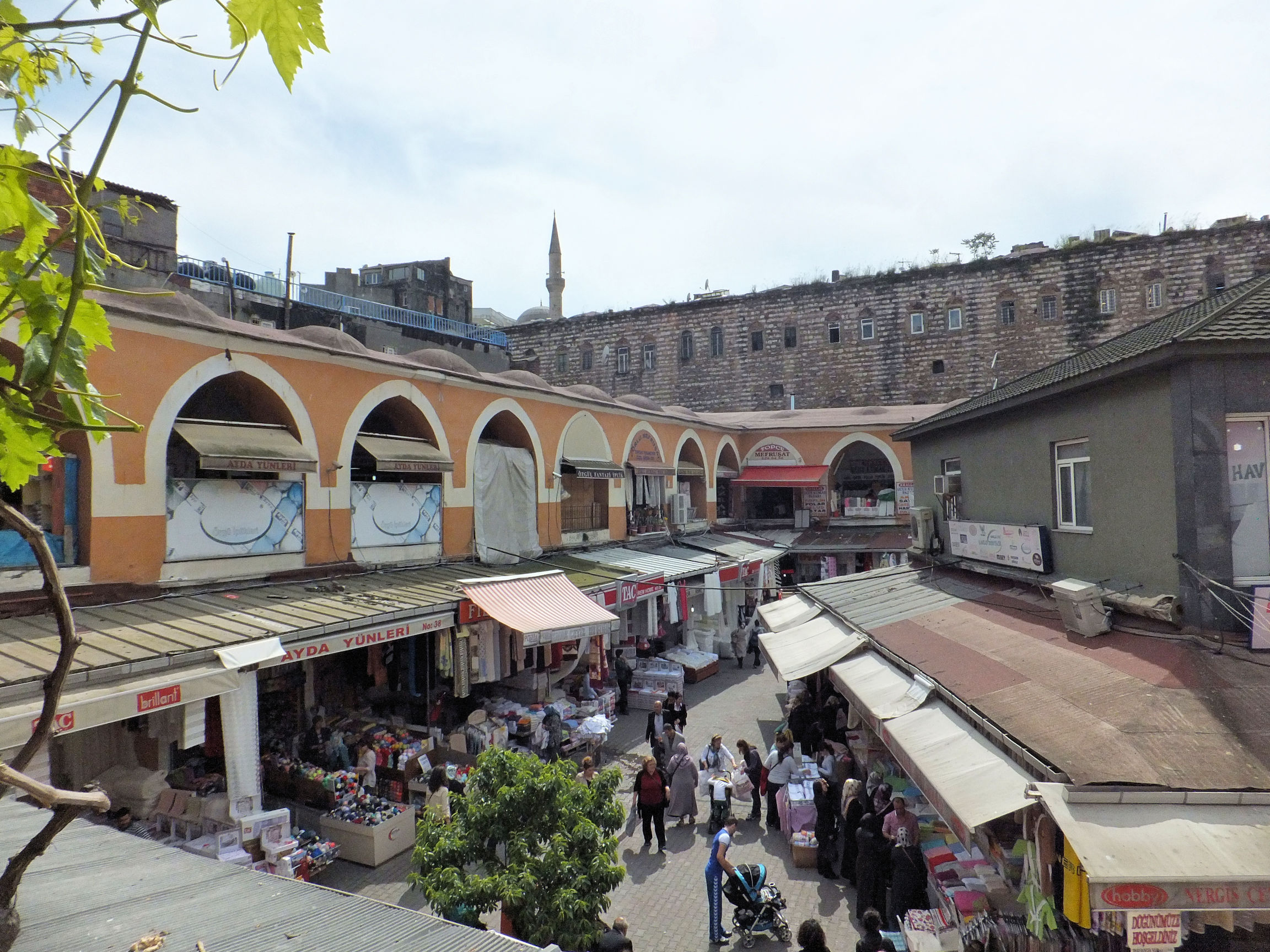
The Kürkçü Han, one of several historic hans in the surrounding area. The high stone building in the background is the Büyük Yeni Han.

As the neighbourhood of the Büyük Valide Han is at the heart of the city's historic merchant district, the area is filled with a number of other historic Ottoman commercial buildings. The Valide Han is located just east of Uzun Çarşı Caddesi (Uzun Çarşı Street) and its entrance opens onto Mercan Caddesi (Mercan Street). A number of other historic hans also adjoin this street within the same vicinity, in varying states of preservation. The most notable examples include: the Büyük Yeni Han (completed in 1764 and the second-largest han in the city after the Valide Han), the Küçük Yeni Han (built at the same time), and the Kürkçü Han (the oldest surviving han in the city, completed in 1467).
