= Çinili Mosque =

Mosque in Üsküdar, Istanbul, Turkey

- Çinili Cami
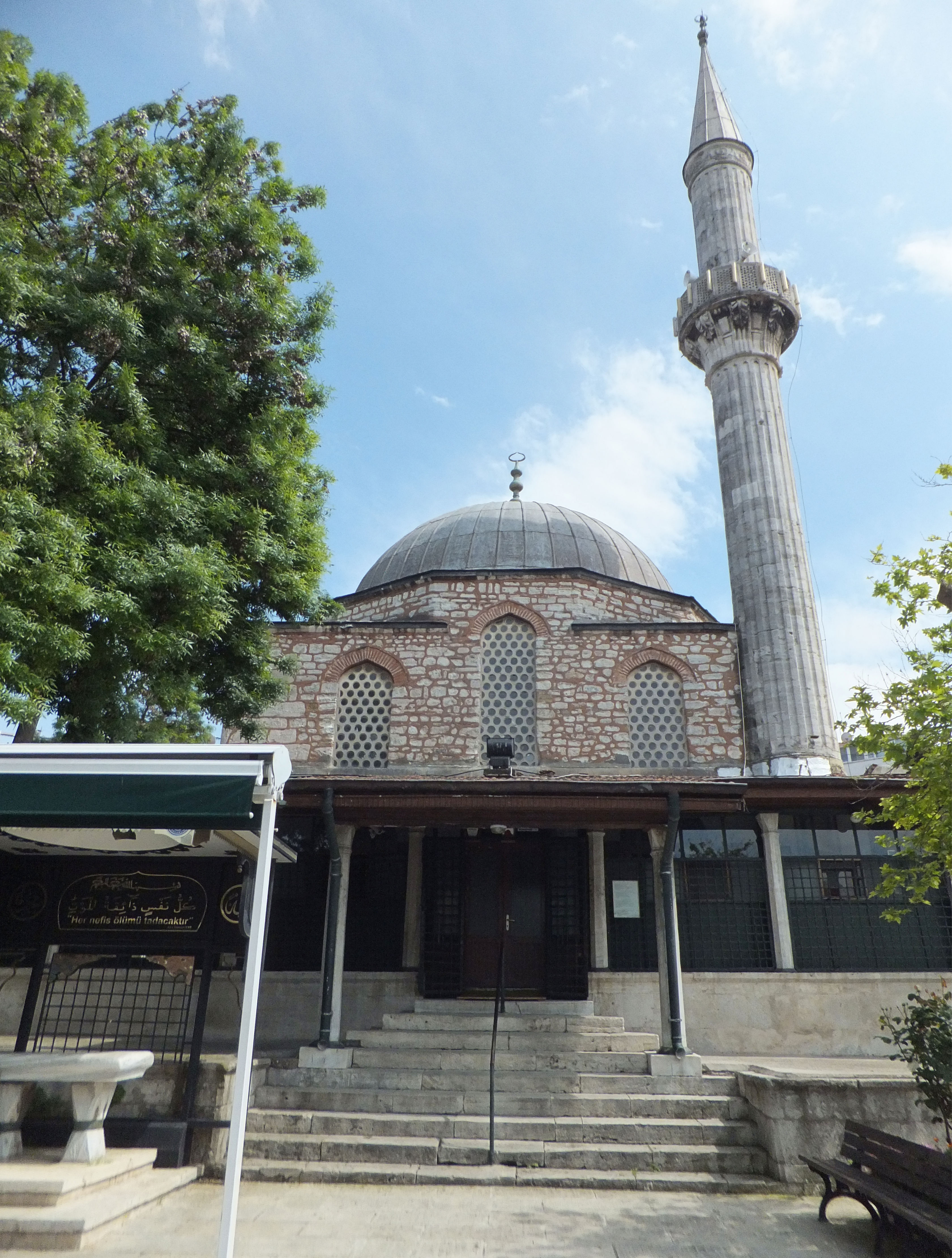
- Front view (northwest side) of the mosque

- Location within Istanbul

Religion
- Affiliation: Islam

Location
- Location: Üsküdar, Istanbul, Turkey
- Coordinates: 41°01′11.5″N 29°1′45.1″E

Architecture
- Type: Mosque
- Style: Classical Ottoman
- Completed: 1640–1

Specifications
- Dome dia. (inner): 9 metres (30 ft)
- Minaret: 1

The Çinili Mosque (Turkish: Çinili Cami, lit. 'Tiled Mosque') is a 17th-century Ottoman mosque in the Üsküdar district of Istanbul, Turkey. The small mosque is best known for its extensive tile decoration, which earned it its name.

== Historical background ==
The mosque was commissioned by Mahpeyker Kösem (Note: She was the wife of Sultan Ahmed I (d. 1617) and mother (valide) of sultans Murad IV (d. 1640) and Ibrahim (d. 1648).) and was built in 1640-1 CE (1050 AH). Its vakif (endowment) included the revenues from the Büyük Valide Han, a large caravanserai (han) built in 1651 by the same patron near the Grand Bazaar.

The mosque underwent a restoration that was completed in 2018.

== Architecture ==
The mosque has a fairly traditional plan for small Ottoman mosques, consisting of a square hall covered by a dome. The dome has a diameter of approximately 9 metres (30 ft). On the outside, it is fronted on three sides by a portico with a sloped roof. Because of the sloped terrain, the mosque is built on a raised platform. The minaret of the mosque is an addition from the later Ottoman baroque period, as evidenced by the corbels of its balcony, which feature carved acanthus leaves.

On the inside, the mosque is relatively simple and it is most notable for its extensive tile decoration, which covers most of the walls and from which it draws its name ("Tiled Mosque"). The tiles are from Kütayha, an important center of Ottoman tile production in this period. They reflect the classical period of Ottoman art and are one of the last important examples of this style, though by this time the rich repertoire of forms and colours known in 16th-century tilework had been reduced to a smaller repertoire with primarily blue, turquoise, and grey colours. In addition to floral motifs – such as tulips, peonies, and hyacinths – the tilework also features an inscription frieze running in a line across three walls on either side of the mihrab. Further inscriptions are included in tiled lunettes above the windows. Tilework also covered some of the mosque's front façade, behind the portico. The minbar (pulpit) is made of marble and richly decorated with carvings highlighted in gold, red and green paint, with more tiles covering the conical canopy at the top.

Interior of the mosque

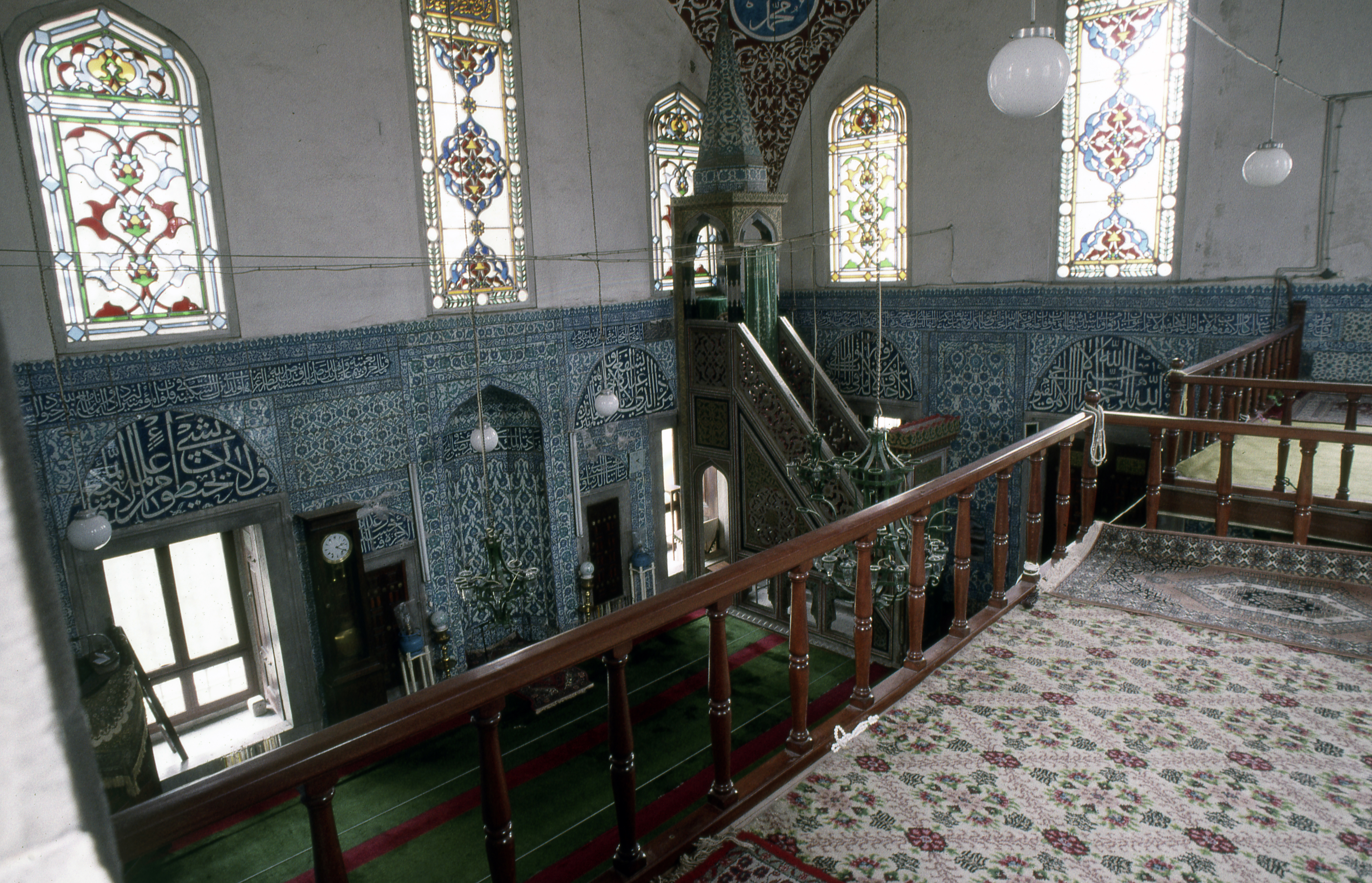
Interior of the mosque

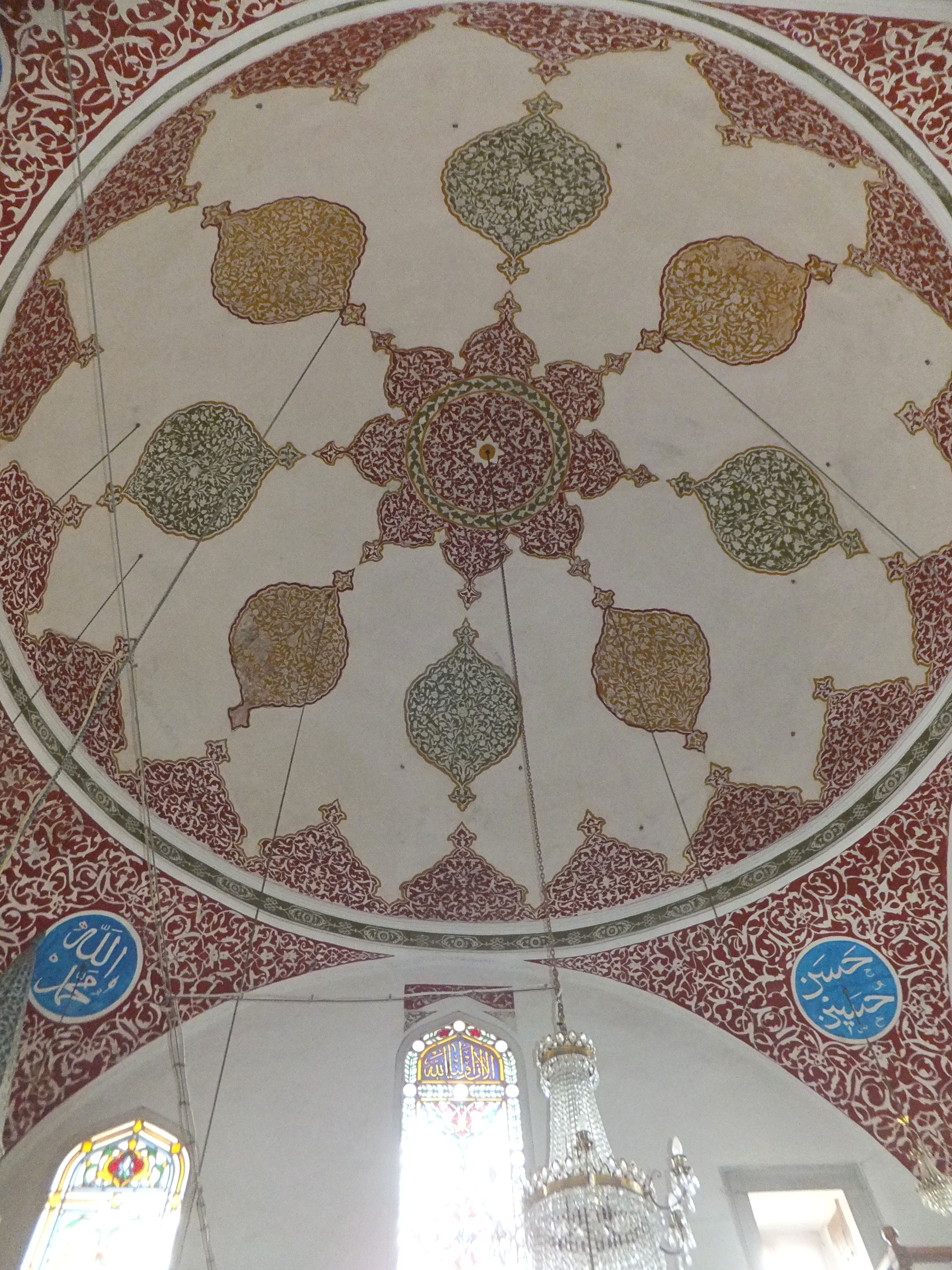
View of the dome

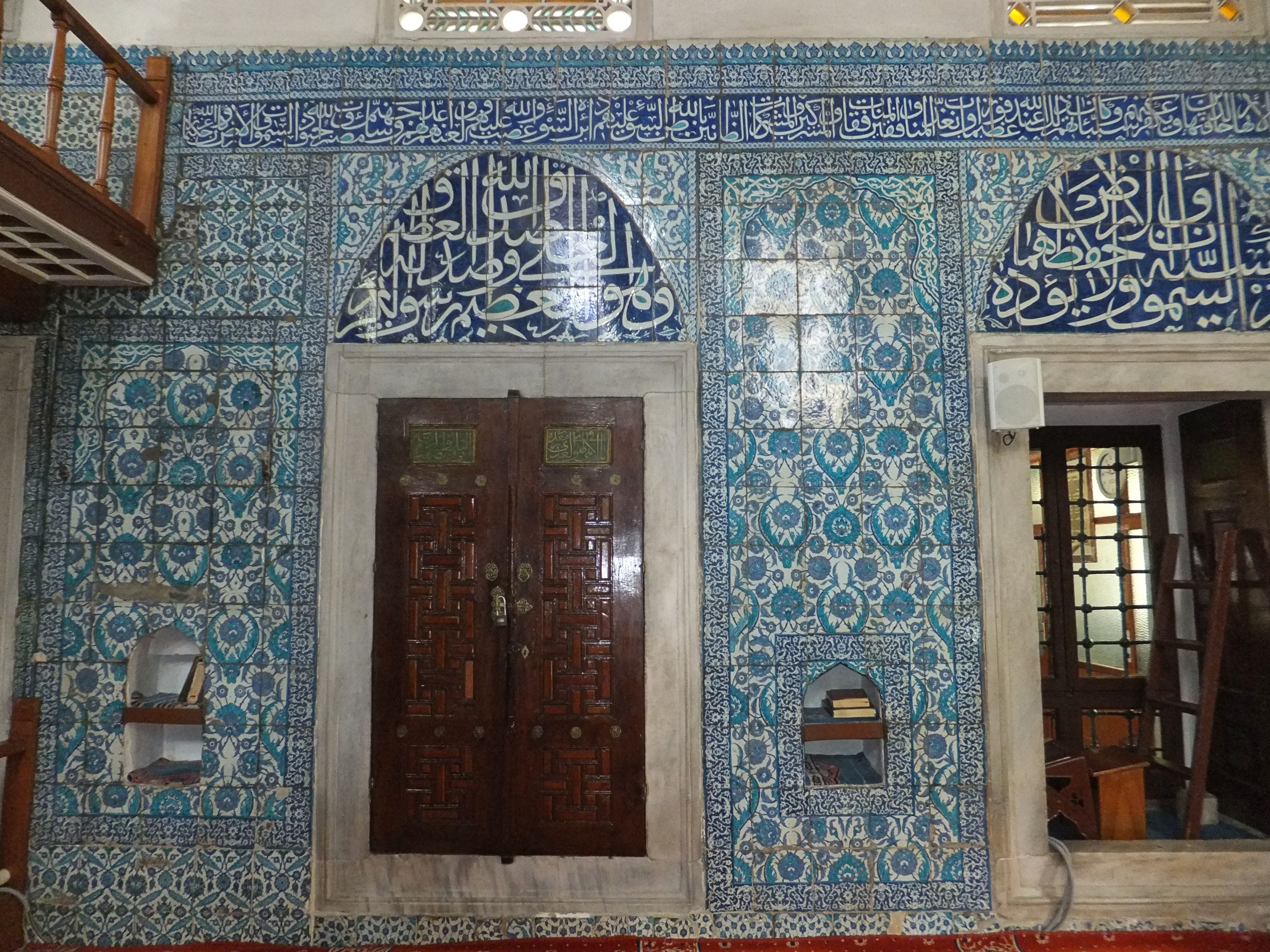
View of the tile decoration on the walls

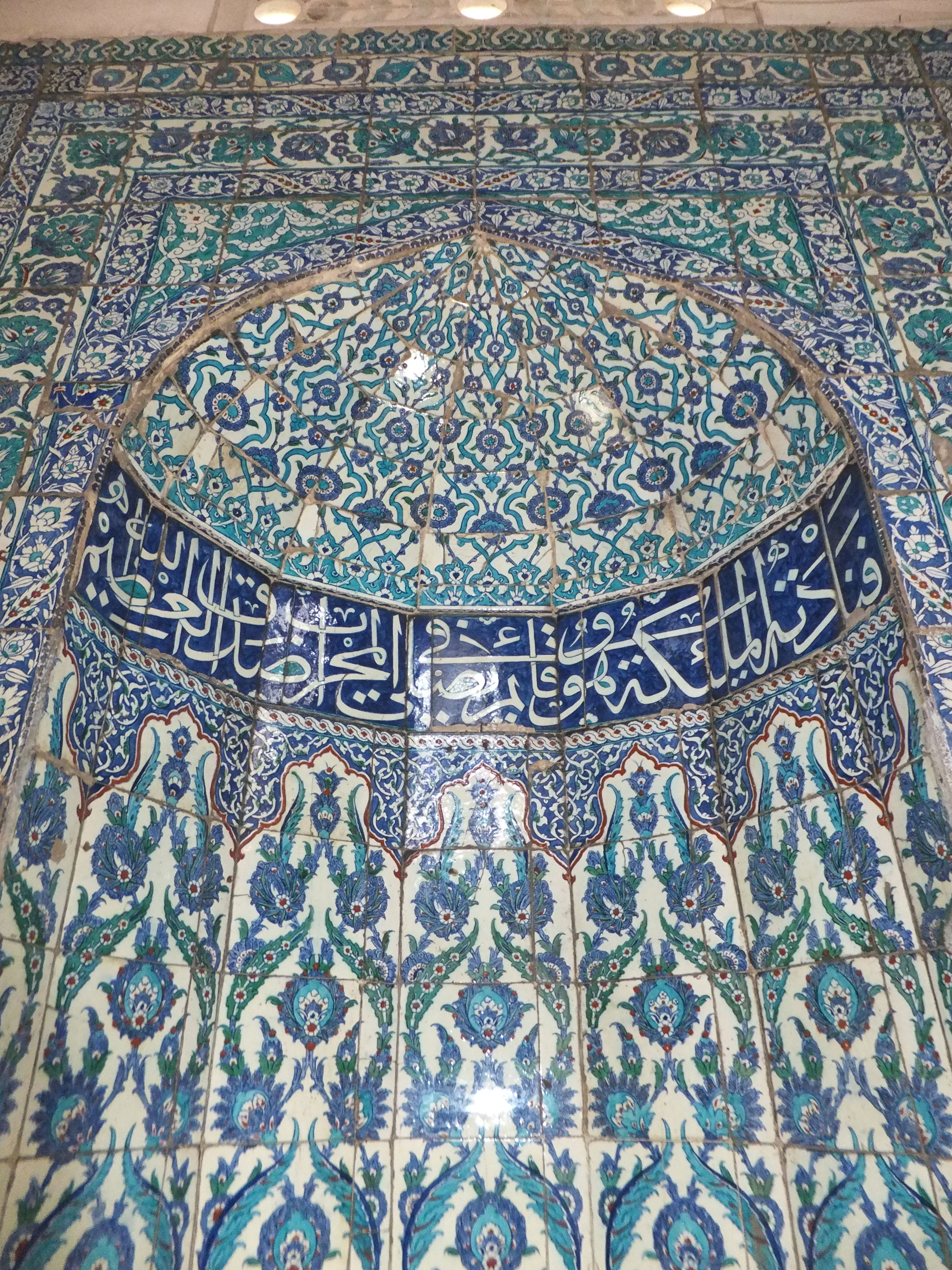
Closer view of the tiled mihrab

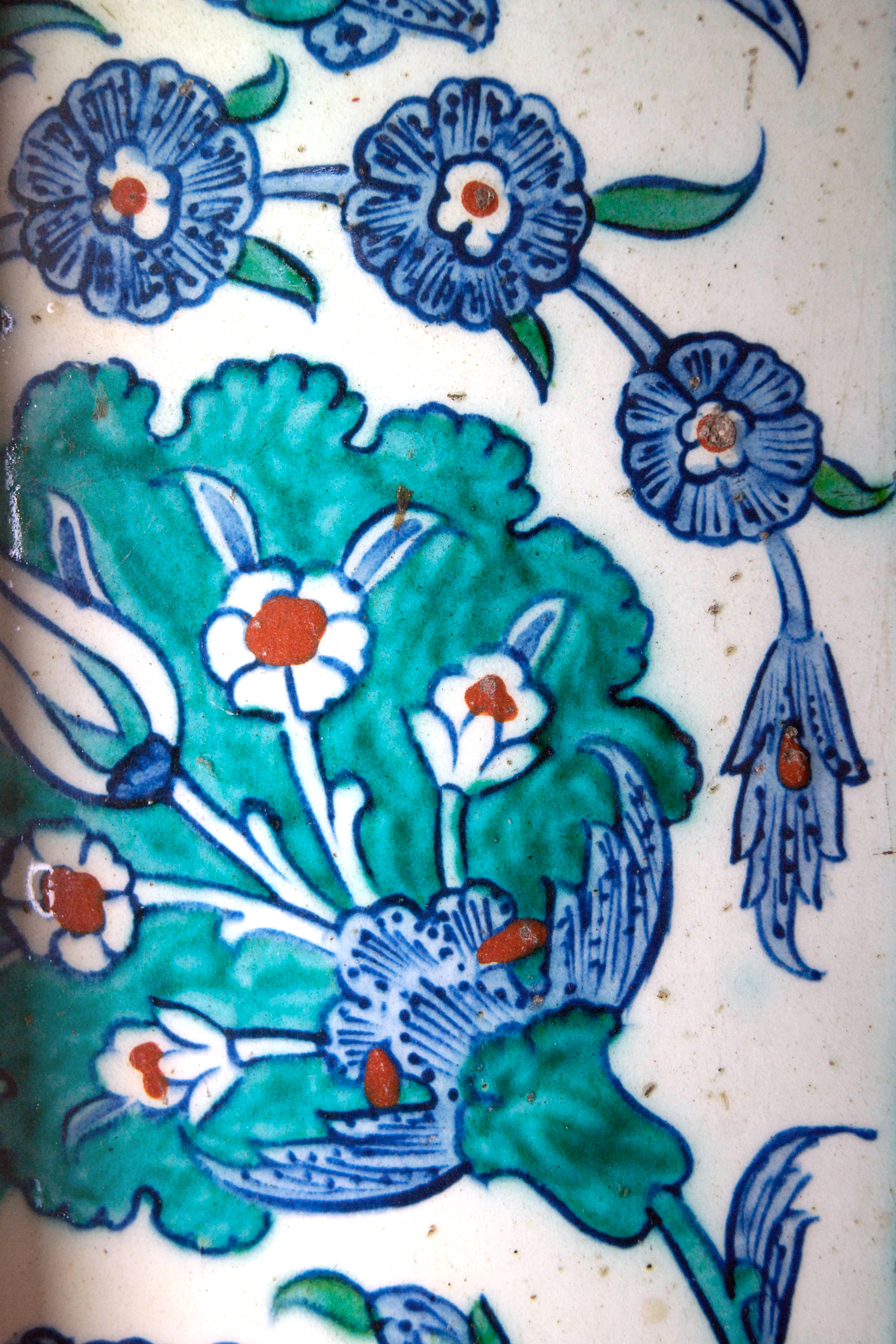
Detail on one of the tiles

In addition to the mosque, the surrounding complex (külliye) includes a fountain (shadirvan), a madrasa, a primary school (mektep), and a hammam. The fountain and the madrasa were built inside the walled precinct around the mosque. The fountain is covered by a large curved pointed roof. The madrasa is set into the northeast corner of the precinct and has an unusual triangular floor plan imposed by the limited space in this area. Located next to it and behind the qibla wall (southeast wall) of the mosque is a cistern. The primary school, a small domed structure, is located just outside the precinct walls. The hammam is a larger structure located slightly to the southwest. It is a "double" hammam, meaning it has a section for women and a section for men.

Other structures of the complex

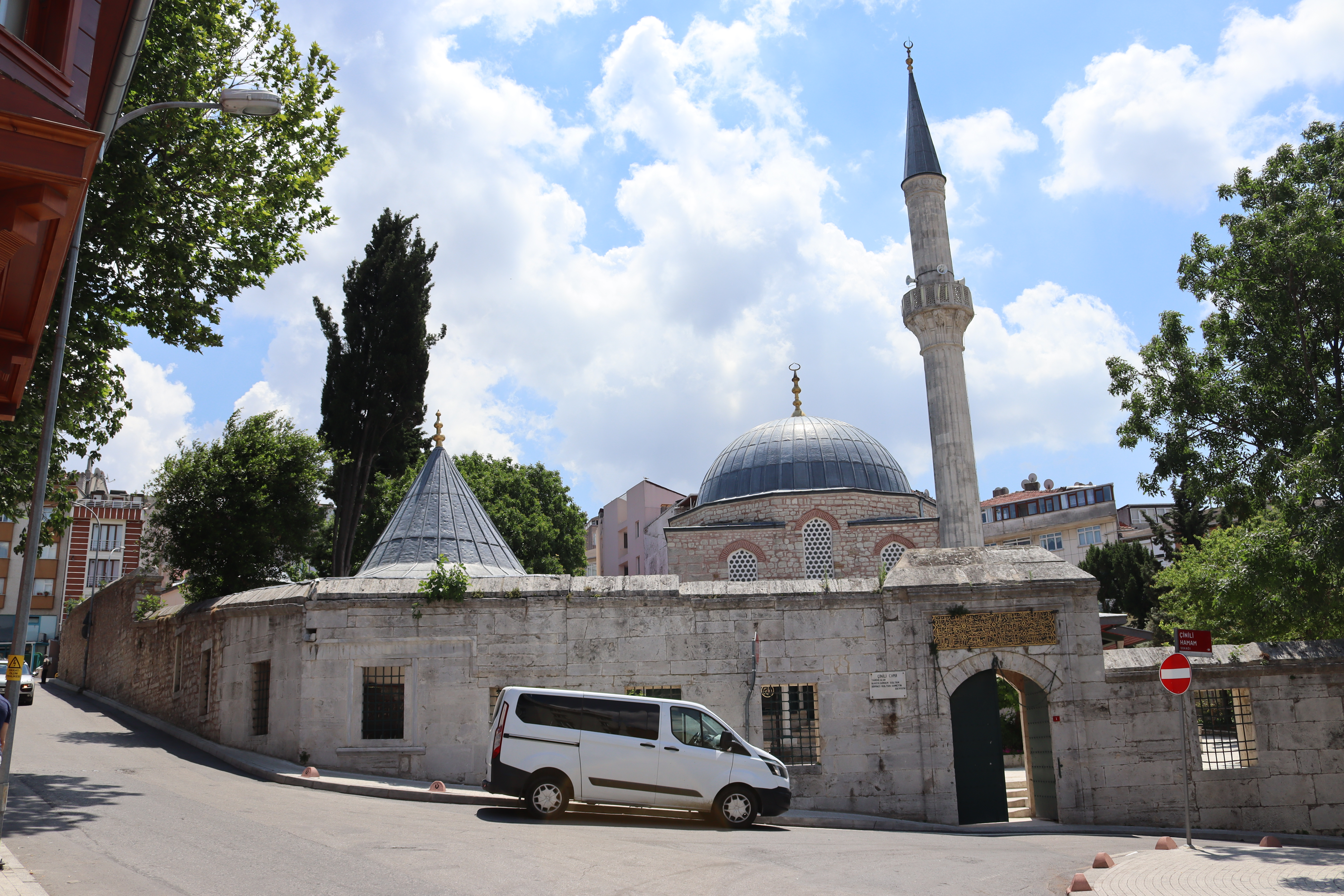
Exterior view of the mosque's walled outer precinct

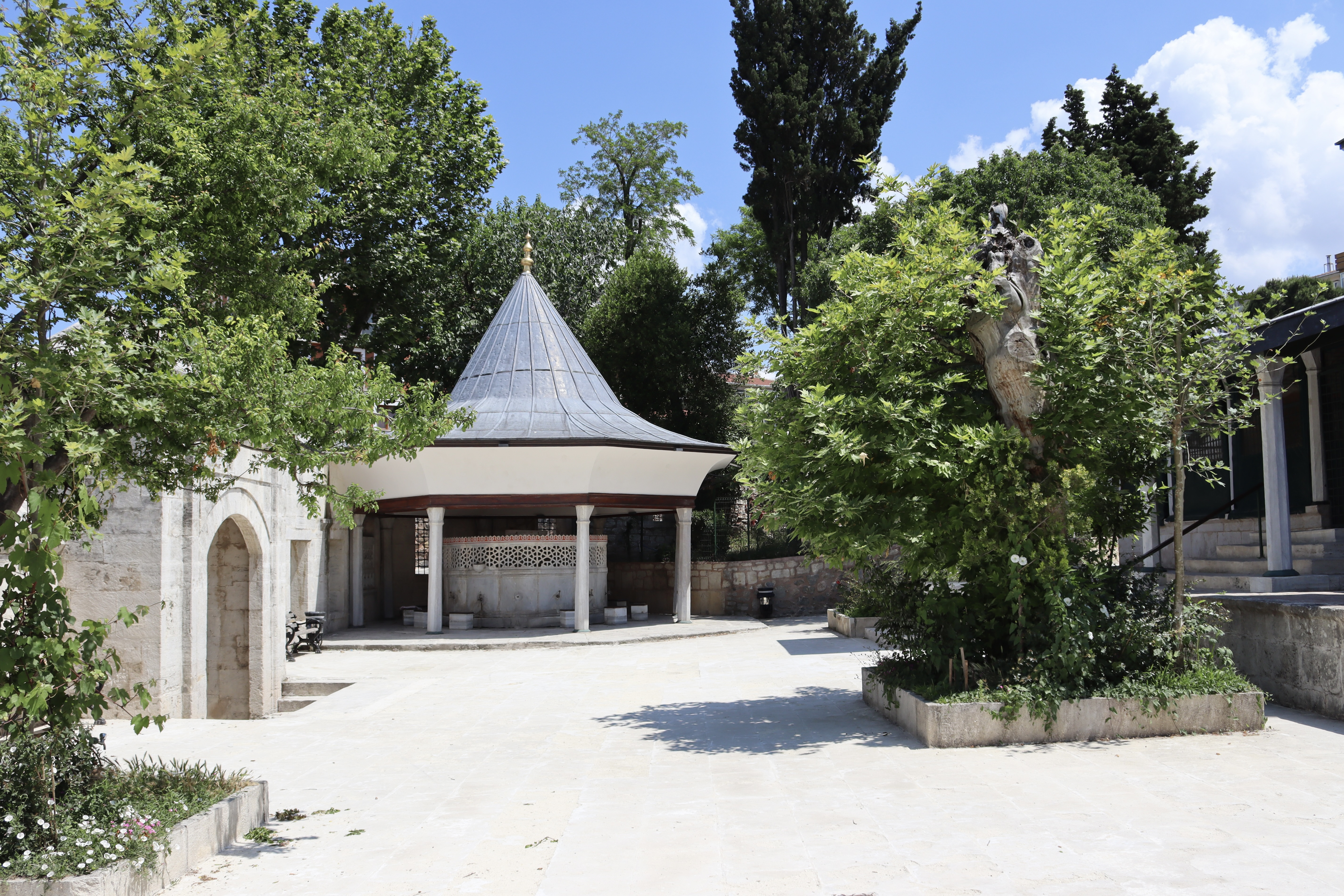
View inside the mosque's precinct, with the roofed fountain (shadirvan) visible in the center left

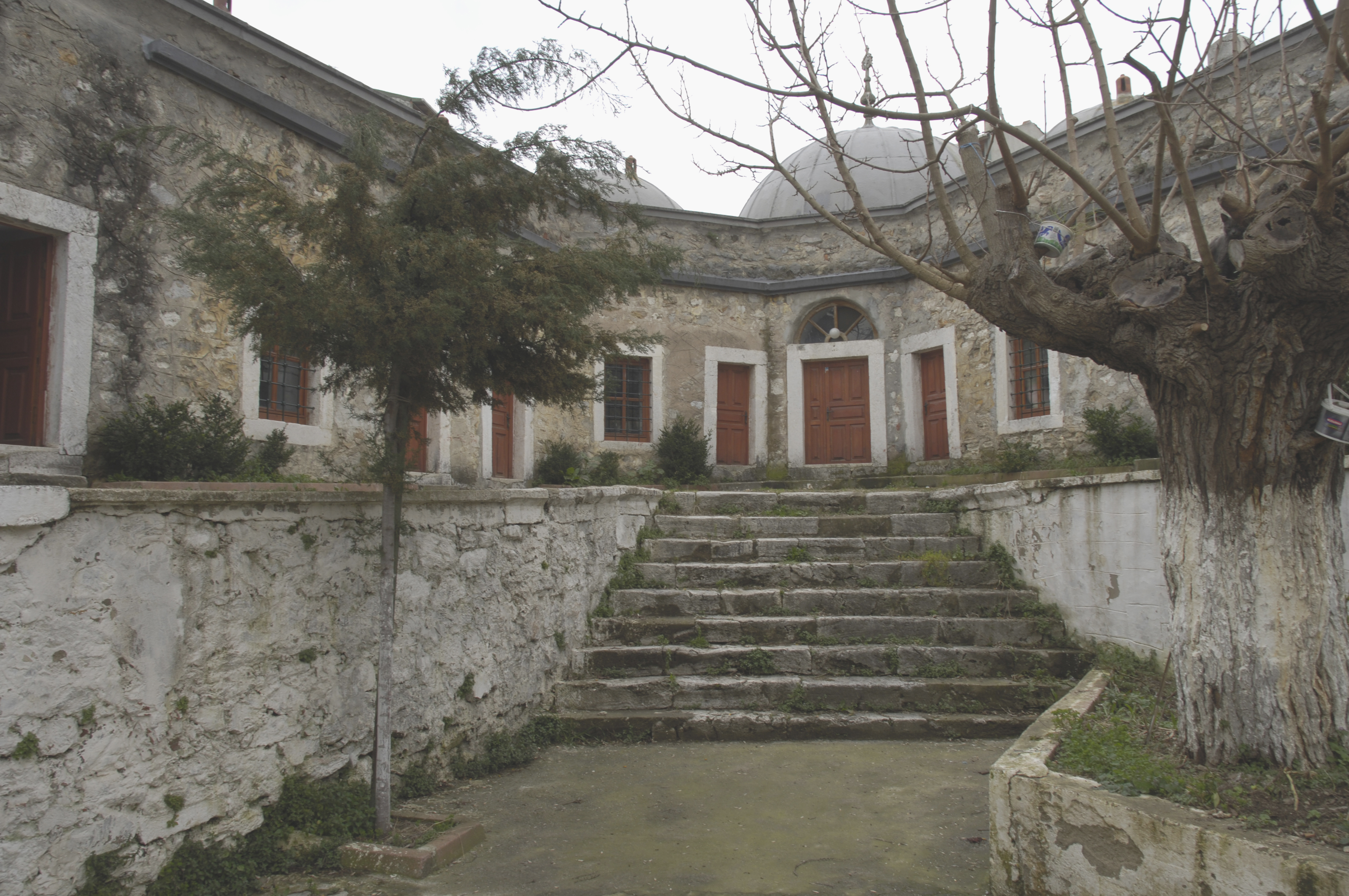
The madrasa of the complex (2006 photo, prior to recent restoration)

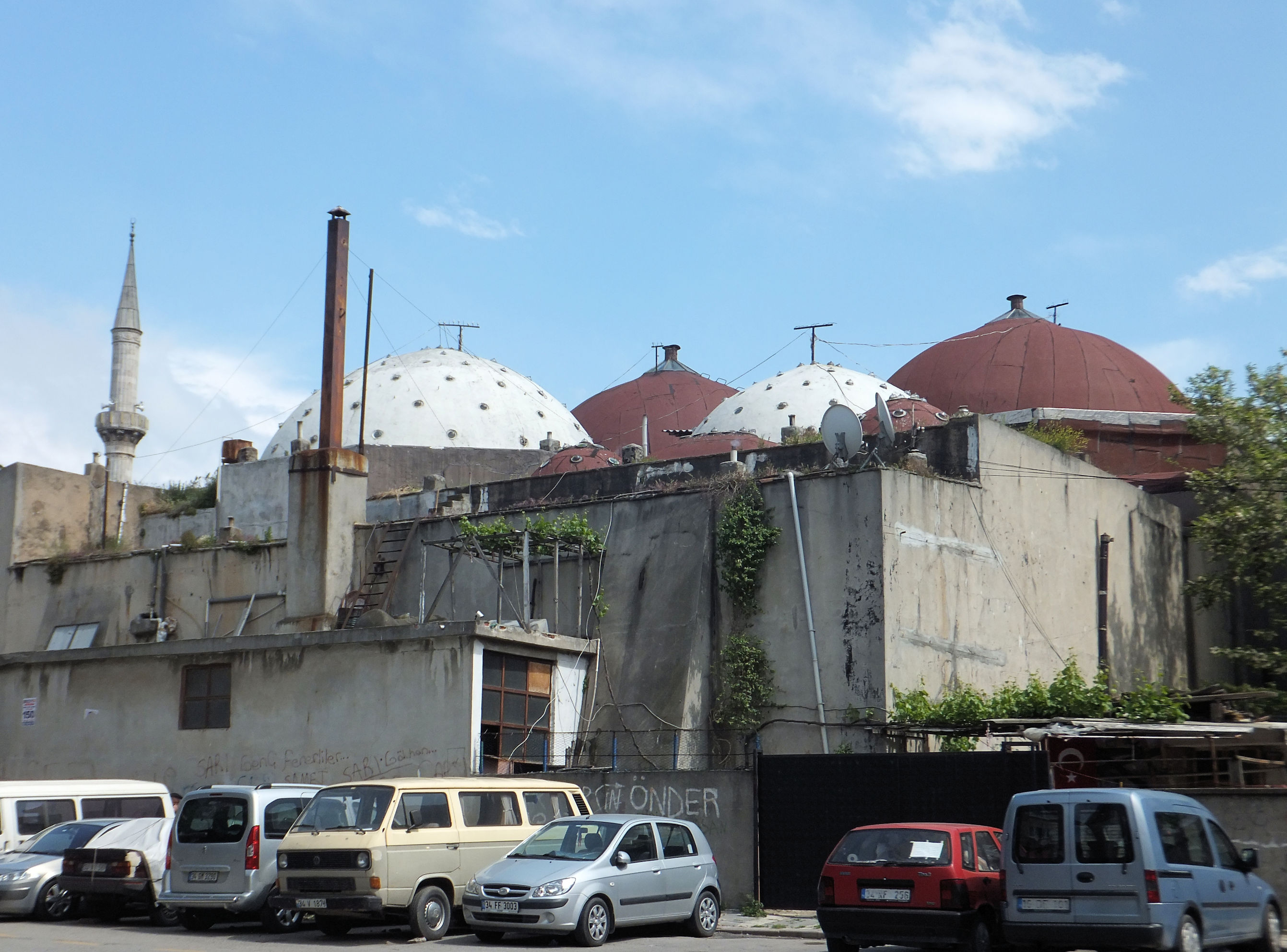
The hammam (bathhouse) of the complex, located near the mosque precinct

== See also ==
- Atik Valide Mosque
