= Edirne =

City in Edirne, Turkey

- Municipality
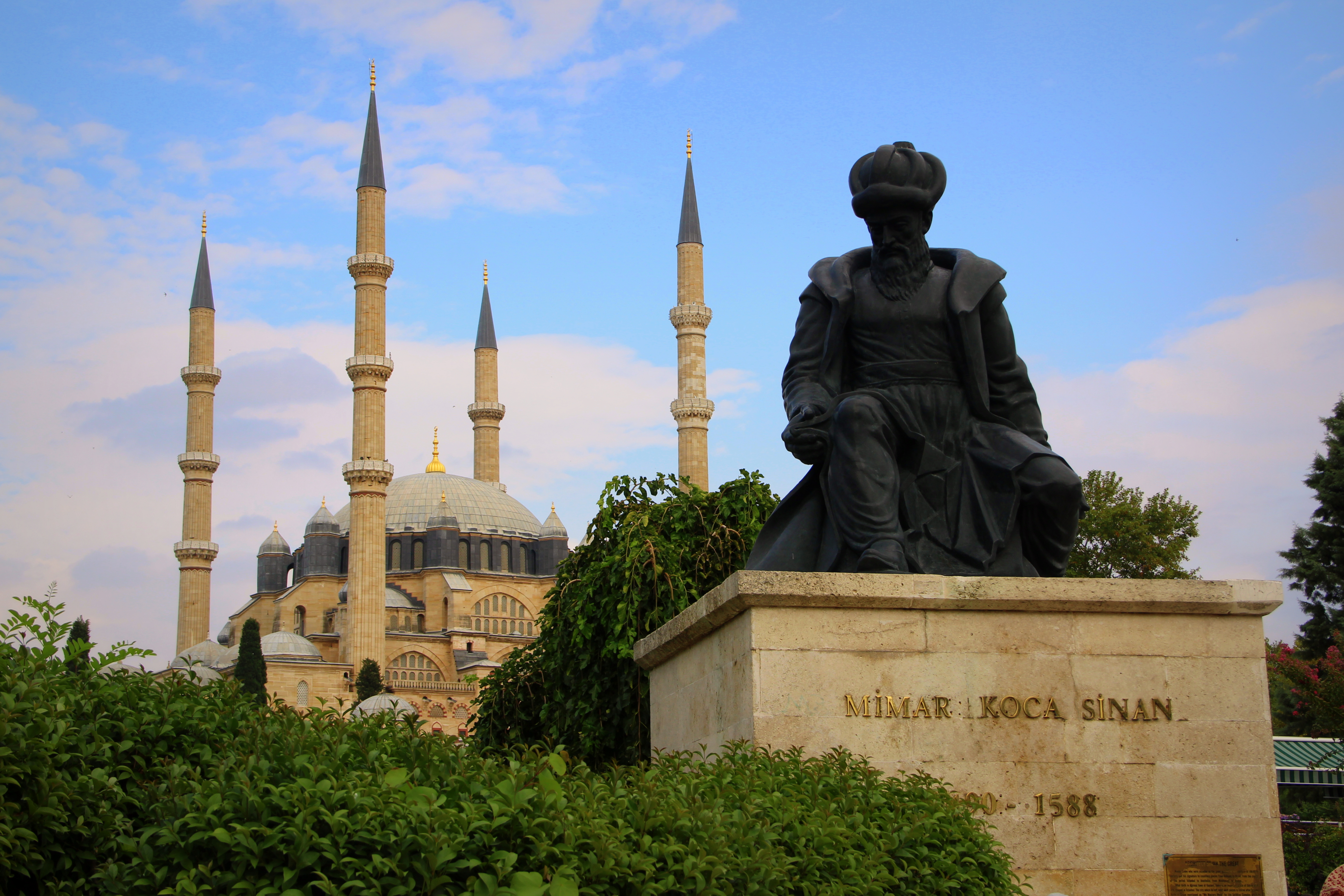
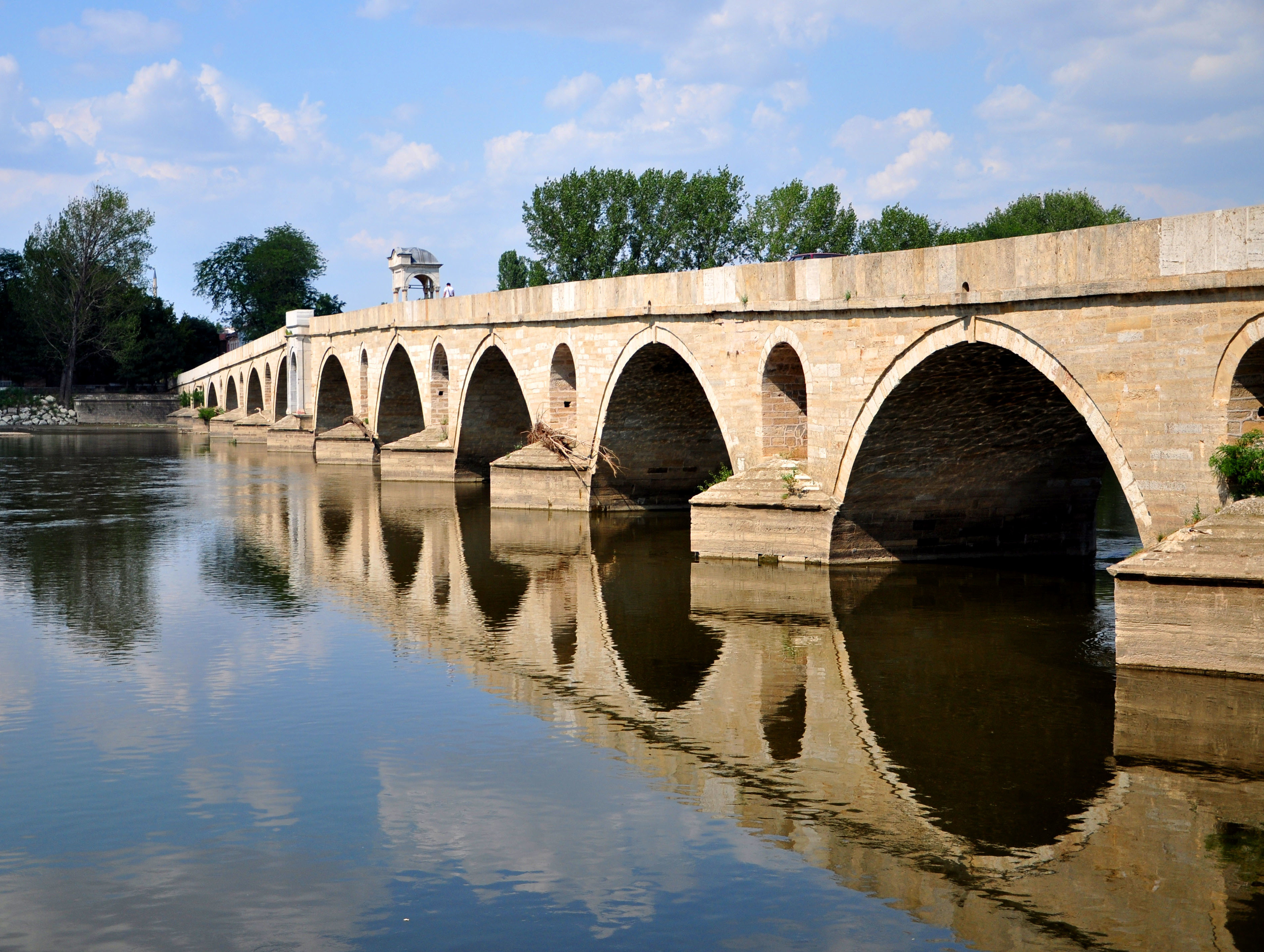
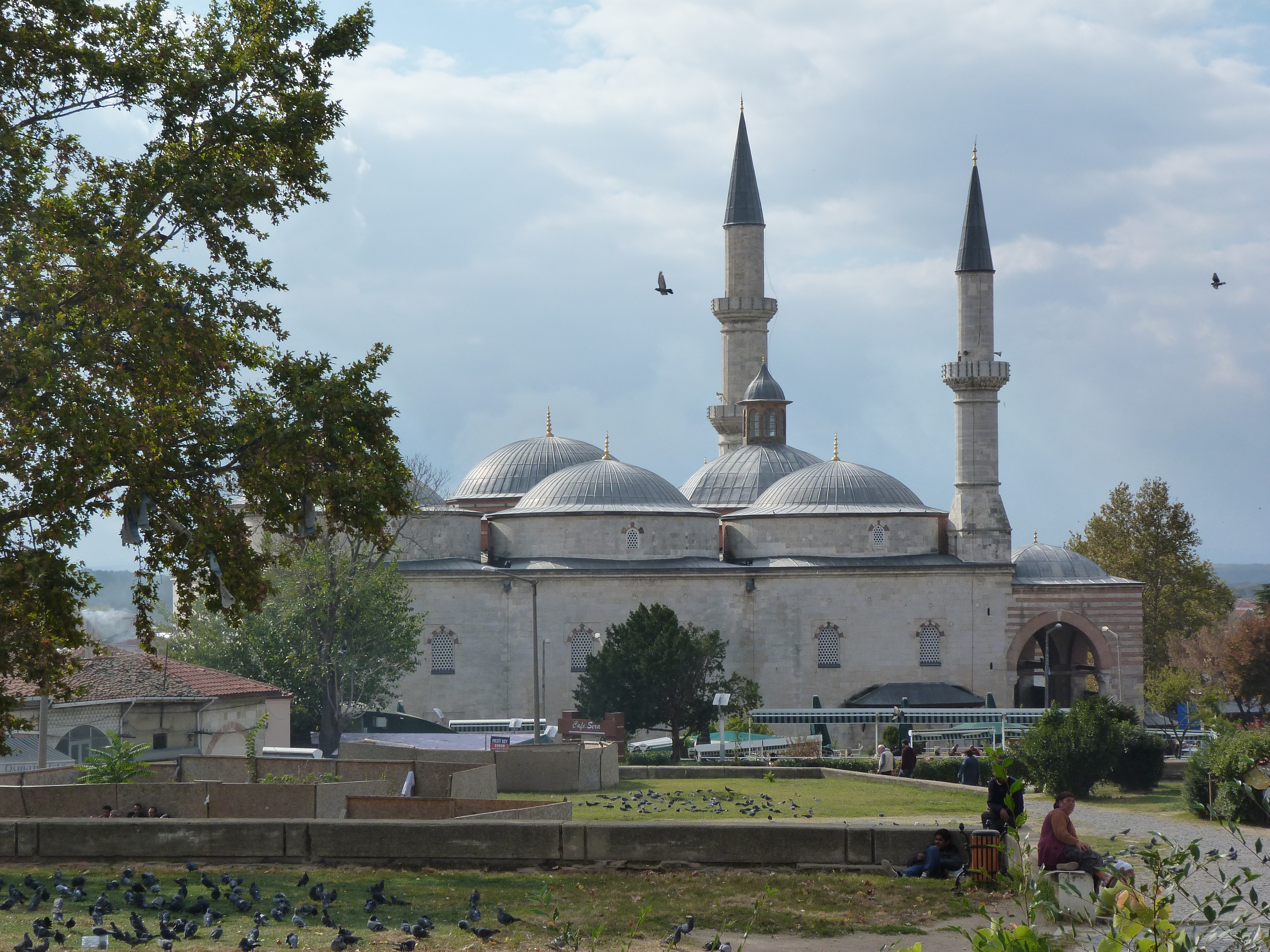
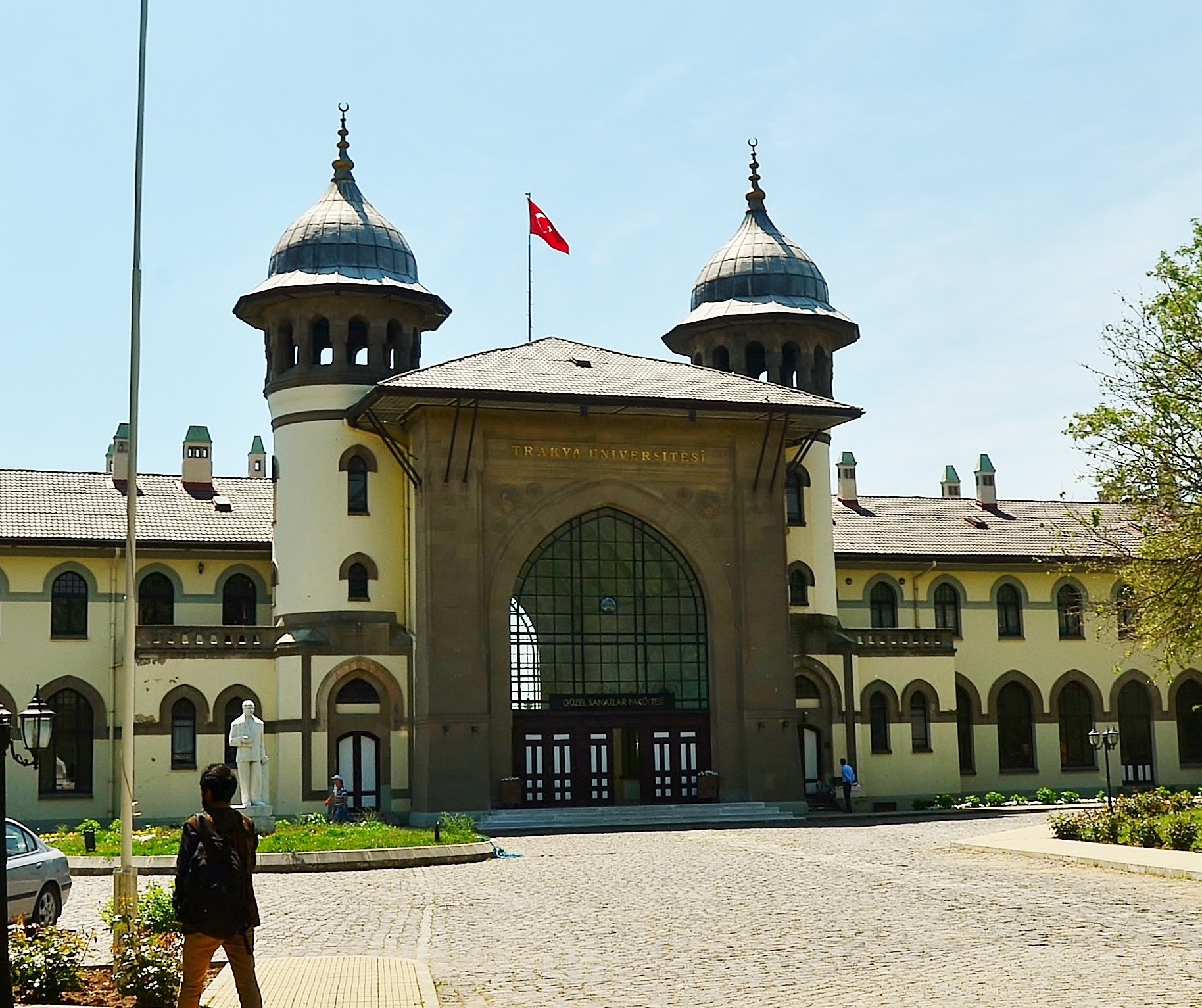
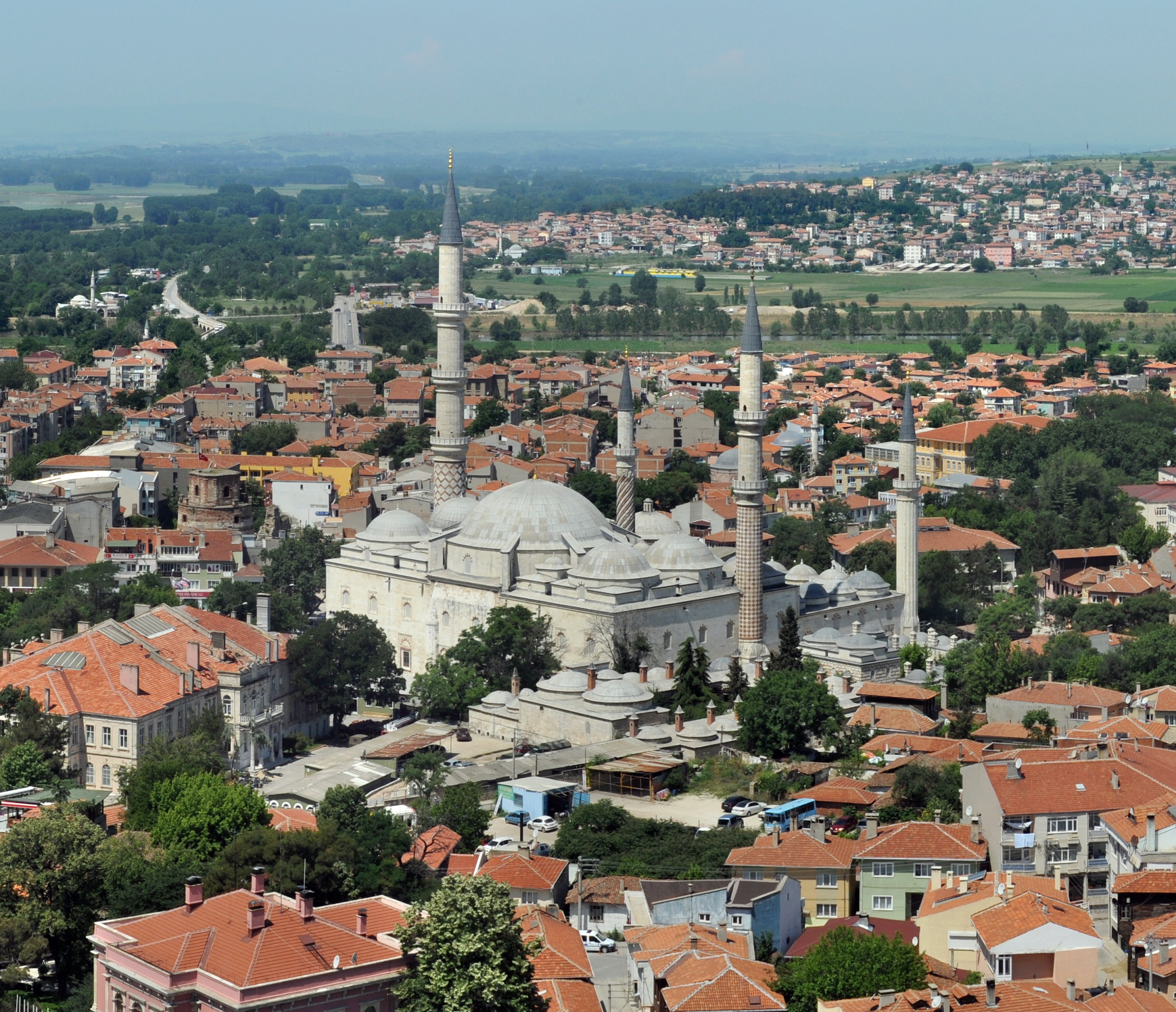
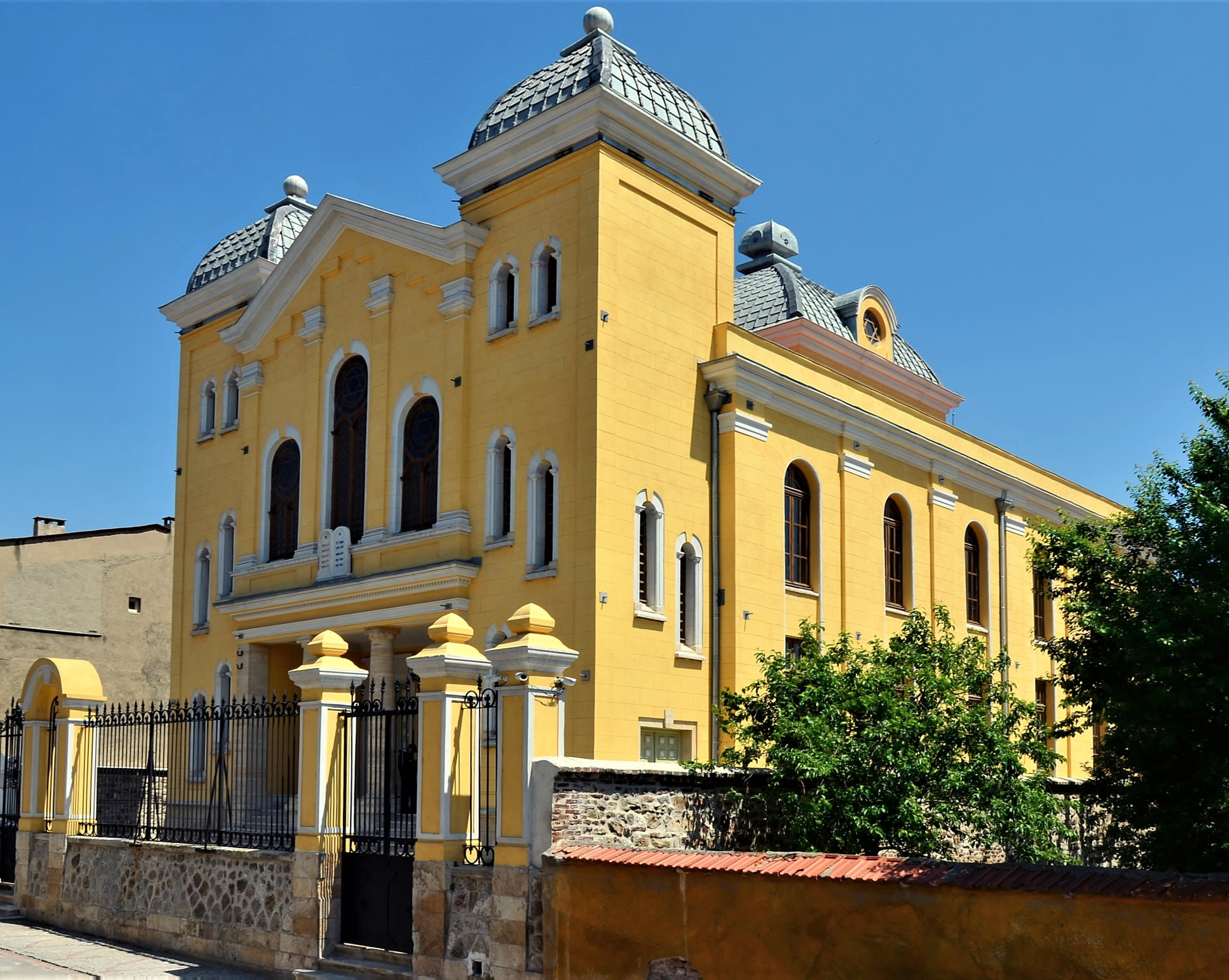
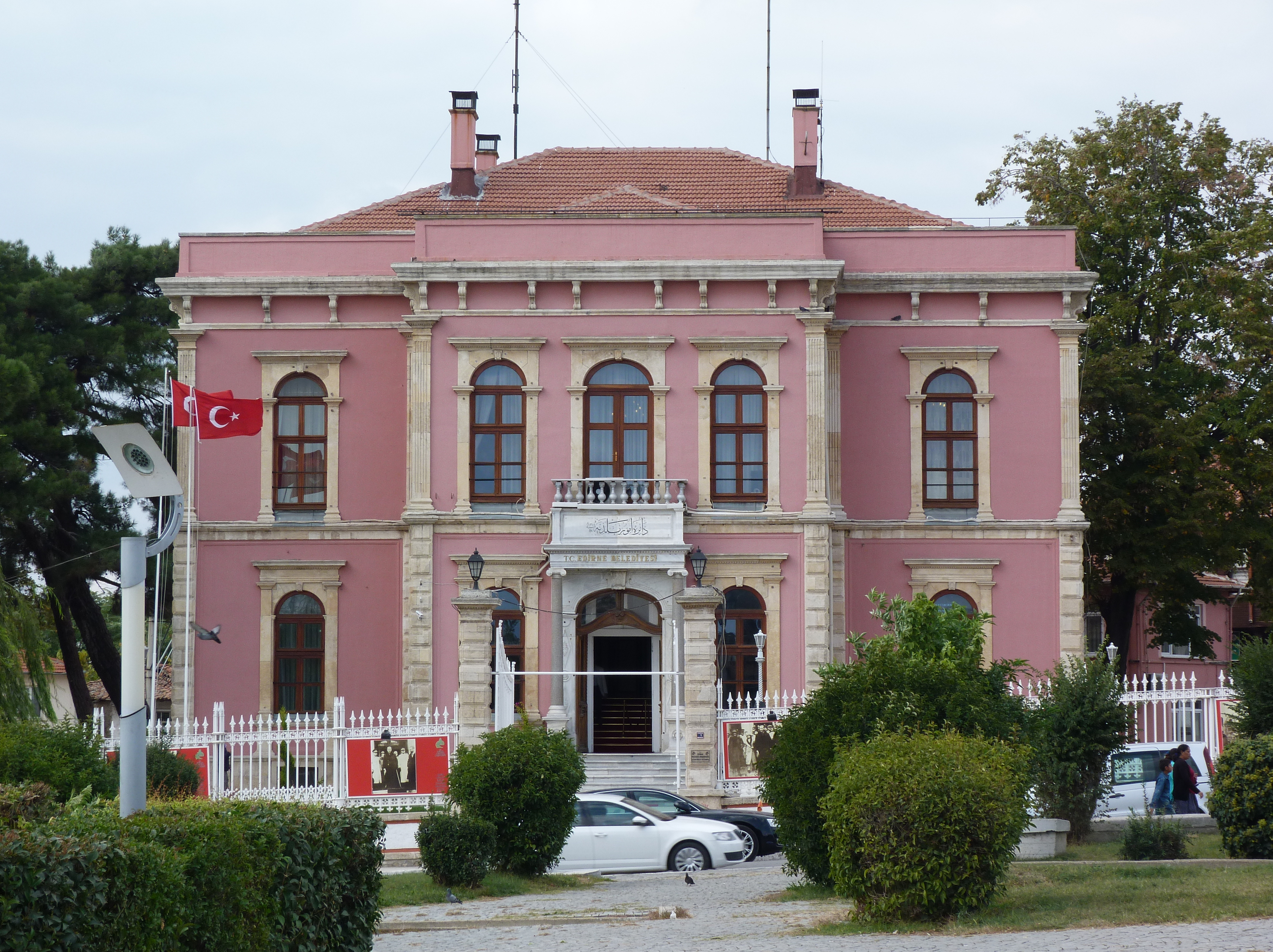
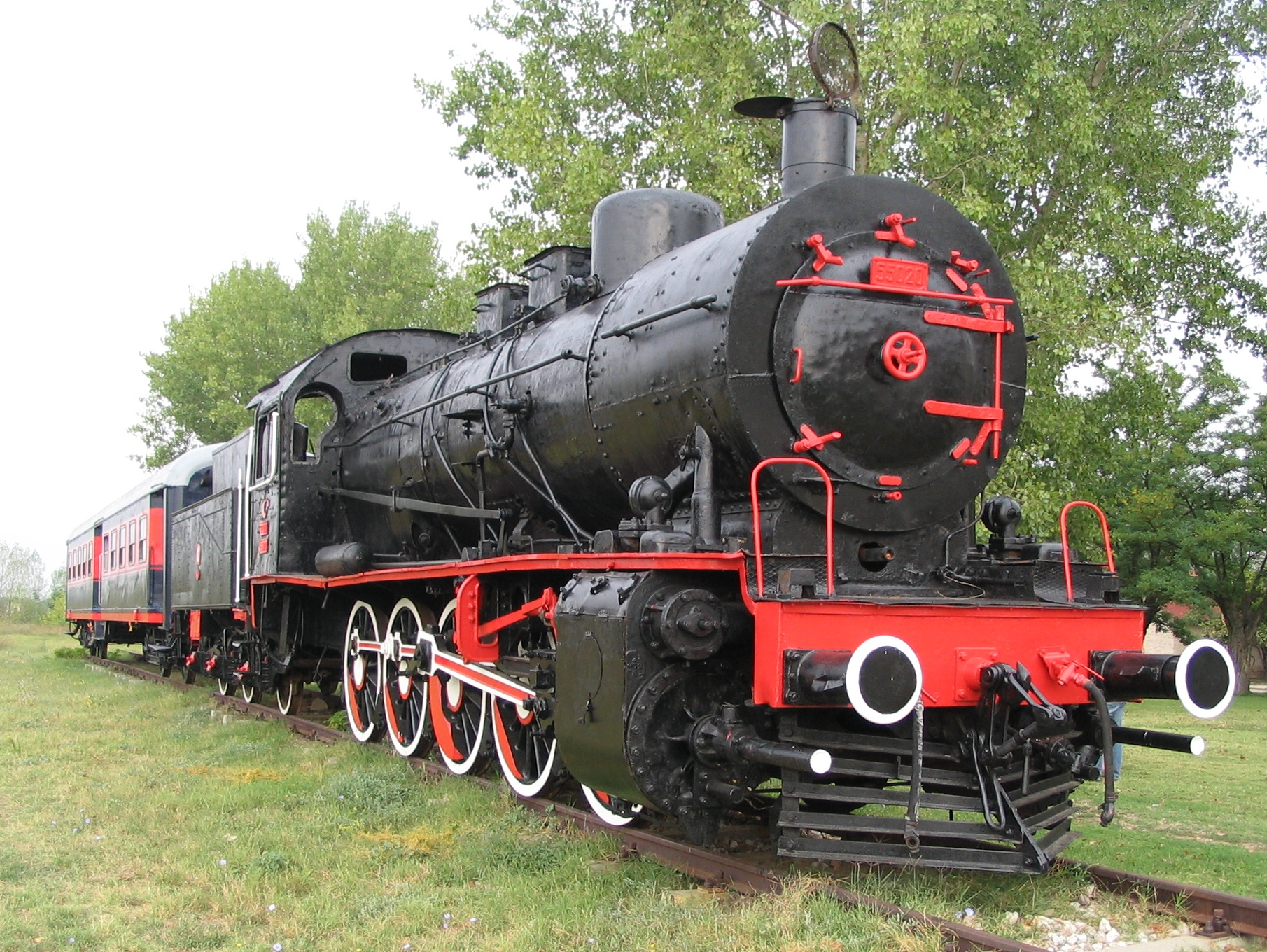
- From top down, left to right: Selimiye Mosque, Meriç Bridge, Old Mosque, Trakya University (formerly Karaağaç railway station), Üç Şerefeli Mosque, Grand Synagogue of Edirne, Town Hall, Historical Express

- Logo

- Location within Turkey Location within Marmara
- Coordinates: 41°40′37″N 26°33′20″E
- Country: Turkey
- Province: Edirne
- District: Edirne

Government
  - Mayor: Filiz Gencan (CHP)
- Elevation: 42 m (138 ft)
- Population (2022): 180,002
- Time zone: UTC+3 (TRT)
- Postal code: 22000
- Area code: 0284
- Website: www.edirne.bel.tr

Edirne (US: /eɪˈdɪərnə, ɛˈ-/; Turkish: [e.ˈdiɾ.ne]), historically known as Orestias, Orestiada, Adrianople, or Adriana, is a city in Turkey, in the northwestern part of the province of Edirne in Eastern Thrace. Situated 7 km (4.3 mi) from the Greek and 20 km (12 mi) from the Bulgarian borders, Edirne was the second capital city of the Ottoman Empire from the 1360s to 1453, (Note: İslâm Ansiklopedisi: "It is disputed when the Ottomans conquered this place; Various dates have been put forward in this regard, such as 1361, 1362, 1367 and 1369. Among these, the opinion that Edirne was captured in 1361 as a result of a systematic conquest policy by Murad and Lala Şahin, while Orhan Gazi was still alive, gains prominence. However, it has also been stated that the date of conquest may have occurred after 1366 (1369), based on an elegy showing that the city metropolitan Polykarpos was in Edirne in this capacity until 1366.) before Constantinople became its capital.

The city is a commercial centre for woven textiles, silks, carpets and agricultural products and has a growing tourism industry. It is the seat of Edirne Province and Edirne District. Its population is 180,002 (2022).

== Names and etymology ==
The city was founded by and named after the Roman emperor Hadrian as Hadrianopolis (Adrianople in English, /ˌeɪdriəˈnoʊpəl/; Ἁδριανούπολις in Greek) on the site of the Greek city of Orestias, which was itself founded on an earlier Thracian settlement named Uskudama. The Ottoman name Edrine (ادرنه) is derived from the Greek name. The name Adrianople was used in English until the Turkish adoption of the Latin alphabet in 1928, after which Edirne became the internationally recognised name. In Bulgarian the city is known as Одрин (Odrin).

== History ==
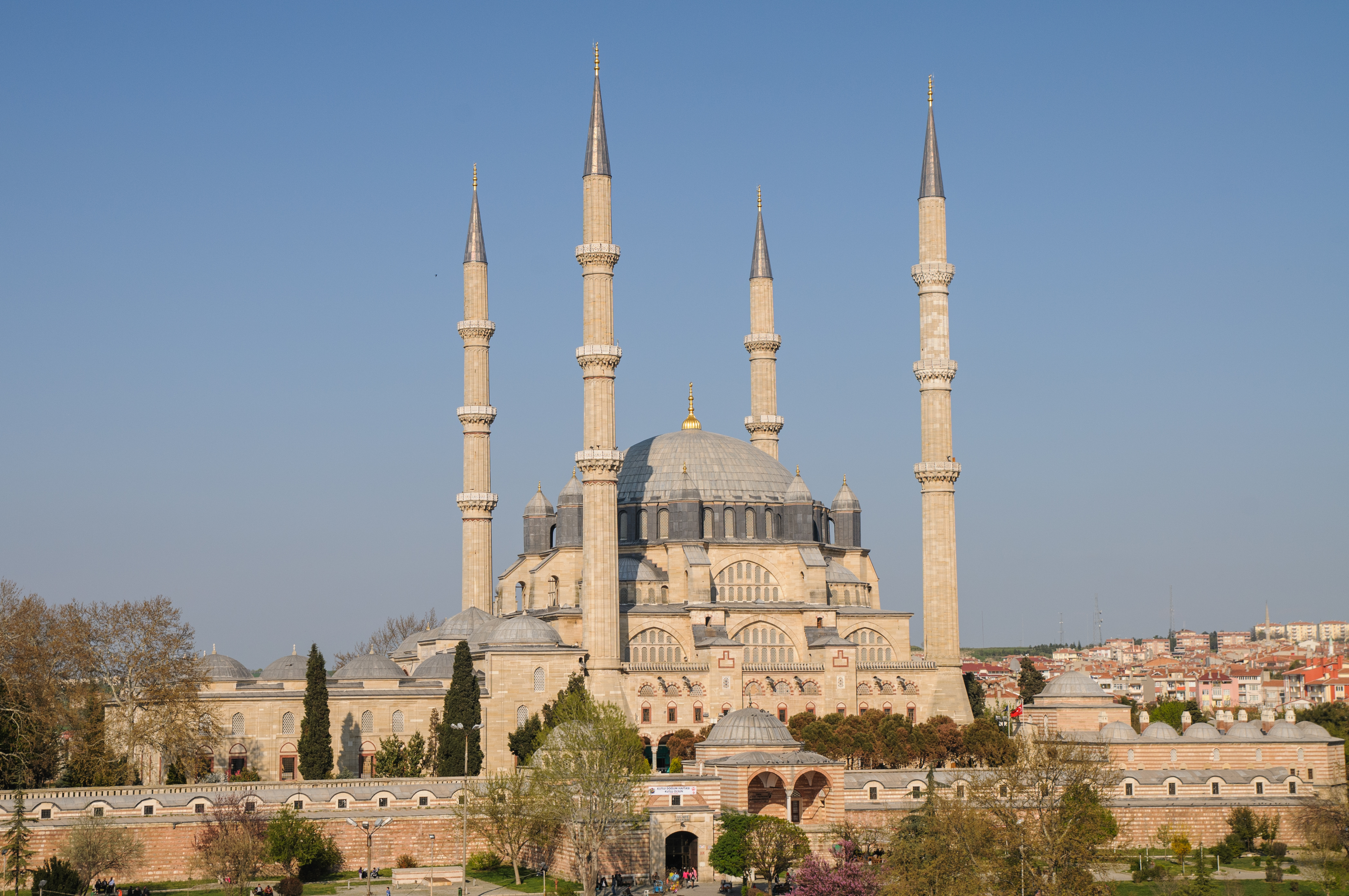
The Selimiye Mosque exterior after restoration. Architect Sinan called the Şehzade Mosque in Istanbul his apprentice work, the Süleymaniye his journeyman work, and the Selimiye his masterpiece. He was 85 when he finished it.

The area around Edirne has been the site of numerous major battles and sieges starting from the days of the Roman Empire. The vagaries of the border region between Asia and Europe gave rise to Edirne's claim to be the most frequently contested spot on earth.

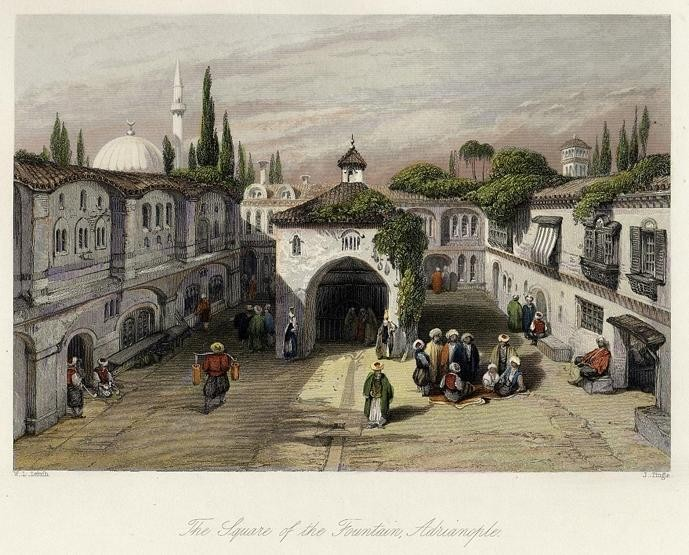
The Square of the Fountain, Adrianople, 1839

=== Roman and Byzantine period ===
The city was reestablished by the Roman Emperor Hadrian on the site of Orestias (named after its mythological founder Orestes), which was itself built on a previous Thracian settlement known as Uskadama, Uskudama, Uskodama or Uscudama. Hadrian developed it, adorned it with monuments, and changed its name to Hadrianopolis (Anglicised as Adrianople). Licinius was defeated here by Constantine I in 324, and Emperor Valens was killed by the Goths here during the Battle of Adrianople in 378.

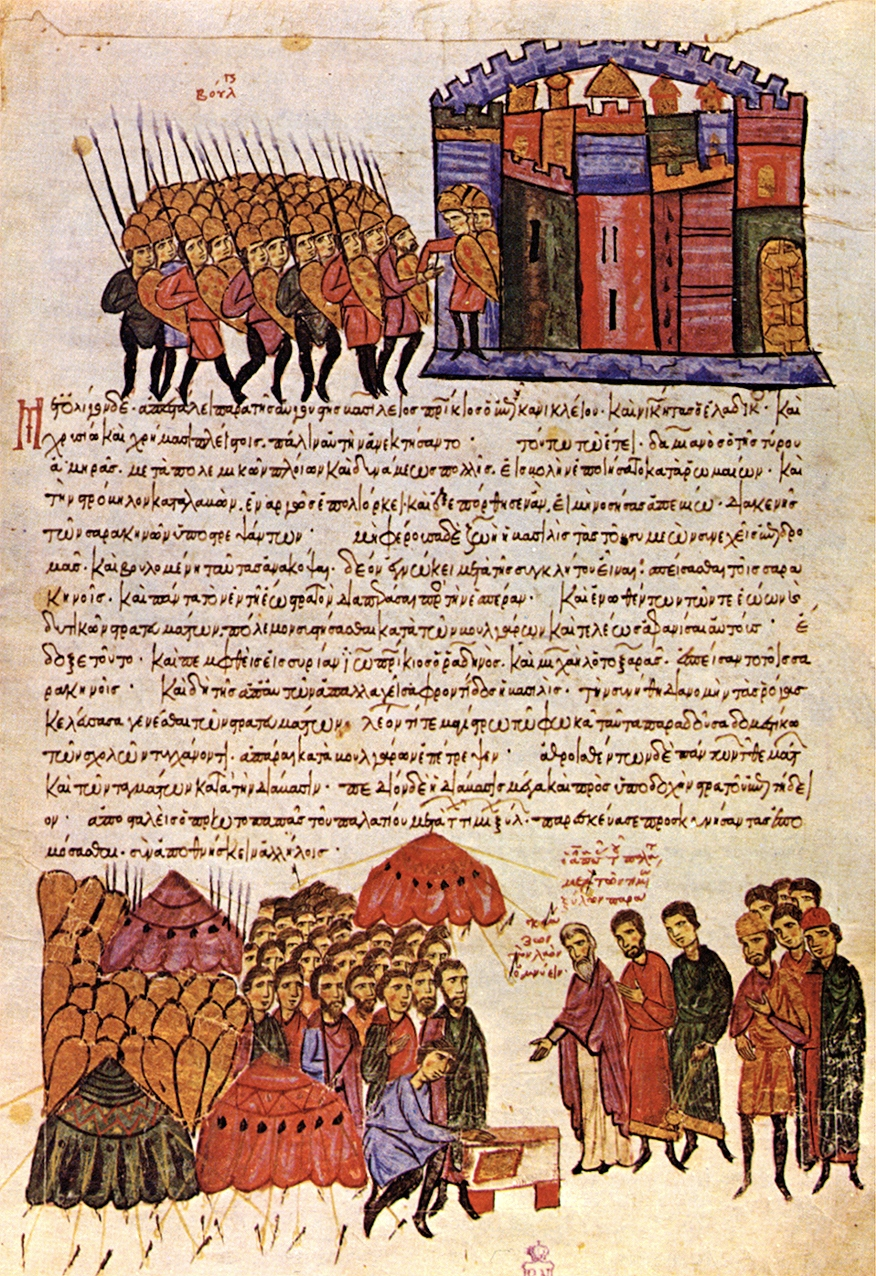
Simeon captured Adrianople and Byzantine soldiers before the Battle of Adrianople, by John Skylitzes.

During the period of the Latin Empire of Constantinople, the Crusaders were defeated by the Bulgarian Emperor Kaloyan at the Battle of Adrianople in 1205. In 1206 the Latin regime gave Adrianople and the surrounding area to the Byzantine aristocrat Theodore Branas as a hereditary fief. Theodore Komnenos, Despot of Epirus, took possession of it in 1227, but three years later was defeated at Klokotnitsa by Emperor Ivan Asen II of Bulgaria. In 1321, Andronikos III set up his base in Adrianople, initiating the First Palaiologan civil war against his grandfather, Emperor Andronikos II.

Ottoman period

The exact date of the Ottoman conquest of Adrianople is disputed. While some sources place the conquest in 1361 or 1362, other historians argue that the city likely fell later in the decade during the reign of Sultan Murad I. Due to its strategic position at the junction of major Balkan land and river trade routes, Adrianople had long served as an important regional center during the Byzantine period, and these geographic and commercial advantages contributed significantly to its importance as an early Ottoman capital. The city became "Edirne" in Turkish, reflecting the Turkish pronunciation and Murad moved the Ottoman capital here from Bursa. Mehmed the Conqueror (Sultan Mehmed II) was born in Adrianople, where he came under the influence of Hurufis dismissed by Taşköprüzade in the Şakaiki Numaniye as 'certain accursed ones of no significance', who were burnt as heretics by Mahmud Pasha.

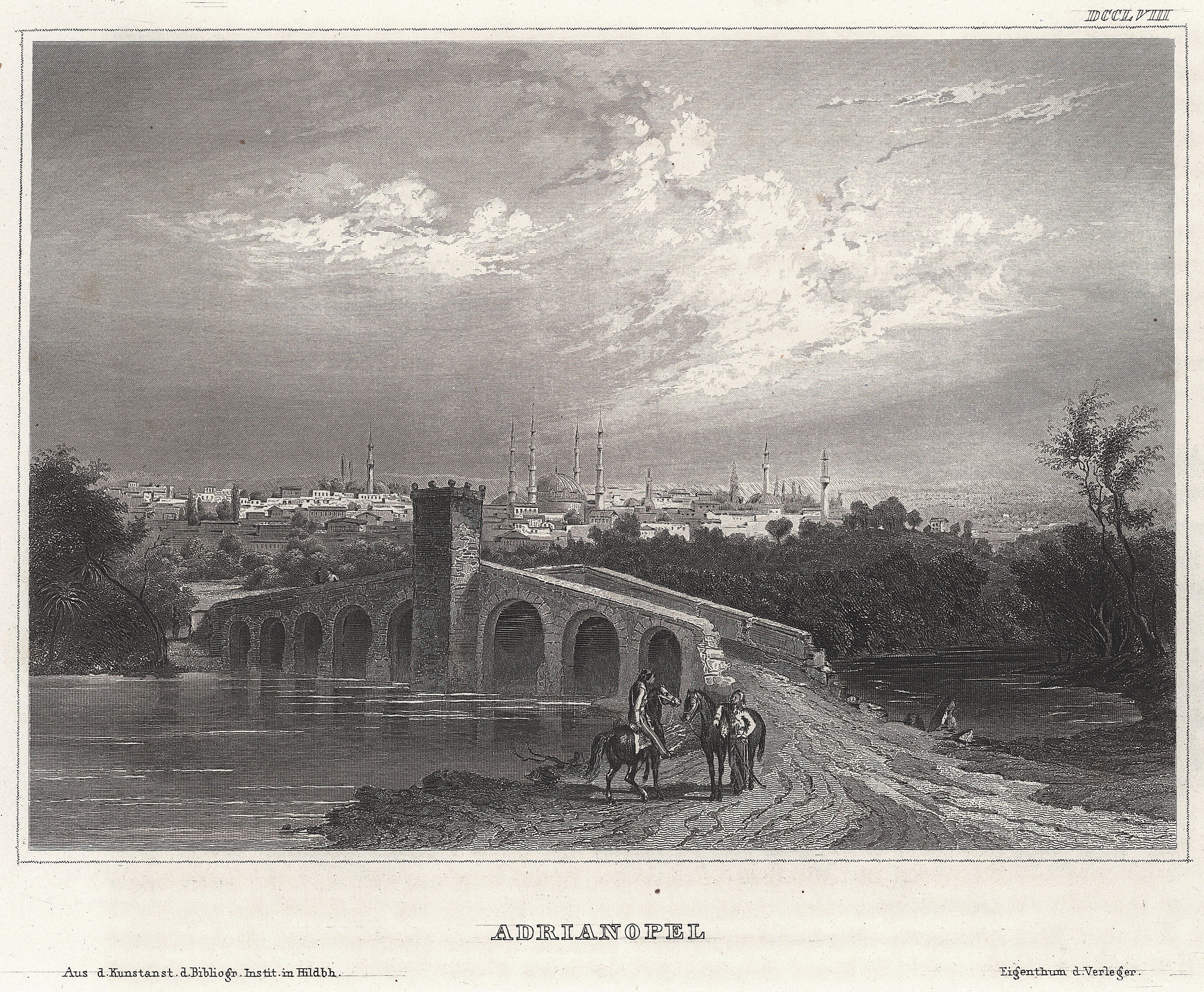
An artist's illustration of Adrianople in 1857

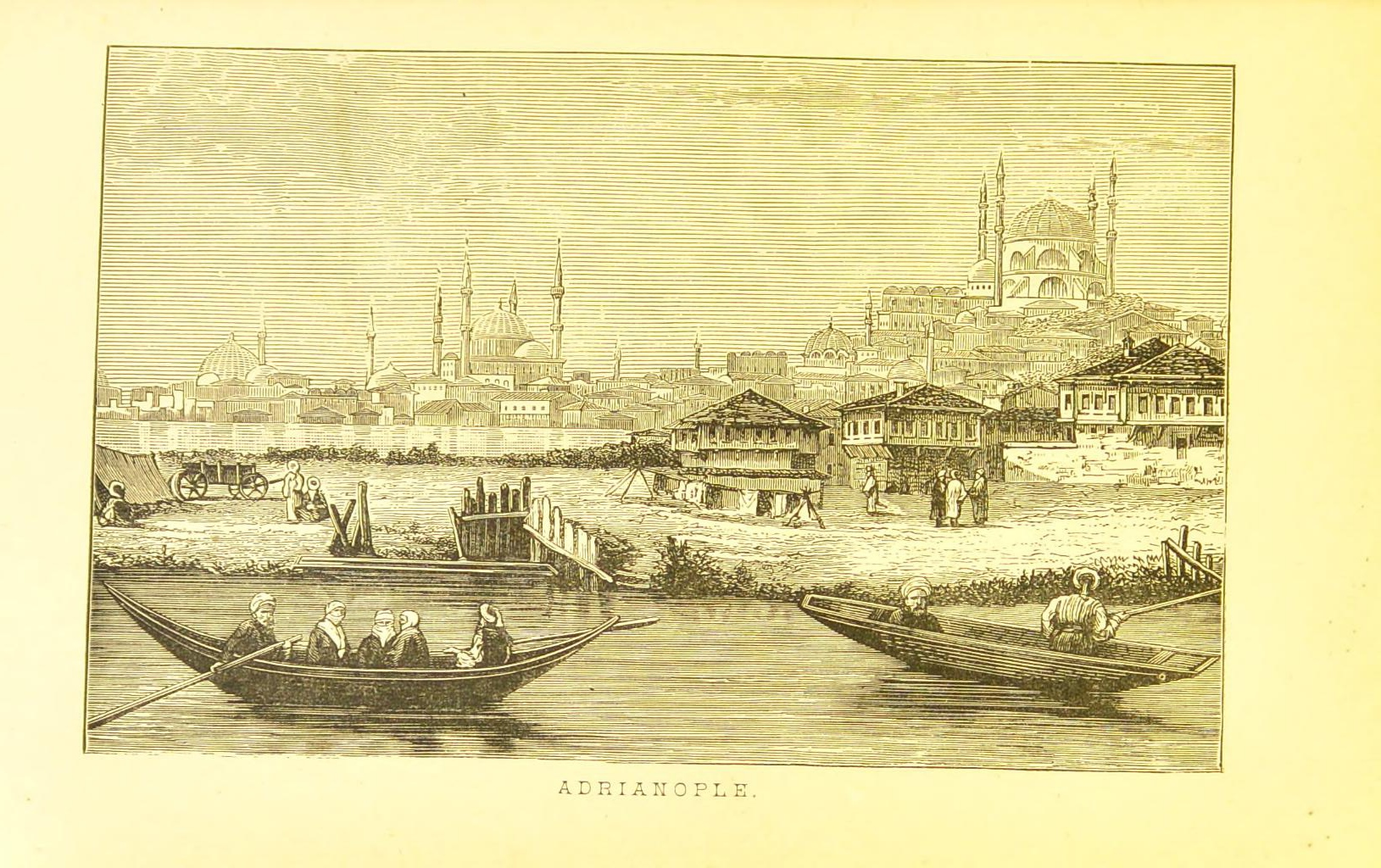
Under the Red Crescent: Or, Ambulance Adventures in the Russo-Turkish War of 1877-1878.

The city remained the seat of Ottoman power until 1453, when Mehmed II took Constantinople (present-day Istanbul) and moved the capital there. The importance of Edirne to the early Ottomans explains the plethora of early Ottoman mosques, medreses and other monuments that have survived until today although the Eski Sarayı (Old Palace) was largely destroyed, leaving only relatively slight remains. Also, there is evidence of a scriptorium in the Ottoman's Edirne palace during this period.

Uzunköprü Bridge, the world's longest medieval stone bridge, connects Anatolia with the Balkans on the Ergene River and was erected between 1426 and 1443 by the primary architect, Müslihiddin, during the reign of Ottoman Sultan Murat II.

That Adrianople/Edirne continued to hold an important place in Ottoman hearts is reflected in the fact that Sultan Mehmed IV left the Topkapı Palace in Constantinople to die here in 1693.

The wife of the British ambassador to the Ottoman Empire, Lady Mary Wortley Montagu, spent six weeks in Edirne (then Adrianople) in the spring of 1717 and left an account of her experiences there in her The Turkish Embassy Letters. Wearing Turkish dress, Montagu witnessed the passage of Sultan Ahmed III to the mosque, visited the young wife-to-be of his vizier, Damad Ibrahim Pasha and was shown around the Selimiye Mosque.

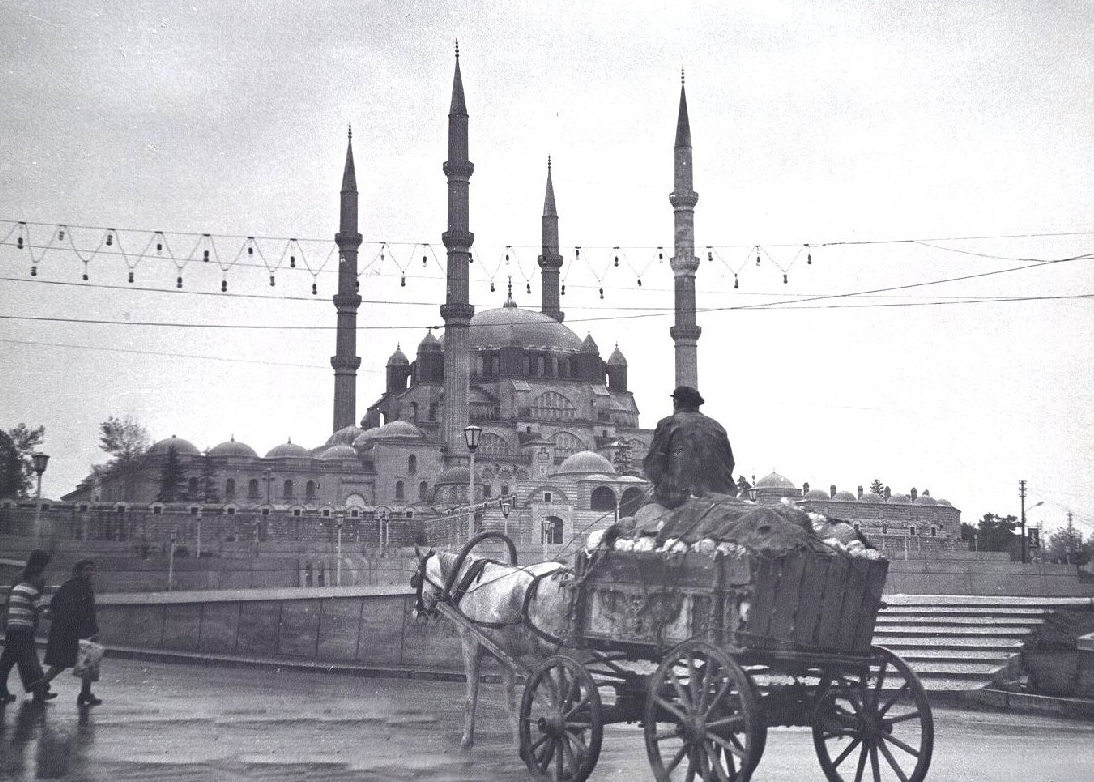
Selimiye Mosque in Edirne in the first quarter of the 20th century.

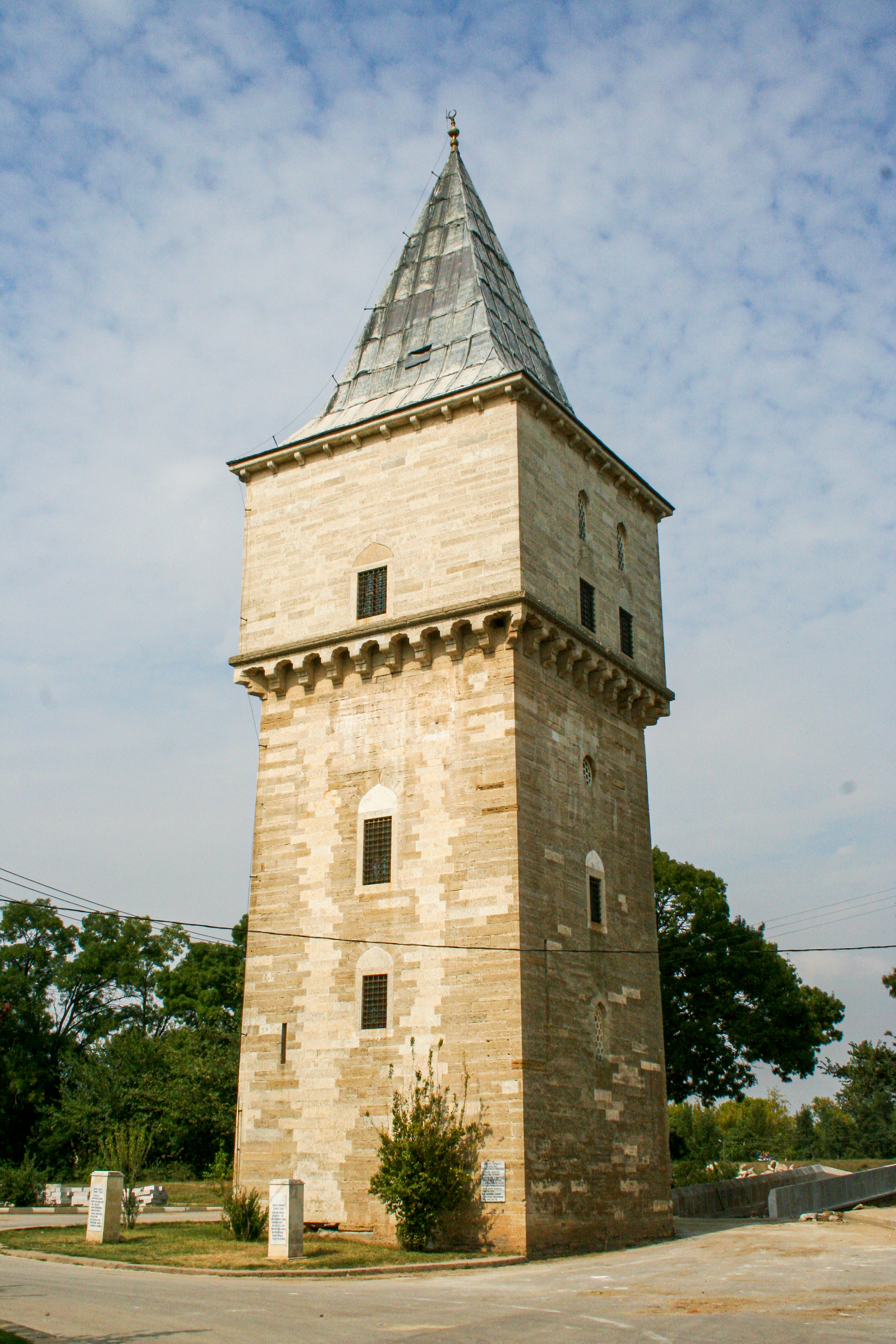
Adalet Tower part of Edirne Palace Complex.

Adrianople was briefly occupied by imperial Russian troops in 1829 during the Greek War of Independence and in 1878 during the Russo-Turkish War of 1877–1878. The city suffered a fire in 1905. At that time it had about 80,000 inhabitants, of whom 30,000 were Turks; 22,000 Greeks; 10,000 Bulgarians; 4,000 Armenians; 12,000 Jews; and 2,000 more citizens of unclassified ethnic/religious backgrounds.

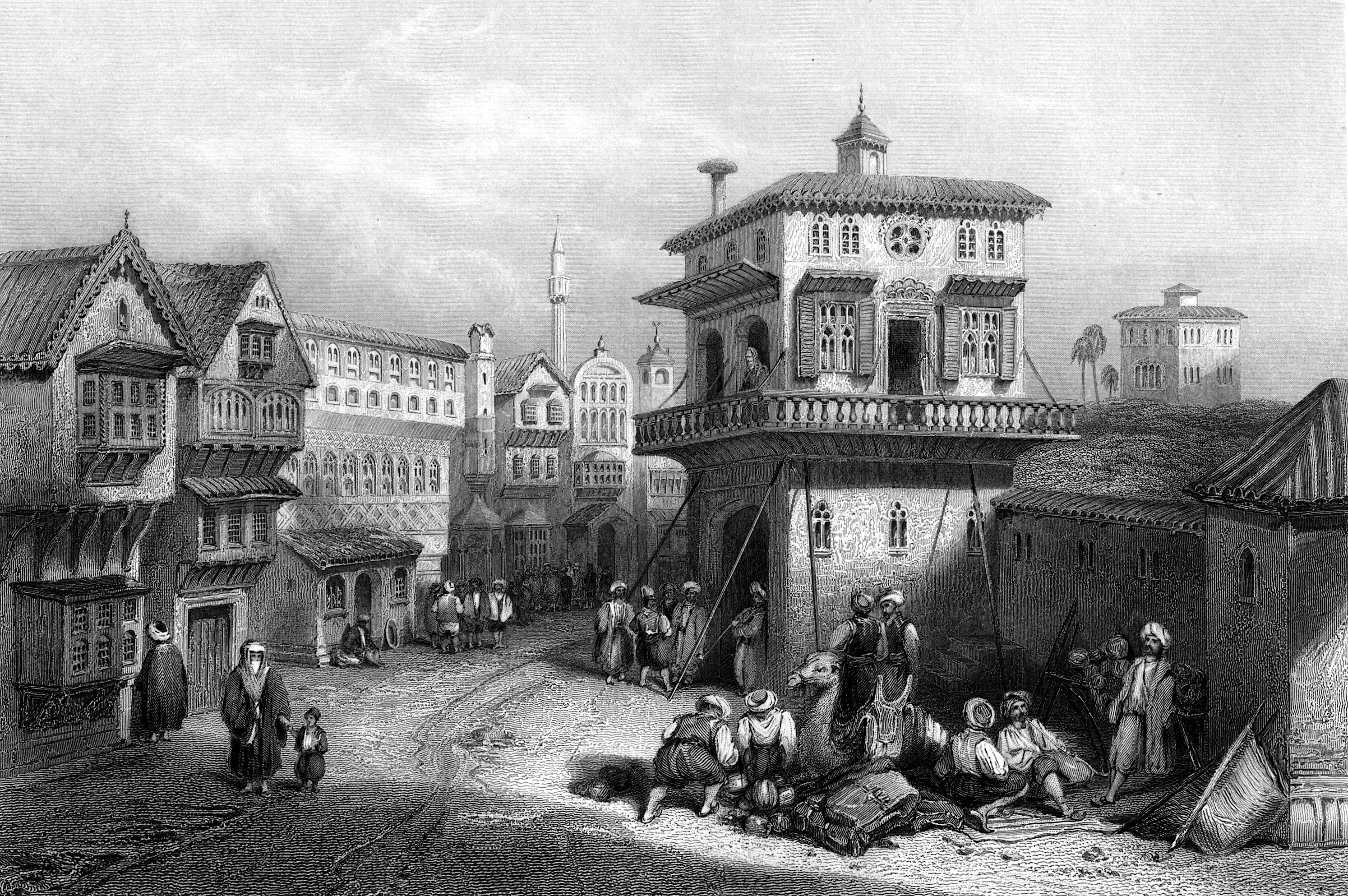
A Street in the Suburbs of Adrianople - Walsh Robert & Allom Thomas, circa 1836.

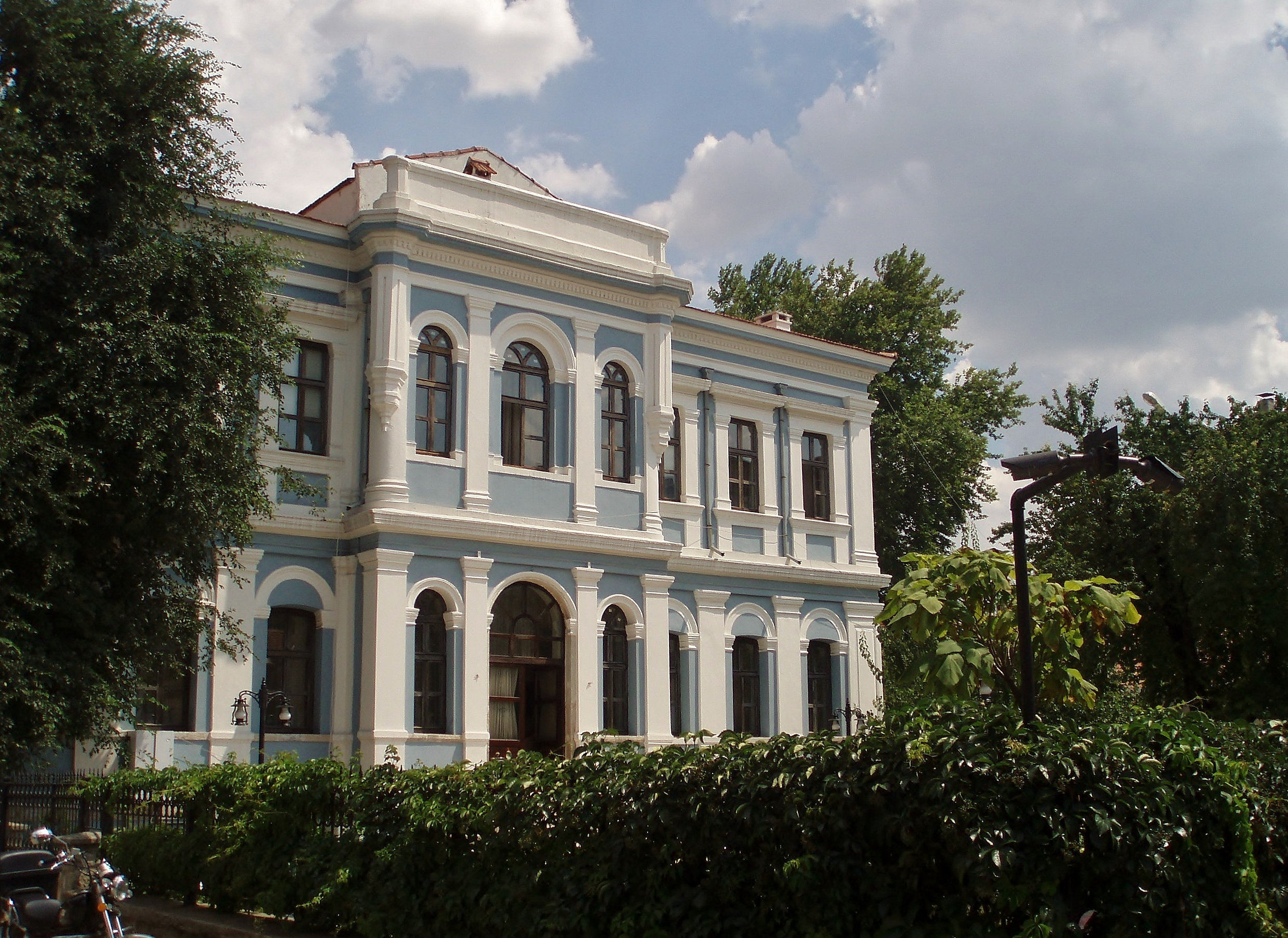
Zappeion Greek Girls' Central School of Adrianople, the Greek Girls' School in Edirne (1884).

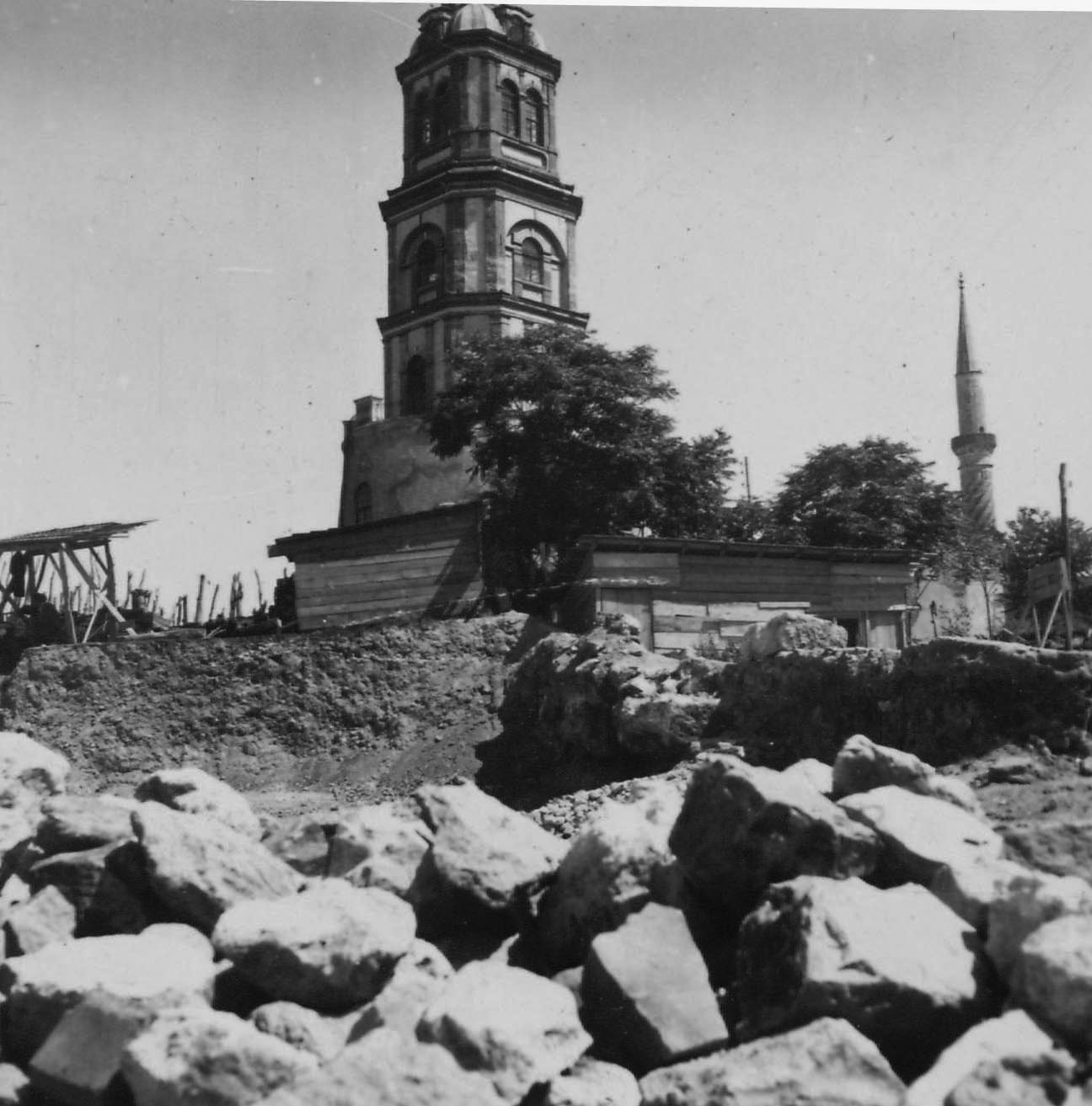
Macedonia Tower after its transformation into the Edirne Clock Tower in the first quarter of the 20th century.

Adrianople was a vital fortress defending Constantinople and Eastern Thrace during the Balkan Wars of 1912–13. It was briefly occupied by the Bulgarians in 1913, following the Siege of Adrianople. The Great Powers – Britain, Italy, France and Russia – attempted to coerce the Ottoman Empire into ceding Adrianople to Bulgaria during the temporary winter truce of the First Balkan War. The belief that the government was willing to give up the city created a scandal for the Ottoman government in Constantinople (as Adrianople was a former capital of the Empire), leading to the 1913 Ottoman coup d'état led by the Committee of Union and Progress (CUP) under Enver Pasha. Although it was victorious in the coup, the CUP was unable to stop the Bulgarians from capturing the city after fighting resumed in the spring. Despite relentless pressure from the Great Powers, the Ottoman empire never officially ceded the city to Bulgaria.

Edirne was swiftly reconquered by the Ottomans during the Second Balkan War under the leadership of Enver Pasha (who proclaimed himself the "second conqueror of Adrianople" after Murad I) following the collapse of the Bulgarian army in the region.

The entire Armenian population of the city was deported to Syria and Mesopotamia during the Armenian genocide on 27–28 October 1915 and 17–18 February 1916. Their homes and businesses were sold at low prices to Turkish Muslims.

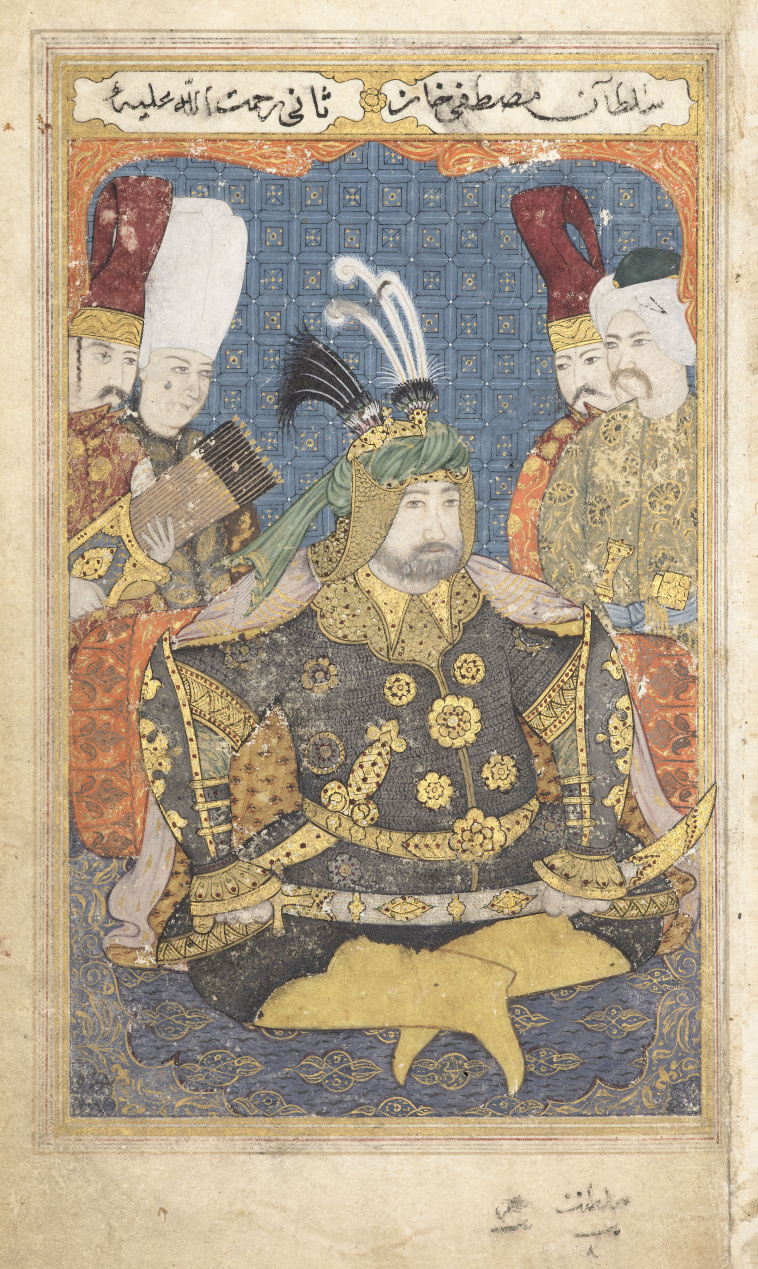
Mustafa II dressed in full armour, who reigned over the Ottoman Empire from 1695 to 1703, was born in the Edirne Palace, early 18th century.

During the Greek War of Independence, the Russo-Turkish War (1877–1878) and the Balkan Wars (1912–1913), Balkan-Muslims fled to Edirne and became known as Muhacir.

==== Administrative arrangements ====
Adrianople was a sanjak centre during the Ottoman period and was bound to, successively, the Rumeli Eyalet and Silistre Eyalet before becoming a provincial capital of the Eyalet of Edirne at the beginning of the 19th century; until 1878, the Eyalet of Adrianople comprised the sanjaks of Edirne, Tekfurdağı, Gelibolu, Filibe, and İslimye. After land reforms in 1867, the Eyalet of Adrianople became the Vilayet of Adrianople.

=== Turkish Republic ===
Adrianople/Edirne was ceded to Greece by the Treaty of Sèvres in 1920, but recaptured and annexed by Turkey after the Greek defeat at the end of the Greco-Turkish War, also known as the Western Front of the larger Turkish War of Independence, in 1922. Under the Greek administration, Edirne (officially known as Adrianople) was the capital of the Adrianople Prefecture.

Historical population
Year	Pop.	±%
1400s	70,000	—
1500s	105,000	+50.0%
1700s	35,000	−66.7%
1800s	33,000	−5.7%
1900s	68,661	+108.1%
1927	34,528	−49.7%
1965	78,161	+126.4%
1970	84,531	+8.1%
1975	94,449	+11.7%
1980	105,503	+11.7%
1985	120,663	+14.4%
1990	124,361	+3.1%
2000	140,830	+13.2%
2010	152,993	+8.6%
2014	165,979	+8.5%
2022	180,002	+8.4%

From 1934 onwards Edirne was the seat of the Second Inspectorate General, in which an Inspector General governed the provinces of Edirne, Çanakkale, Tekirdaĝ and Kırklareli. The Inspectorate Generals governmental posts were abandoned in 1948, but the legal framework for them was only abolished in 1952 during the government of the Democrat Party.

== Ecclesiastical history ==
Adrianople historically served as a religious center for multiple Christian communities. The city was the seat of a Greek Orthodox metropolitan and an Armenian bishop. It was also the center of a Bulgarian diocese, though this was not officially recognized and the diocese was deprived of a bishop. Small communities of Protestants and Latin Catholics—mainly foreigners—were present as well. The Latin Catholics were under the authority of the vicariate-apostolic of Constantinople.

=== Early Ottoman ecclesiastical history ===
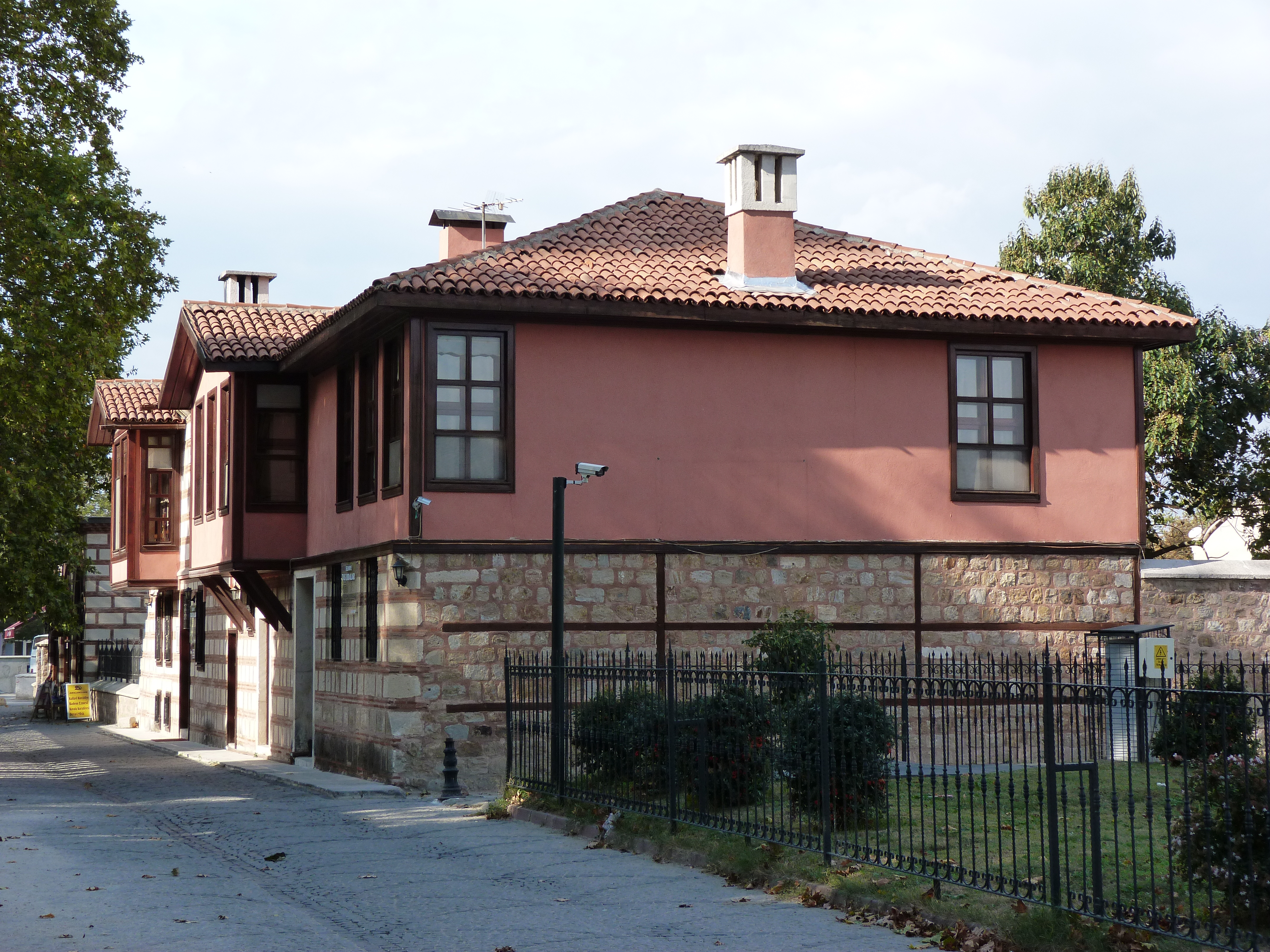
An example of Ottoman architecture in Edirne

After the city fell to the Ottomans around 1369, its church declined significantly, as its properties were confiscated and its Metropolitan was taken prisoner and died in captivity. According to a 1380 synodal document:

[Andrianople] fell years before to the hands of the barbarians, with God’s permission, and most of its populace was taken away captive, especially the upper class with its own shepherd and teacher; the remainder (of the populace) has remained there without a leader until the present. Nor was that protector of the Church able to return to the Queen of Cities so that he even passed away there [in captivity].

In a document from 1389, it is stated that the new Metropolitan of Andrianople could not enter the city, and was forced to continue his duties from Constantinople, where he was allowed to temporarily assume the seat of Agathopolis. The Metropolitan lamented in a document that:

His most holy metropolitanate formerly boasted of many and great good things within the empire of the Rhomaioi, and it was so prosperous that it was able to provide for the many poor people and to furnish them generously with the necessities. But by permission of God, this city was also wasted by the Turks, as every city and land of ours was, and those inhabititing the city became captives. Shortly thereafter Christians returned and settled in the city, but the metropolitanate [here his residence in the city] and all the famous churches were taken by the foreigners, as were also all lands and properties and yearly revenues so that it is not [now] known if ever they existed. Not even cells remain for the dwelling and rest of the Metropolitan.

=== Modern ecclesiastical history ===
Within the city, the parish of Saint Anthony of Padua, run by the Minor Conventuals, operated alongside a girls’ school conducted by the Sisters of Charity of Agram. In the suburb of Karaağaç, there was a Minor Conventual church, a boys’ school managed by the Assumptionists, and a girls’ school run by the Oblates of the Assumption. Mission stations in Tekirdağ and Alexandroupoli maintained schools run by the Minor Conventuals, and Gallipoli had a school managed by the Assumptionists.

Around 1850, from the perspective of the Eastern Catholic Churches, Adrianople was the residence of a Bulgarian vicar-apostolic, overseeing approximately 4,600 Eastern Catholics in the Ottoman vilayet of Thrace, and after 1878, in the Principality of Bulgaria. The Bulgarian Eastern Catholics maintained eighteen parishes or missions, with twenty churches or chapels, thirty-one priests—including six Assumptionists and six Resurrectionists—and eleven schools serving 670 students. In Adrianople proper, only a few United Bulgarians were present, including those served by the Episcopal church of St. Elias and the churches of St. Demetrius and Sts. Cyril and Methodius, the latter served by the Resurrectionists, who also operated a college with ninety students. In Karaağaç, the Assumptionists ran a parish and a seminary with fifty pupils.

Additionally, the statistics for Eastern Catholics included Greek Catholic missions in Malgara (now Malkara) and Daoudili (now Davuteli village in Malkara), with four priests and about 200 faithful, as these missions were administratively part of the Bulgarian Vicariate.

The Roman Catholic diocese of Adrianople was later discontinued and exists today only as a titular metropolitan archbishopric, officially named Hadrianopolis in Haemimonto, to distinguish it from other sees named Hadrianopolis.

In 2018, archaeologists discovered the remains of a Byzantine church in Edirne. Built around 500 AD, it represents an early Byzantine period structure.

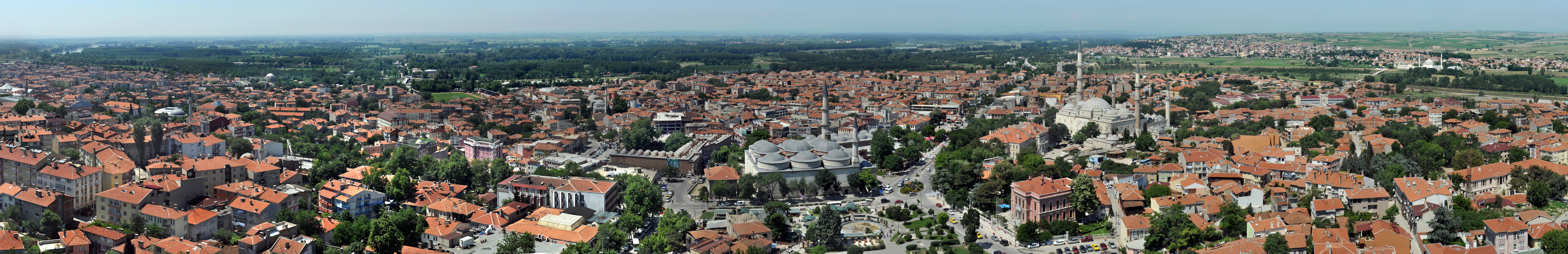
Panoramic view of the city from Selimiye Mosque.

== Geography ==
=== Climate ===
Edirne has a borderline humid subtropical (Cfa) and hot-summer Mediterranean climate (Csa) in the Köppen climate classification, and a temperate oceanic climate (Do) in the Trewartha climate classification. Edirne has hot, moderately dry summers and chilly, wet and often snowy winters.

Highest recorded temperature:44.1 °C (111.4 °F) on 25 July 2007
Lowest recorded temperature:−19.5 °C (−3.1 °F) on 14 January 1954

Climate data for Edirne (1991–2020, extremes 1930–2023)
Month	Jan	Feb	Mar	Apr	May	Jun	Jul	Aug	Sep	Oct	Nov	Dec	Year
Record high °C (°F)	20.5 (68.9)	24.5 (76.1)	28.0 (82.4)	33.5 (92.3)	37.1 (98.8)	42.6 (108.7)	44.1 (111.4)	41.9 (107.4)	39.9 (103.8)	35.8 (96.4)	28.0 (82.4)	22.9 (73.2)	44.1 (111.4)
Mean daily maximum °C (°F)	7.1 (44.8)	10.2 (50.4)	14.3 (57.7)	19.8 (67.6)	25.5 (77.9)	30.1 (86.2)	32.7 (90.9)	33.1 (91.6)	27.9 (82.2)	21.0 (69.8)	14.4 (57.9)	8.4 (47.1)	20.4 (68.7)
Daily mean °C (°F)	2.8 (37.0)	4.8 (40.6)	8.3 (46.9)	13.2 (55.8)	18.5 (65.3)	22.9 (73.2)	25.3 (77.5)	25.4 (77.7)	20.6 (69.1)	14.8 (58.6)	9.3 (48.7)	4.4 (39.9)	14.2 (57.6)
Mean daily minimum °C (°F)	−0.4 (31.3)	0.7 (33.3)	3.5 (38.3)	7.3 (45.1)	12.1 (53.8)	16.1 (61.0)	18.2 (64.8)	18.3 (64.9)	14.2 (57.6)	9.9 (49.8)	5.4 (41.7)	1.2 (34.2)	8.9 (48.0)
Record low °C (°F)	−19.5 (−3.1)	−19.0 (−2.2)	−12.0 (10.4)	−4.1 (24.6)	0.7 (33.3)	6.0 (42.8)	8.0 (46.4)	8.9 (48.0)	0.2 (32.4)	−3.7 (25.3)	−9.4 (15.1)	−14.9 (5.2)	−19.5 (−3.1)
Average precipitation mm (inches)	65.8 (2.59)	53.3 (2.10)	52.8 (2.08)	44.0 (1.73)	57.5 (2.26)	46.0 (1.81)	39.6 (1.56)	24.0 (0.94)	39.2 (1.54)	66.1 (2.60)	66.4 (2.61)	70.5 (2.78)	625.2 (24.61)
Average precipitation days	12	8.6	10.33	9.93	9.83	8.33	5.37	3.7	5.43	7.9	9.8	12.73	104
Average snowy days	4.6	3.5	1.8	0.1	0	0	0	0	0	0.2	0.5	3.2	13.9
Average relative humidity (%)	82.6	76.9	72.7	67.5	65.2	62.1	56.9	56.2	62.8	74.6	80.2	82.5	70.0
Mean monthly sunshine hours	67.1	96.2	127.7	170.6	230.2	249.5	287.9	278.3	197.7	135.4	85.4	57.6	1,931.4
Mean daily sunshine hours	2.2	3.5	4.2	5.7	7.4	8.5	9.3	9.0	6.6	4.4	2.9	1.9	5.5
Source 1: Turkish State Meteorological Service
Source 2: NOAA(humidity, sun 1991–2020), Meteomanz(snowy days 2000–2023)

=== Quarters ===
Edirne consists of 24 quarters:

- Murat
- Abdurrahman
- Babademirtaş
- Barutluk
- Çavuşbey
- Dilaverbey
- Fatih
- Istasyon
- Karaağaç
- Kocasinan
- Medresealibey
- Menzilahir
- Meydan
- Mithatpaşa
- Nişancıpaşa
- Sabuni
- Sarıcapaşa
- Şükrüpaşa
- Talatpaşa
- Umurbey
- Yancıkçışahin
- Yeniimaret
- Yıldırımbeyazıt
- Yıldırımhacısarraf

== Attractions ==
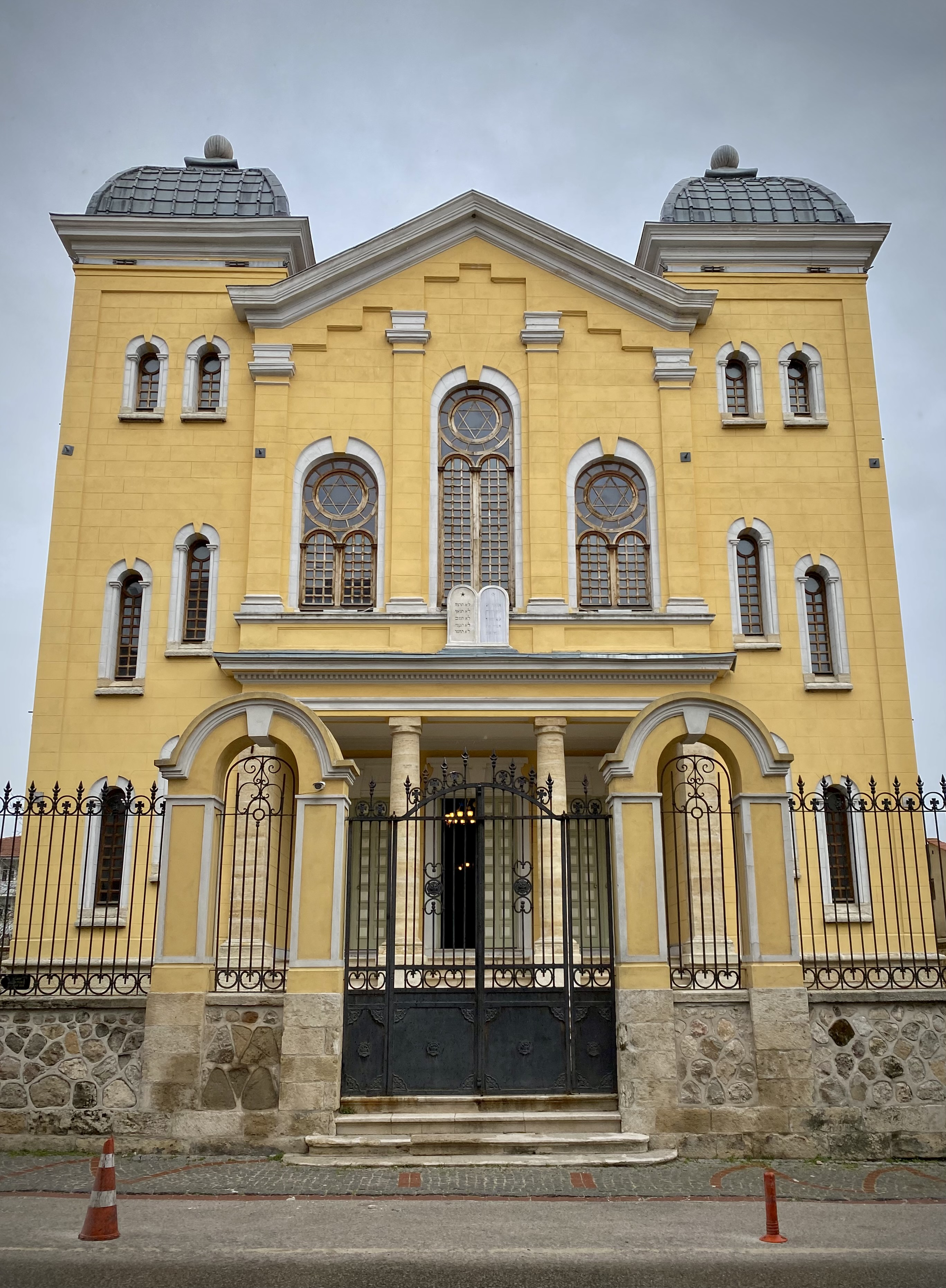
Grand Synagogue of Edirne after restoration in 2015

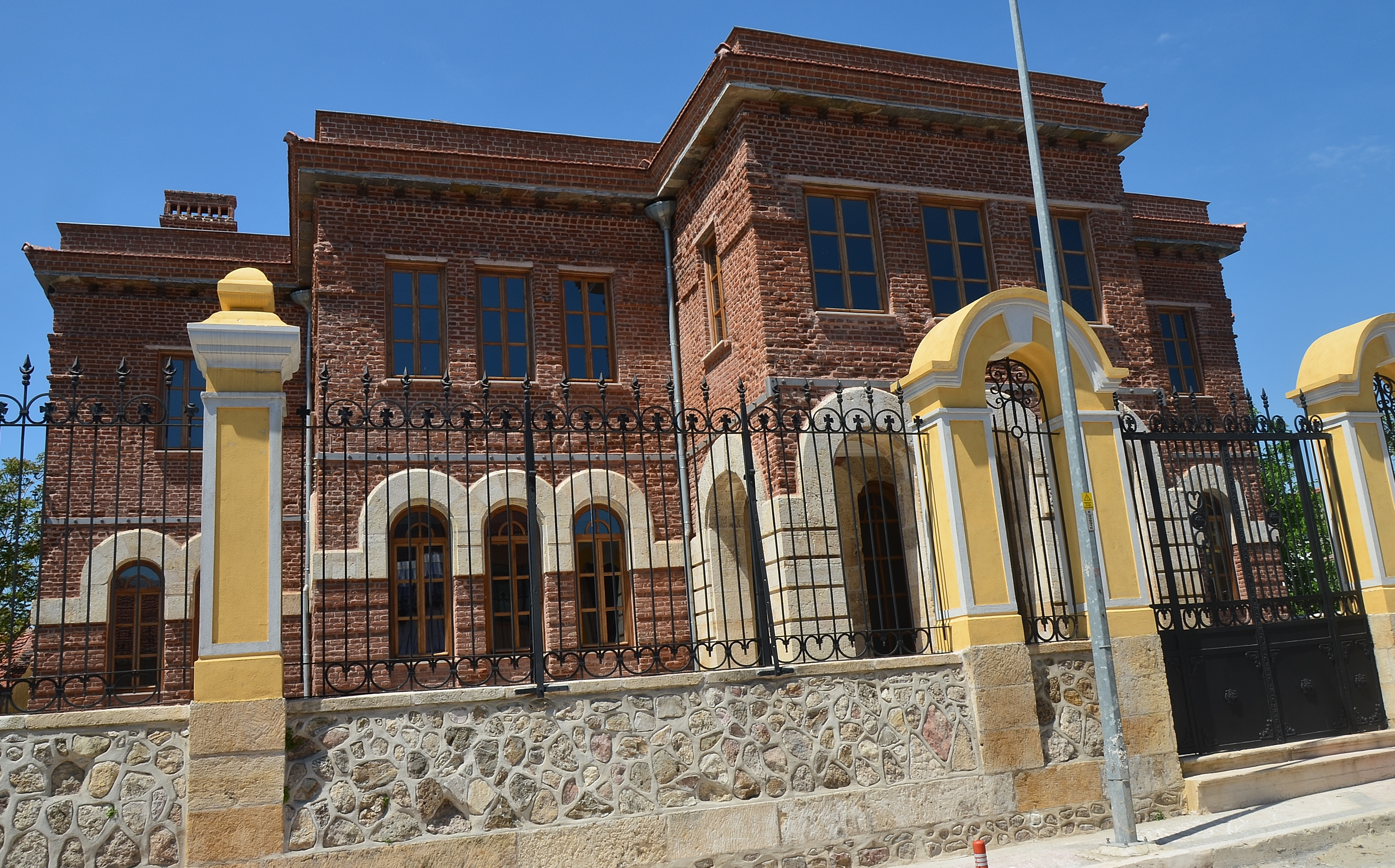
Administrative building behind the Grand Synagogue of Edirne

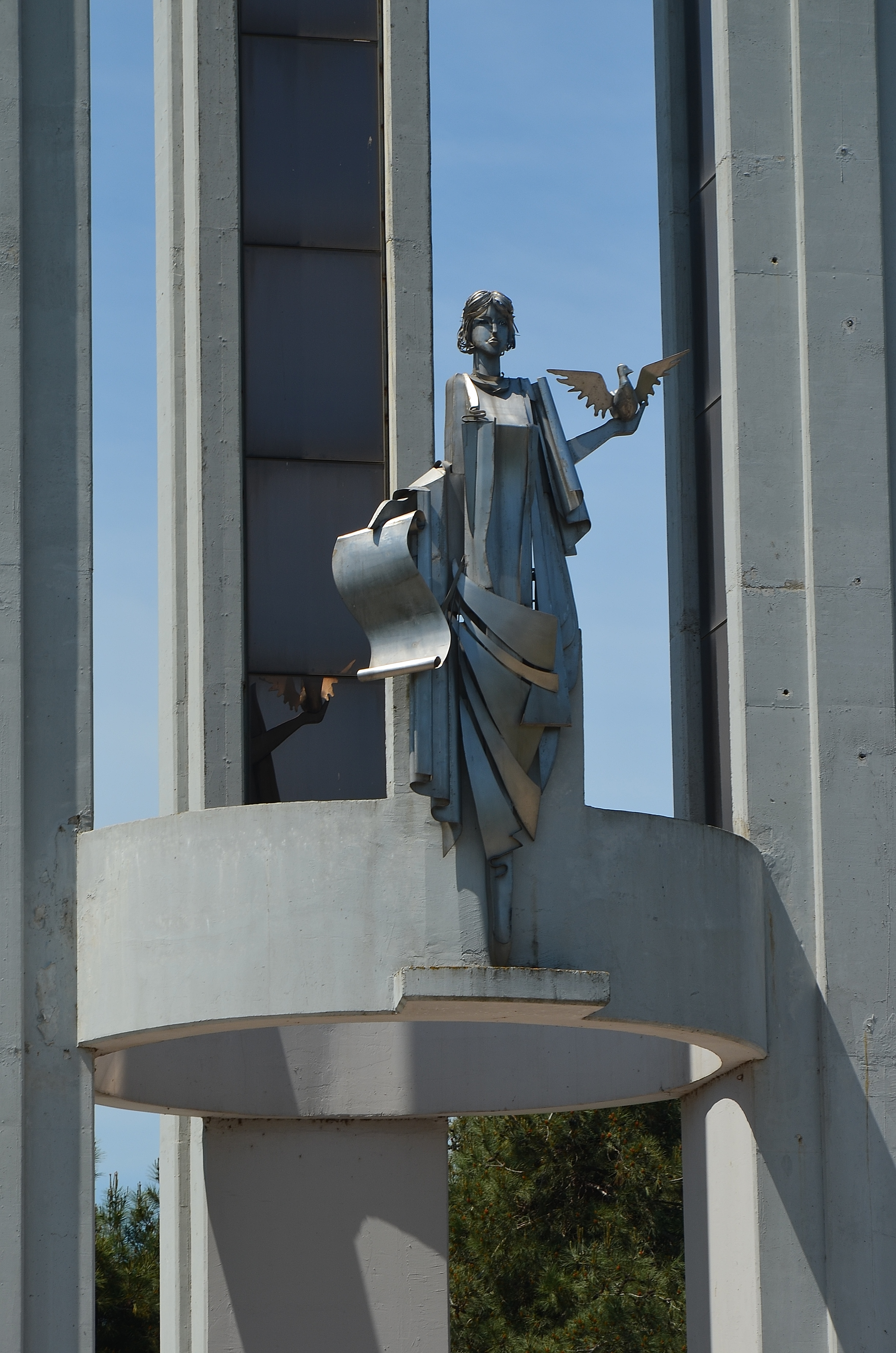
Treaty of Lausanne Monument and Museum in the Karaağaç suburb of Edirne

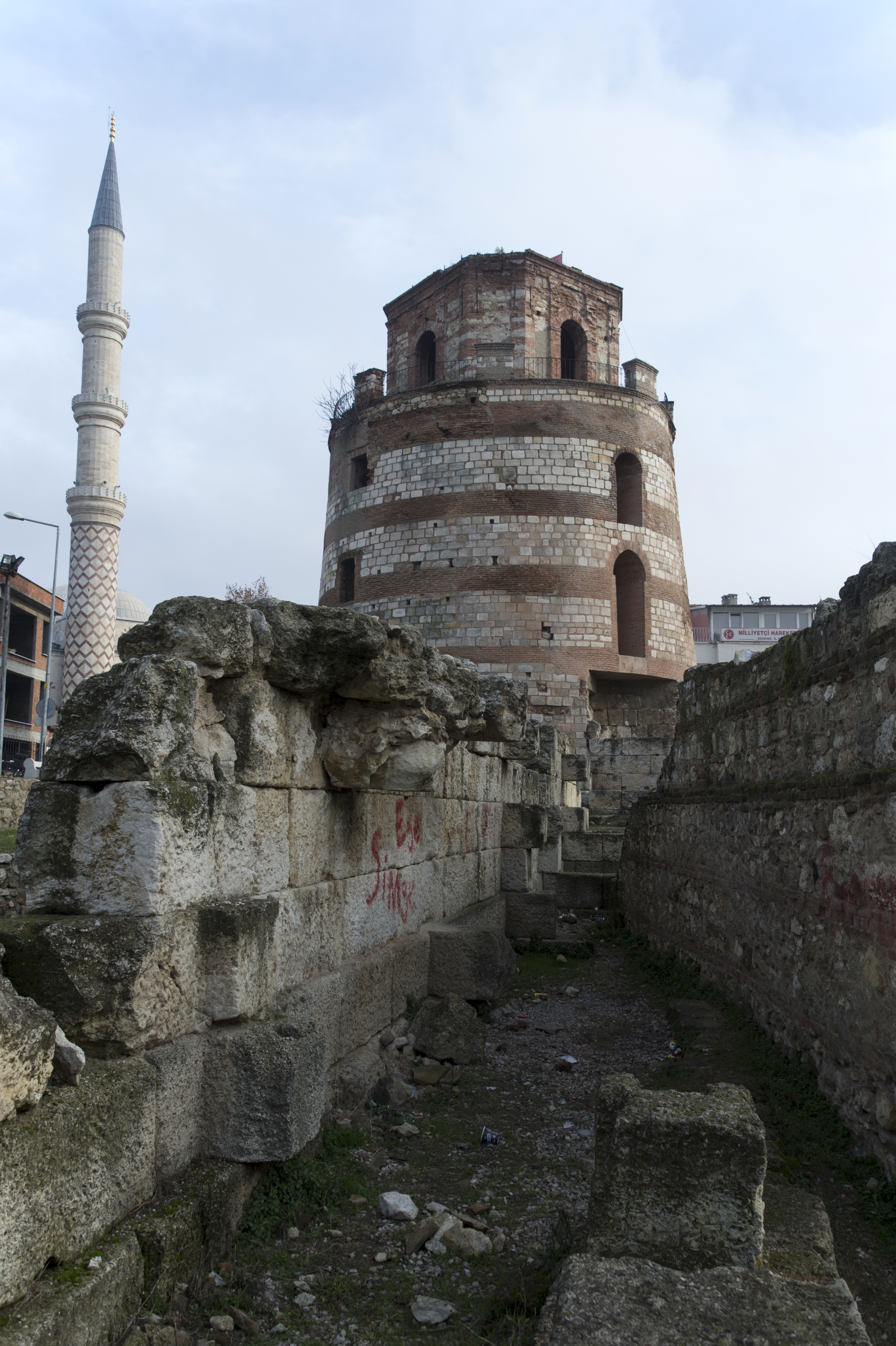
The remains of Roman fortifications next to the so-called "Macedonian tower".

Following the Byzantine defeat at the Battle of Versinikia in 813, the city was temporarily seized by Khan Krum of Bulgaria who moved its inhabitants to the Bulgarian lands north of the Danube. In 1077, a rebellion, led by the usurper Nikephoros Bryennios, occurred in Adrianople against Emperor Michael VII Doukas.

Edirne is famed for its many mosques, medreses and other Ottoman monuments.

=== Mosques ===
The Selimiye Mosque, built in 1575 and designed by Turkey's greatest architect, Mimar Sinan (c. 1489/1490–1588), is the most important monument in the city and became a UNESCO world heritage site in 2011. It used to have the highest minarets in Turkey, at 70.90 m (232.6 ft) before the completion of the Çamlıca Mosque in 2019 which features minarets standing at 107.1 m (351 ft) tall. Sinan himself believed the dome to be higher than that of Hagia Sophia, the former Byzantine Orthodox Cathedral in Istanbul, but modern measuring methods seem to suggest otherwise. Named after Sultan Selim II (r. 1566–1574) who commissioned it but did not live to see its completion, the mosque is decorated with Turkish marble and magnificent İznik tiles. It is the centre of a considerable complex of contemporary buildings.

Work started on the Eski Cami (Old Mosque) in 1403 but was not completed until 1422. It was designed in what is usually thought of as the Bursa style. Even finer is the Üç Şerefli Mosque (Three-Balconied Mosque) which was built between 1437 and 1447 for Sultan Murad II. It was the largest mosque built in the Ottoman provinces before the conquest of Constantinople. Both these mosques are in the centre of Edirne.

Further away from the centre, the complex of Sultan Beyazid II, built between 1484 and 1488, is the most complete surviving mosque complex in Edirne, consisting of an imaret (soup kitchen), darüşşifa (hospital), timarhane (asylum), hospice, tıp medrese (medical school), tabhane (accommodation for dervishes) bakery and assorted depots. Some parts of the complex now house a museum to the history of Islamic medicine.

=== Edirne Palace ===
Edirne Palace (Ottoman Turkish: Saray-ı Cedid-i Amire for "New Imperial Palace") in the Sarayiçi quarter, was built in the reign of Murad II (r. 1421–1444). Sultan Mehmed II (r. 1444-46; 1451-81) enlarged the palace after a fire in 1457. Much of the palace was destroyed in the 1752 earthquake. In the beginning of the 19th century, the palace served as a storage for military equipment and ammunition. Following the Russian occupation of Edirne in 1829, their camp was stationed in the palace. On January 18, 1878, the palace was set on fire by the order of the Governor of Edirne, Cemil Pasha. The palace gate and kitchen have since been restored. The Kasr-ı Adalet ("Justice Castle"), originally built as part of the palace complex, stands intact next to the small Fatih Bridge over the Tunca river. The splendid appearance of the palace in the late 1460s when it glistened with gold, silver and marble was described by Kritovoulos of İmbros in his History of Mehmed the Conqueror.

=== Other religious monuments ===
Dating back to 1909, the Grand Synagogue of Edirne was restored and re-opened in March 2015. A Roman Catholic and two Bulgarian Orthodox churches are also to be found in the city.

=== Other historic monuments ===
Edirne has three historic covered bazaars: the Kavaflar Arastası (Cobblers Arcade), next to the Selimiye Mosque and constructed to bring in an income to support the külliye; the Bedesten next to the Eski Cami which was supported by the income from the shops; and the Semiz Ali Paşa Çarşısı (Ali Pasha Bazaar, AKA Kapalı Çarşı), another work of Sinan dating back to 1568. The Kavaflar Arastası is the place to come to buy miniature versions of the handmade brooms with mirrors set into them that used to play a part in marriage ceremonies as well as to buy soap in the shape of fruits.

Of the original Roman Hadrianopolis only slight remains of the fortifications survive near the so-called Macedonian Tower, itself probably a part of the defences although much patched-up and altered over the ensuing centuries.

Edirne Museum (Edirne Müzesi) contains collections of local archaeology and ethnography. In the grounds outside can be seen an example of the sort of dolmen to be seen at nearby Lalapaşa.

In the town centre stand the Rüstem Pasha Caravanserai (1560–61) and Ekmekcioğlu Caravanserai (1609–10), designed to accommodate travellers – in the case of the Rüstem Pasha by Mimar Sinan – in the 16th and 17th centuries. The Rüstem Pasha Caravanserai now serves as the Kervansaray Hotel.

The Balkan Wars Memorial Cemetery is located close to the ruins of the Edirne Palace, with an Unknown Soldier monument featuring an Ottoman soldier in front of its entrance.

The Meriç and Tunca rivers, which flow around west and south of the city, are crossed by arched bridges dating back to early Ottoman times.

The historic Karaağaç railway station has been restored to house Trakya University's Faculty of Fine Arts. The Treaty of Lausanne Monument and Museum are in the surrounding park.

== Cuisine ==
The town is famous in Turkey for the Edirne fried liver. Ciğer tava (breaded and deep-fried liver) is often served with a side of cacık, a dish of diluted strained yogurt with chopped cucumber.

== Festivals ==
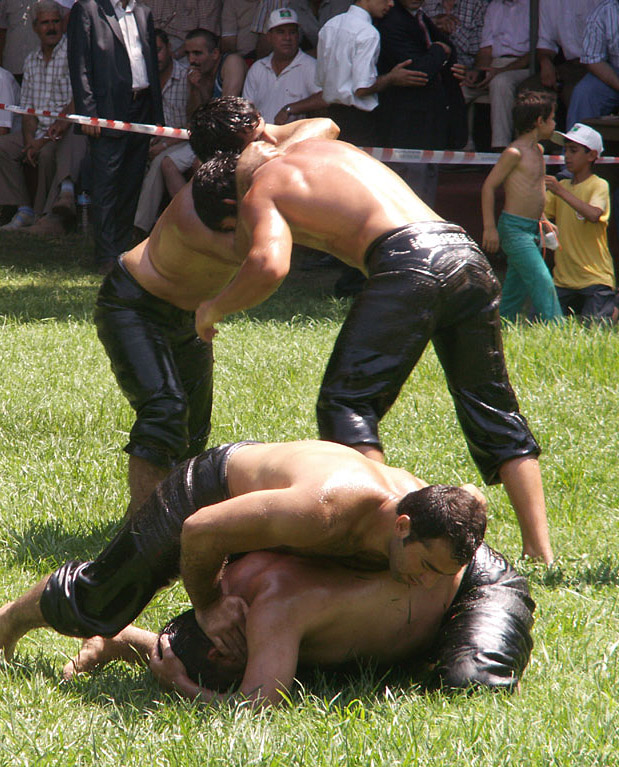
Oil-wrestling at Kırkpınar

The Kırkpınar oil-wrestling tournament is held every year in late June or early July. Kırkpınar Oil Wrestling Festival was inscribed on UNESCO's Representative List of the Intangible Cultural Heritage of Humanity in 2010

Kakava, an international festival celebrated by the Romani people in Turkey is held on 5–6 May each year. Kakava is considered a celebration of renewal, hope and the arrival of spring. It is closely associated with Hidirellez, a seasonal festival symbolizing rebirth and abundance. The celebrations take place in the western province of Edirne at Sarayici. Events include performances by Roma dance troupes clad in traditional attire.

Bocuk Gecesi is a festival of Balkan origin celebrated in mid-January on what is expected to be the coldest day of the year.

== Economy ==
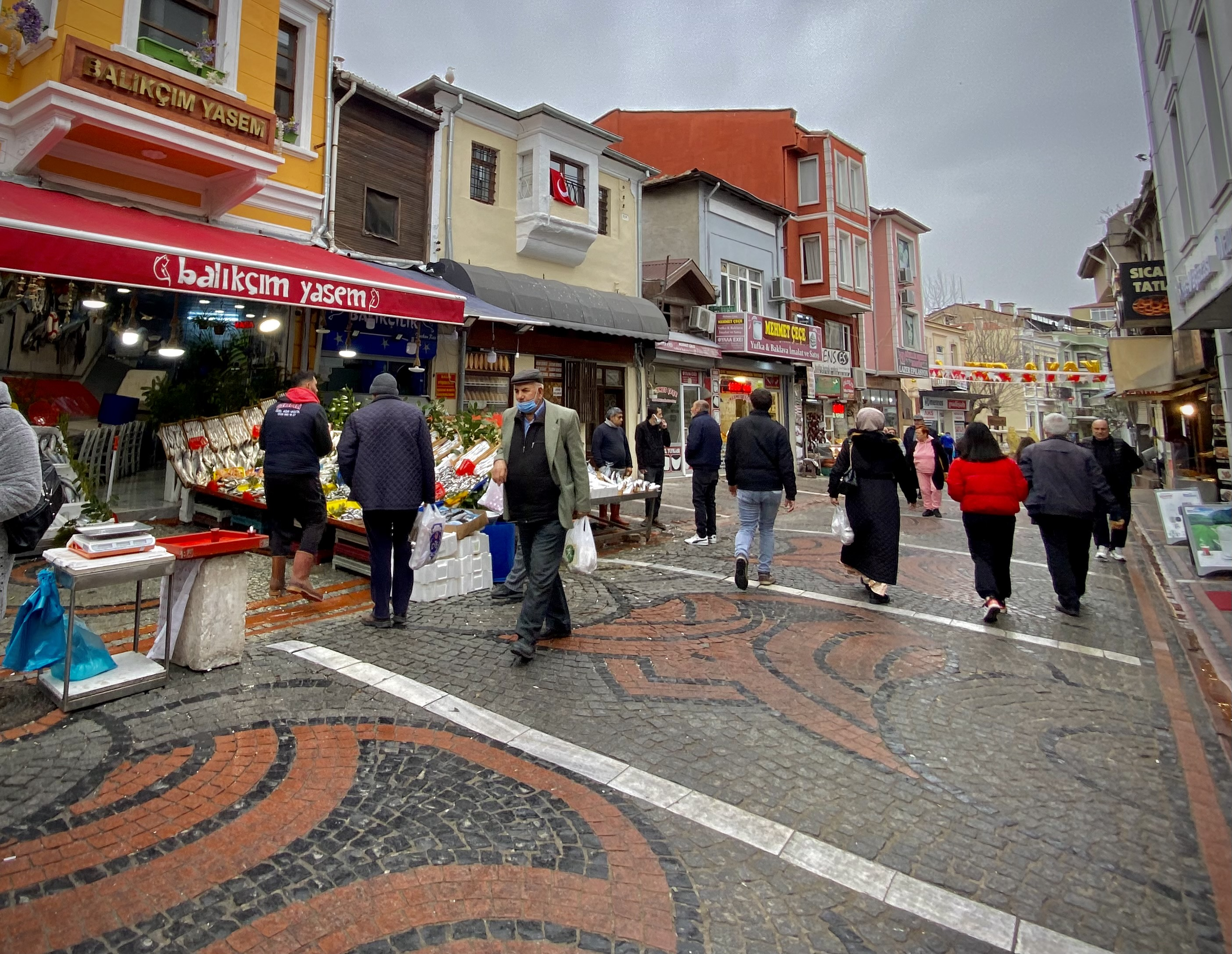
A shopping market in Edirne

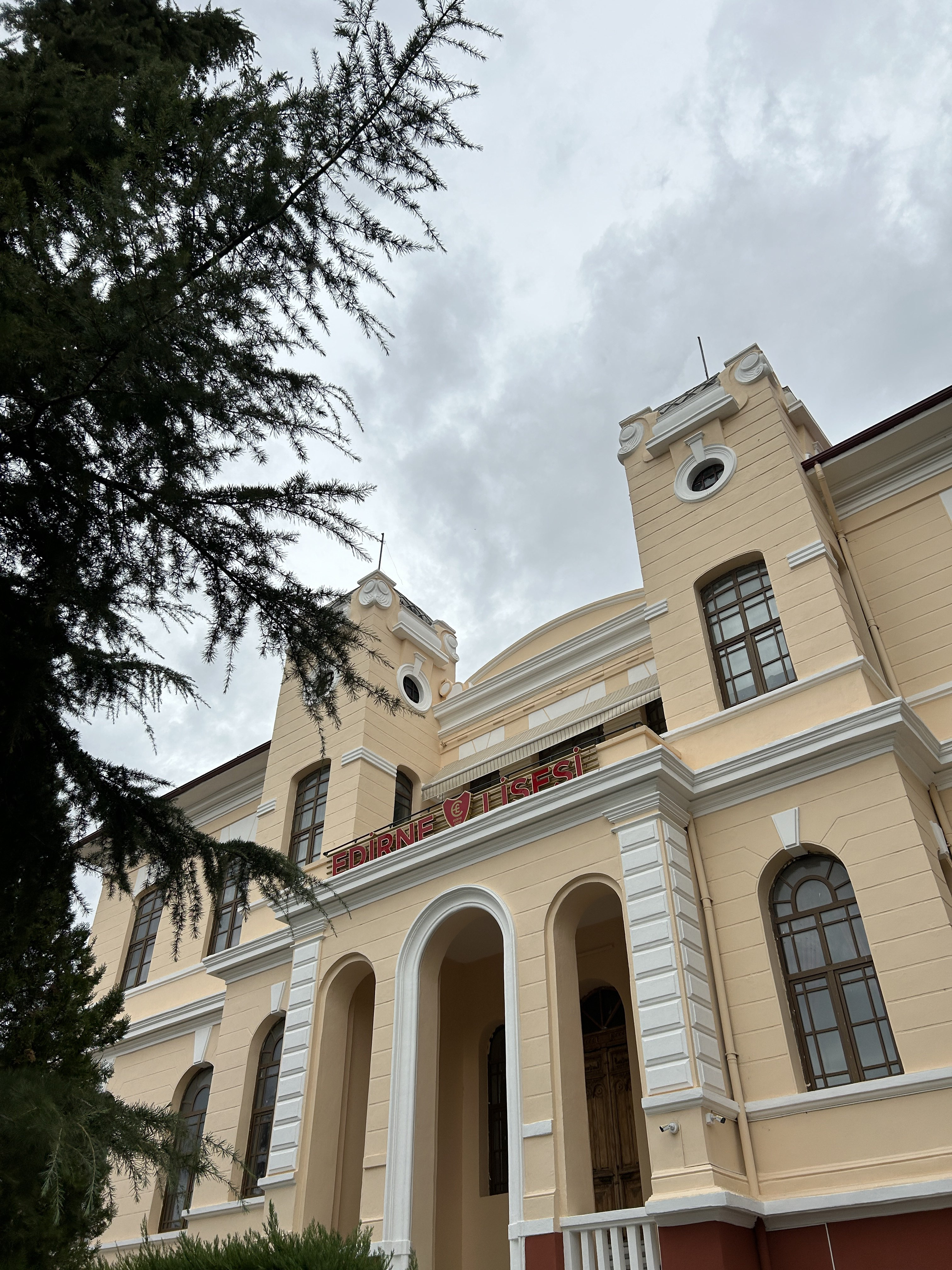
Edirne High School

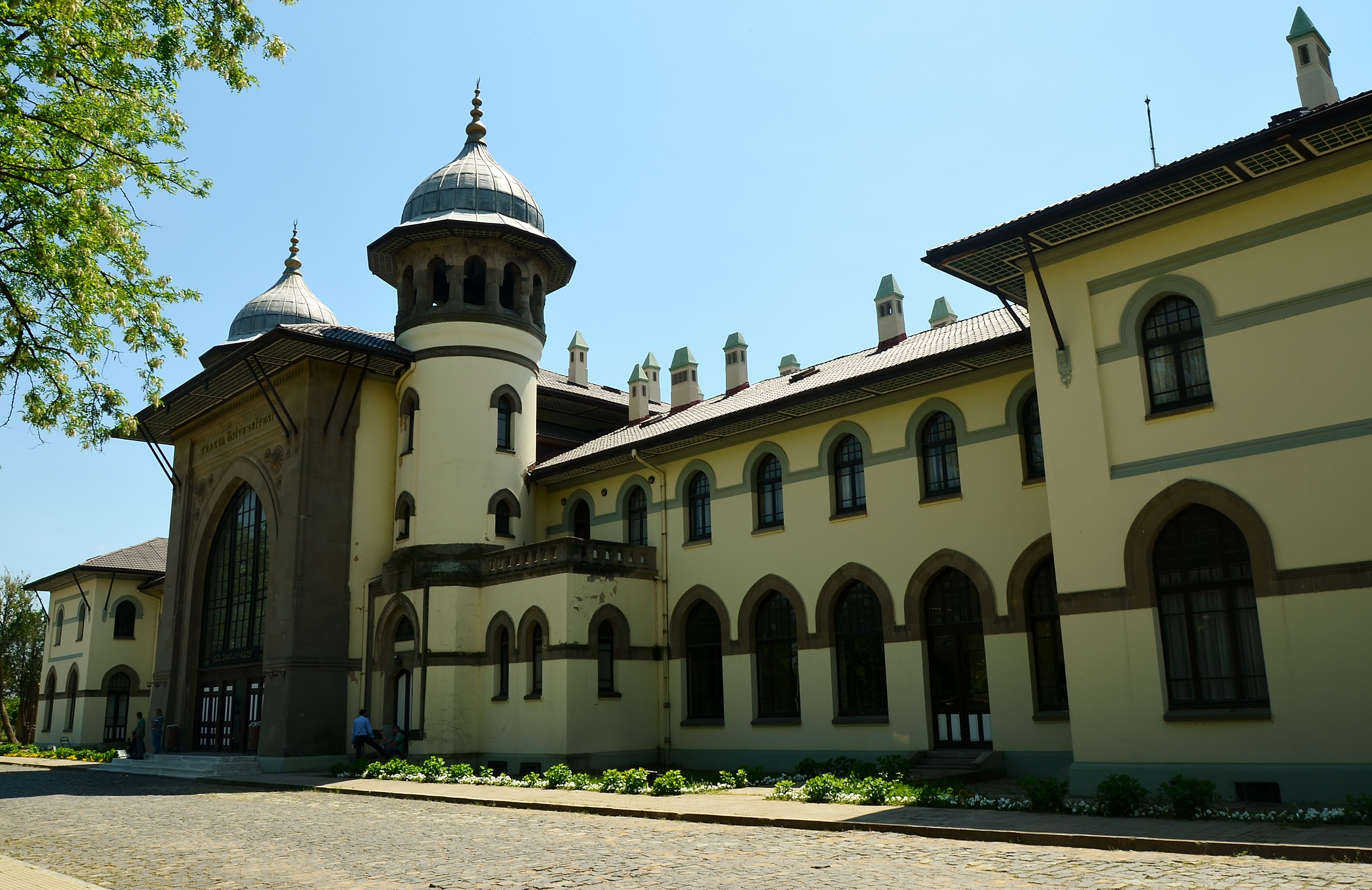
Faculty of Fine Arts building of Trakya University, originally built as Karaağaç railway station.

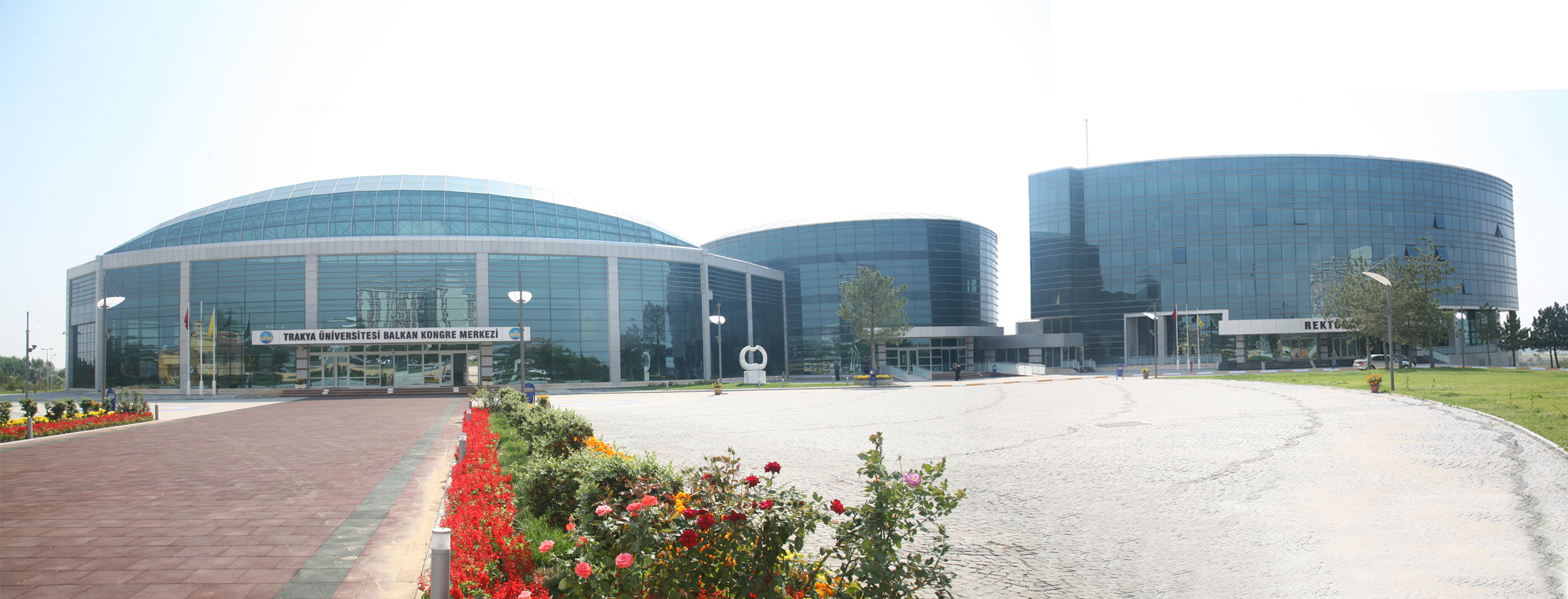
Main building of Trakya University

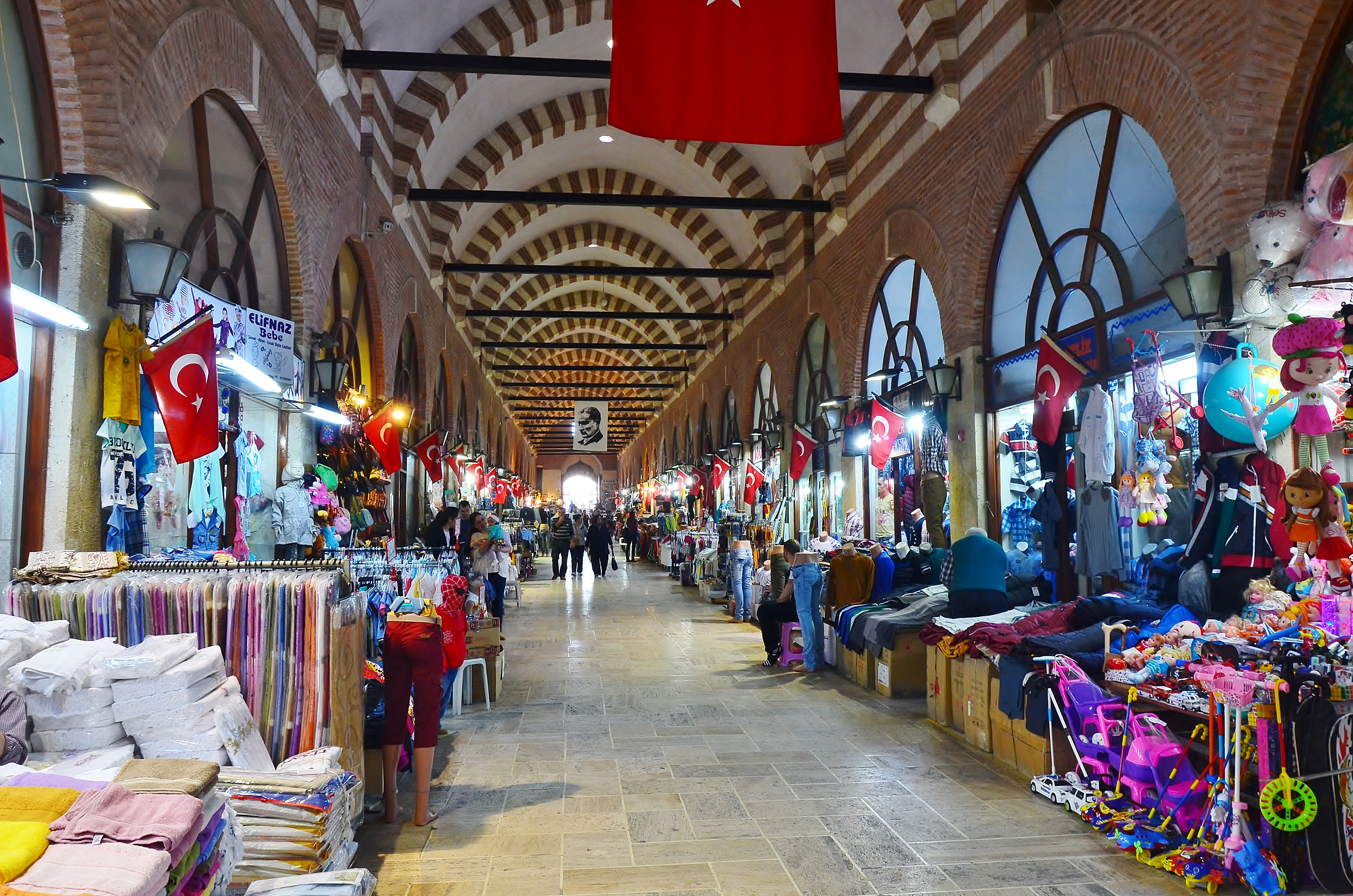
Ali Paşa Çarşısı (Ali Pasha Bazaar)

Edirne's economy largely depends on agriculture. 73% of the working population work in agriculture, fishing, forests and hunting. The lowlands are productive. Corn, sugar beets and sunflowers are the leading crops. Melons, watermelons, rice, tomatoes, eggplants and viniculture are important.

The through highway that connects Europe to Istanbul, Anatolia and the Middle East passes through Edirne.

Industry is developing. Agriculture-based industries (agro-industries) are especially important for the city's economy.

== Education ==
=== Universities ===
- Trakya University, which is linked with Lörrach University through the Erasmus programme of the EU.

=== High schools ===
- Beykent Educational Institutions
- 80th Year of Republic Anatolian High School (80. Yıl Cumhuriyet Anadolu Lisesi in Turkish)
- Edirne Anatolian Teacher Training High School (Edirne Anadolu Öğretmen Lisesi in Turkish: It has been transformed into Edirne Social Sciences High School)
- Edirne Anatolian Technical High School (Edirne Anadolu Teknik Lisesi in Turkish)
- Edirne Beykent High School of Science (Özel Edirne Beykent Fen Lisesi)
- Edirne Beykent High School of Anatolian (Özel Edirne Beykent Anadolu Lisesi)
- Edirne High School (Anatolian High School) (Edirne Lisesi in Turkish)
- Edirne Ilhami Ertem High School (Edirne İlhami Ertem Lİsesi in Turkish)
- Edirne Industrial Vocational High School (Edirne Endüstri Meslek Lisesi in Turkish)
- Edirne Milli Piyango Trade Profession High School (Edirne Milli Piyango Ticaret Meslek Lisesi)
- Edirne Suleyman Demirel Science & Maths High School (Edirne Fen Lisesi in Turkish)
- Edirne Yildirim Anatolian High School (Edirne Anadolu Lisesi – Yıldırım Anadolu Lisesi in Turkish)
- Edirne Fine Arts High School (Edirne Güzel Sanatlar Lisesi in Turkish)

== Gallery ==
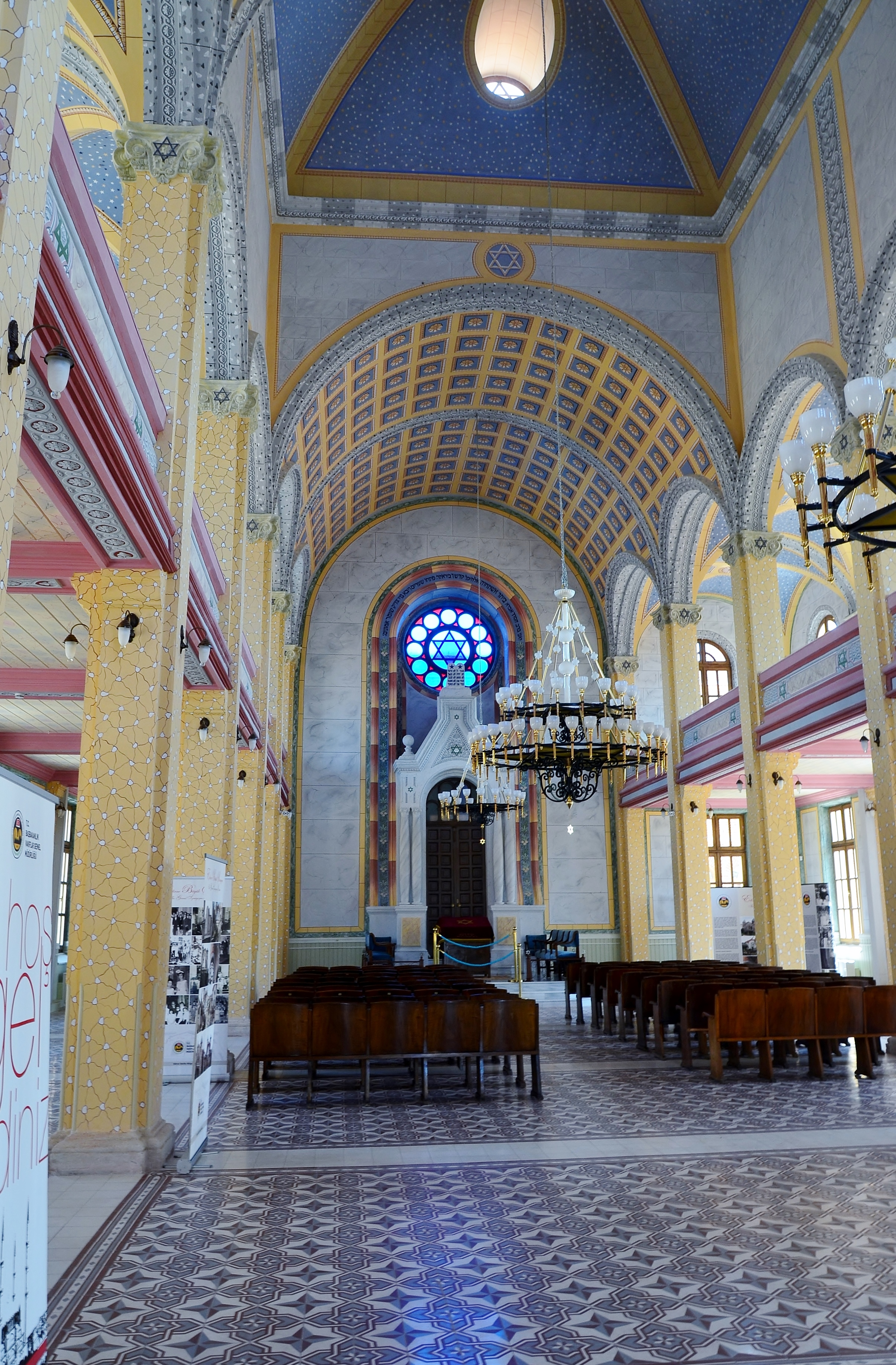
Interior view of the Grand Synagogue of Edirne

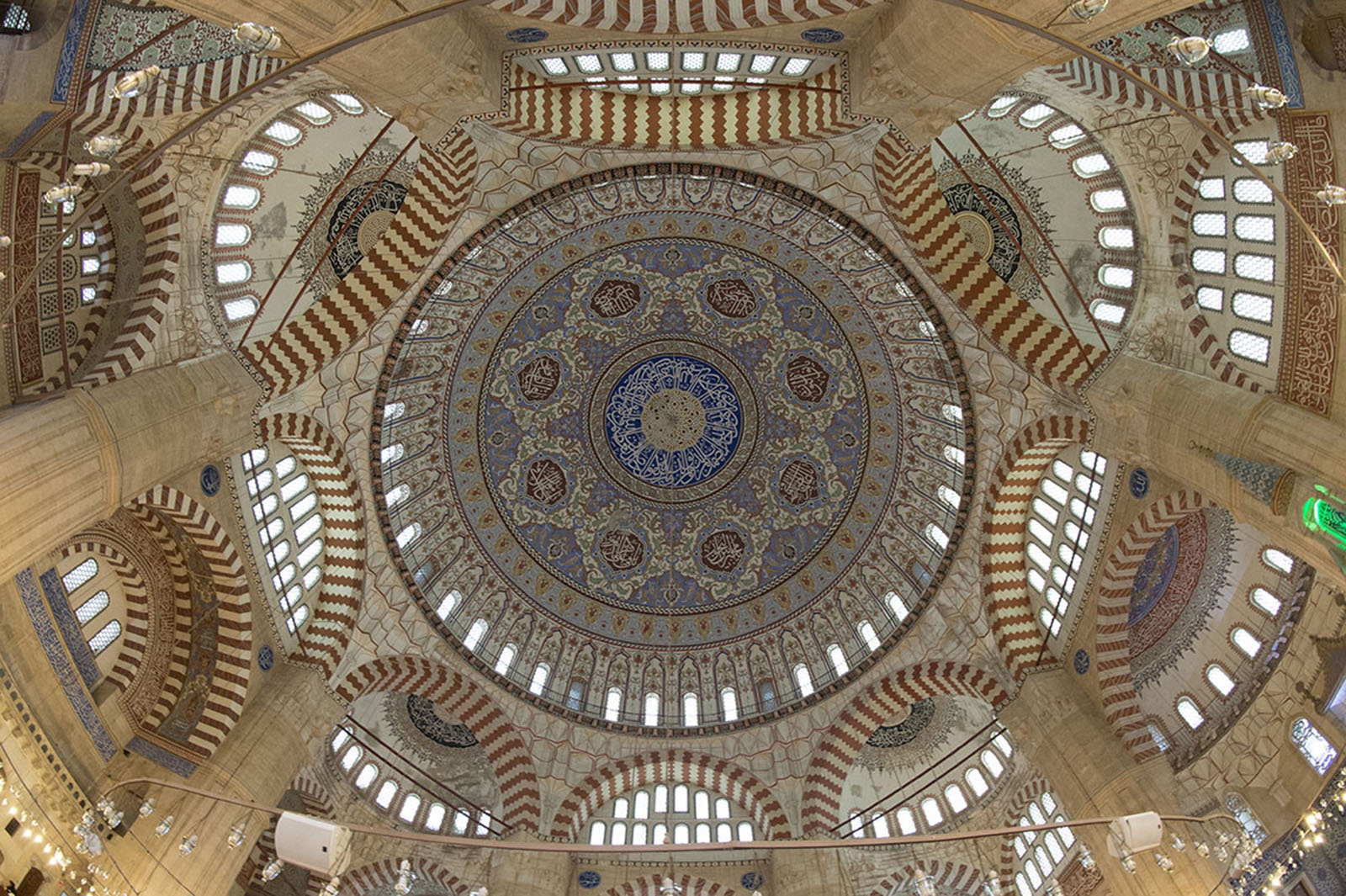
Interior view of the Selimiye Mosque, Edirne

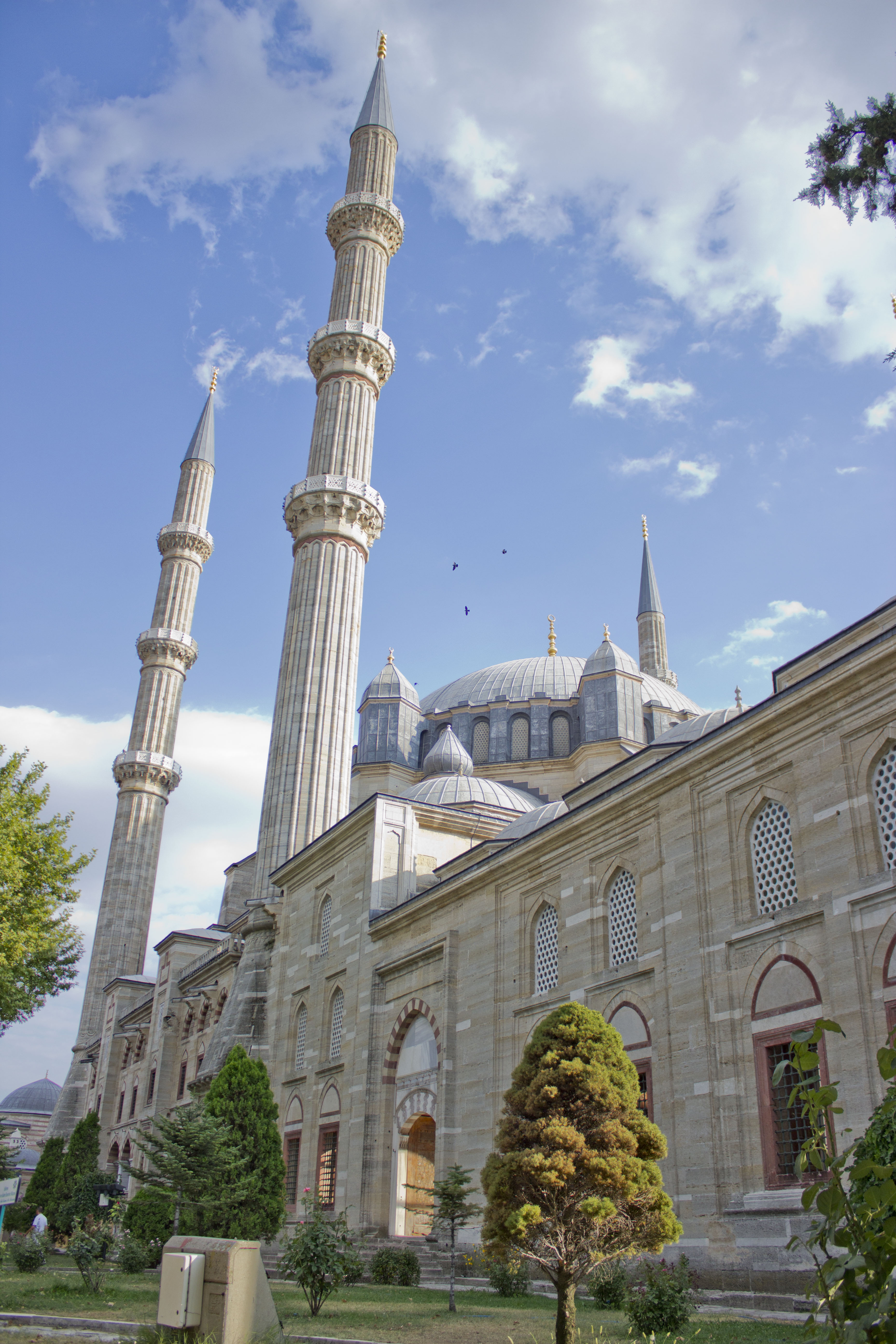
View of the Selimiye Mosque, Edirne

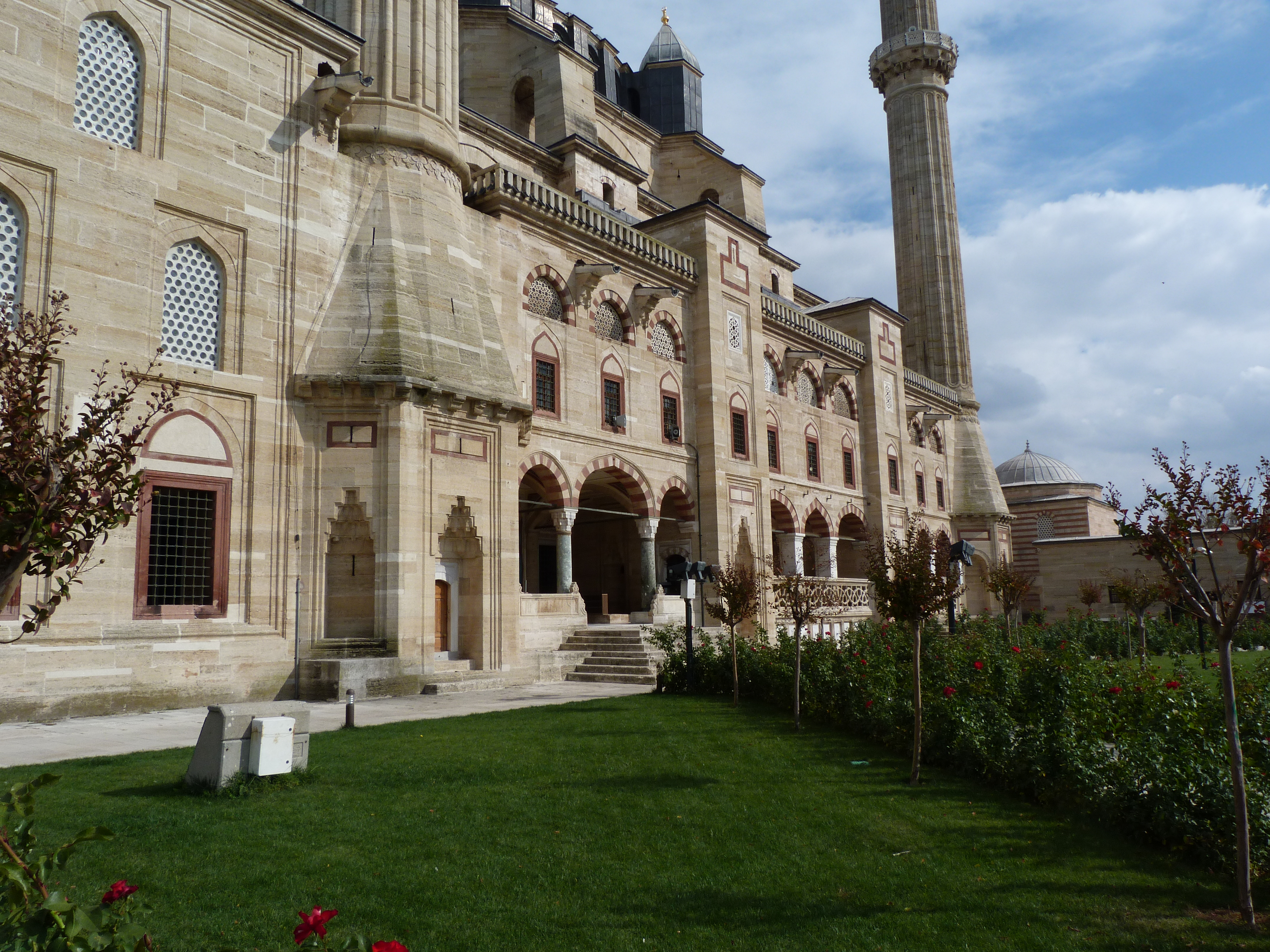
View of the Selimiye Mosque, Edirne

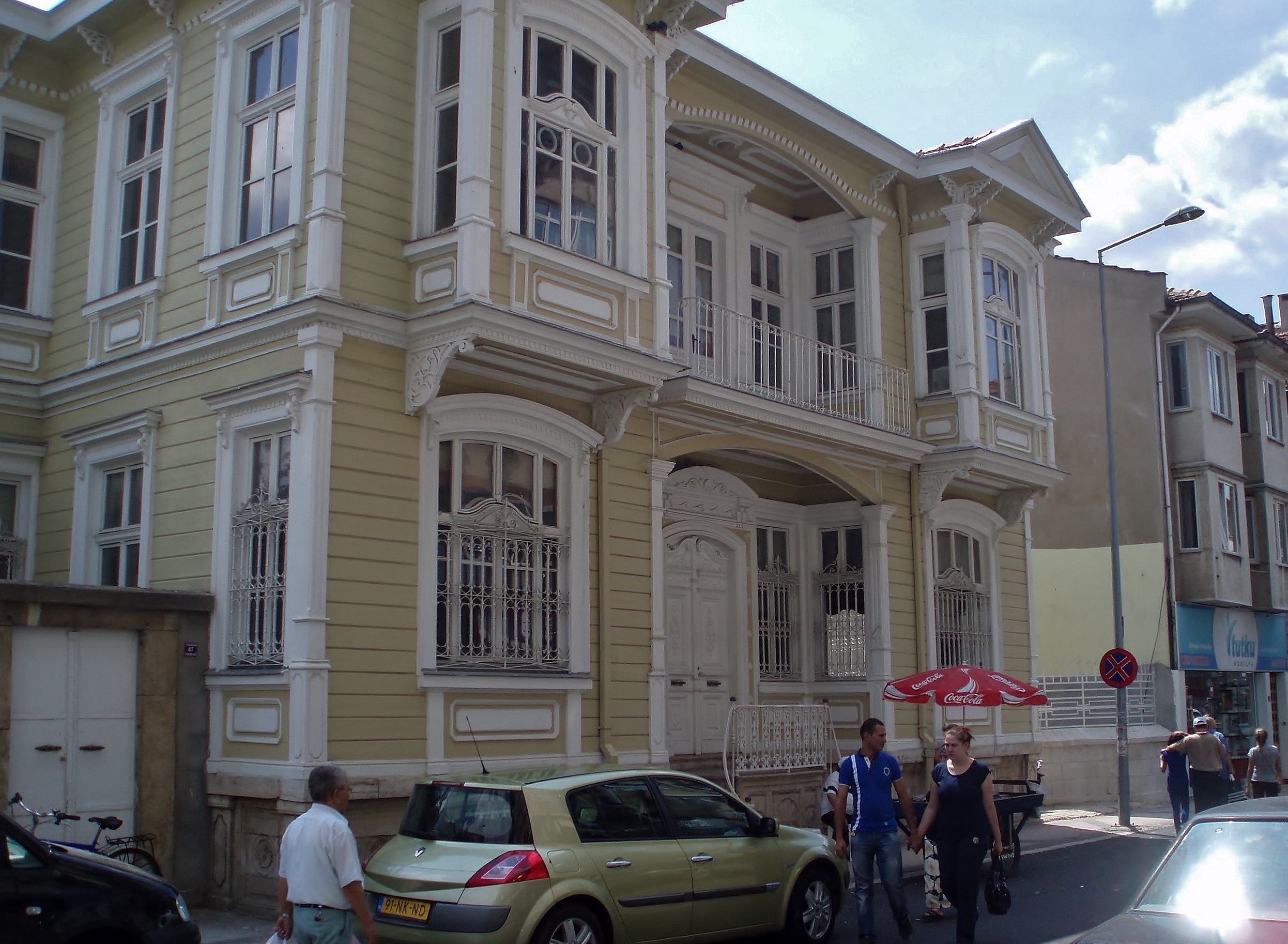
A house in Edirne from the Ottoman period

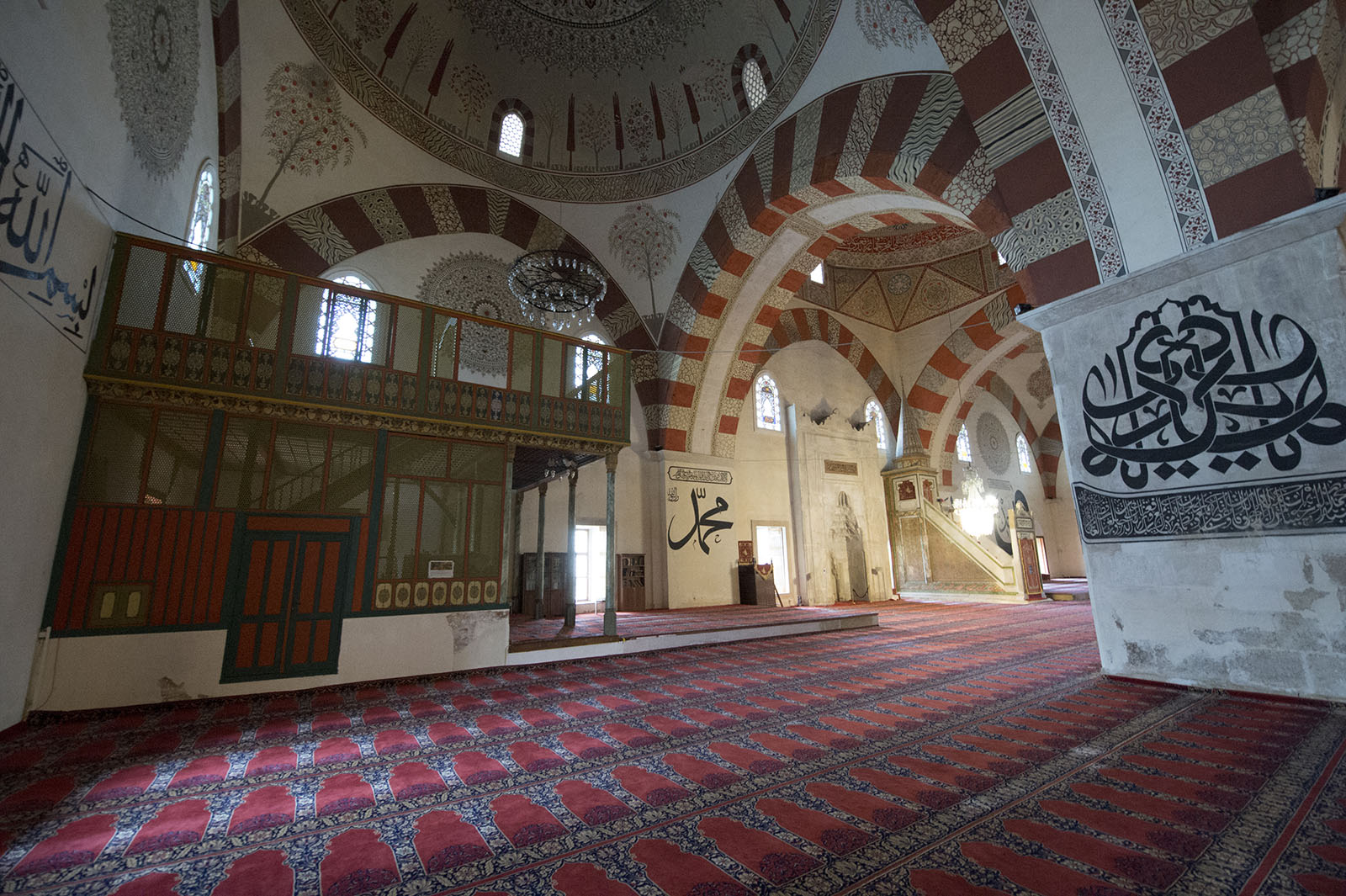
Interior of Eski Cami (Old Mosque)

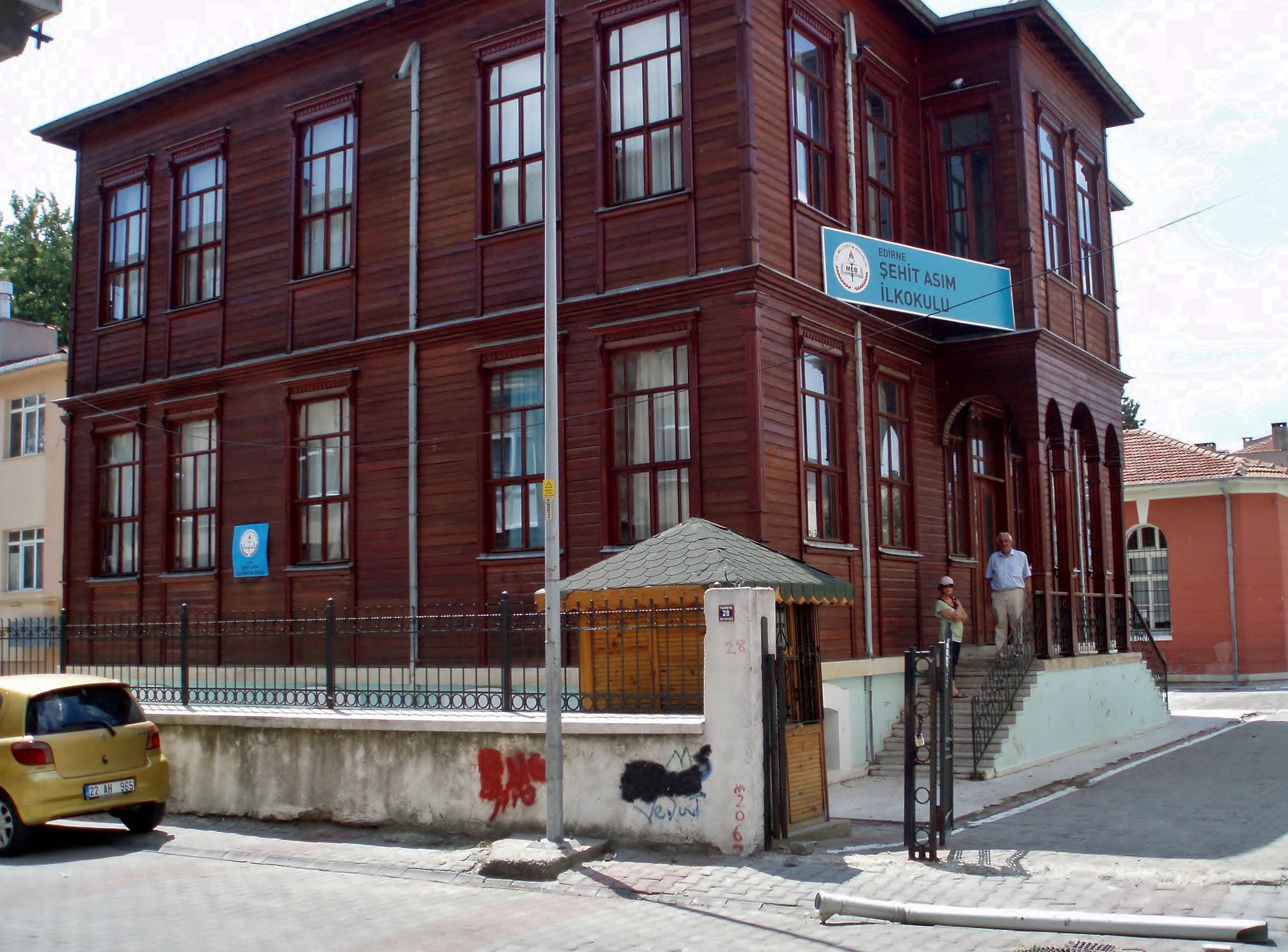
A historic elementary school building

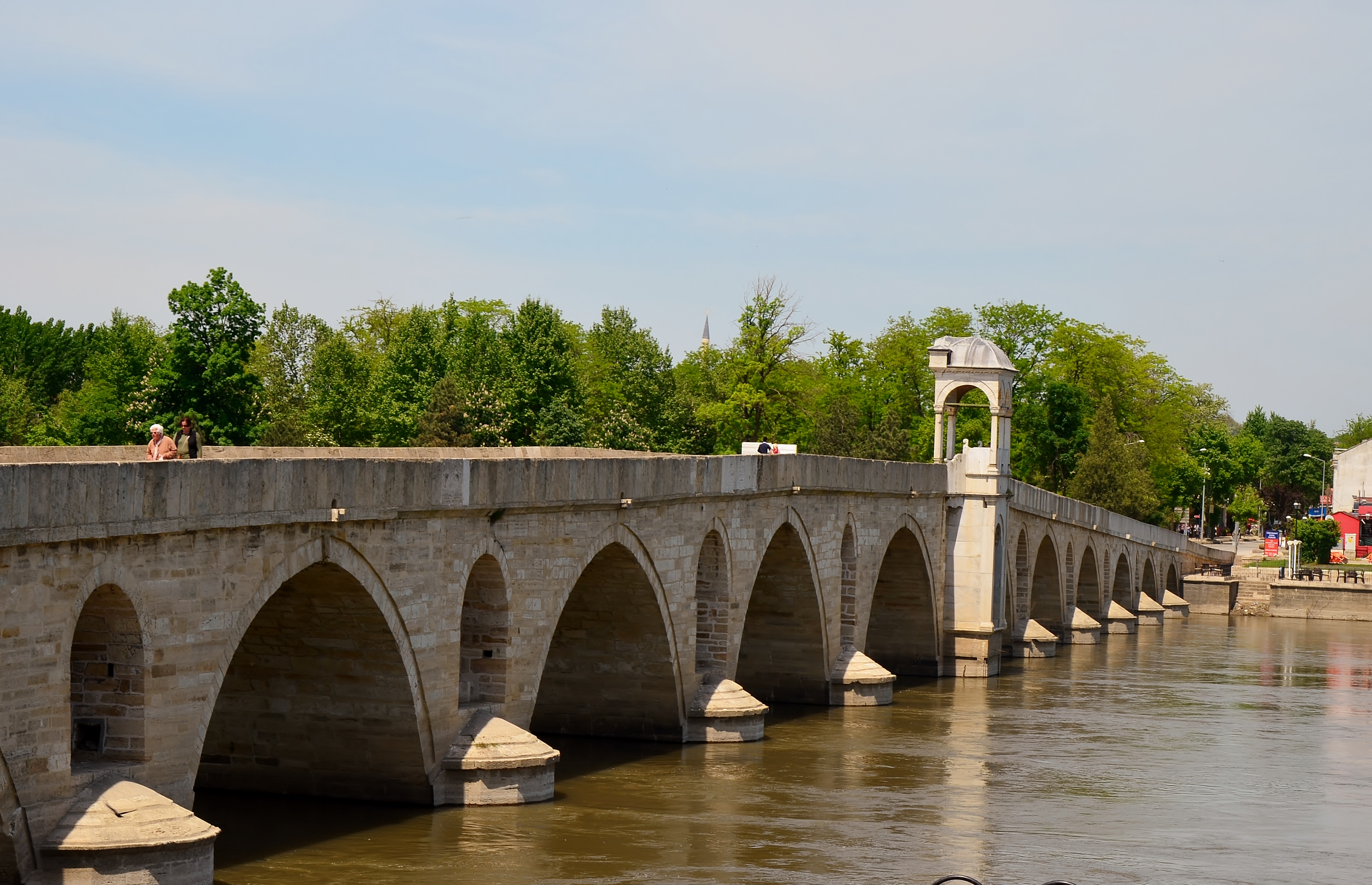
Meriç Bridge

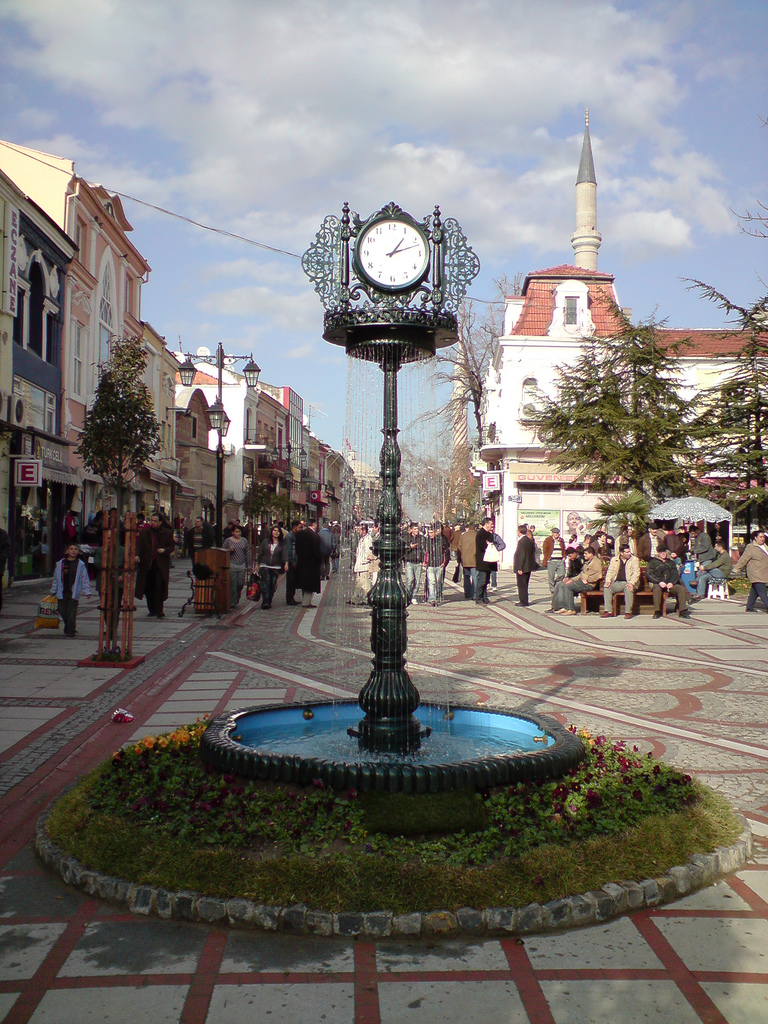
Edirne Main Street

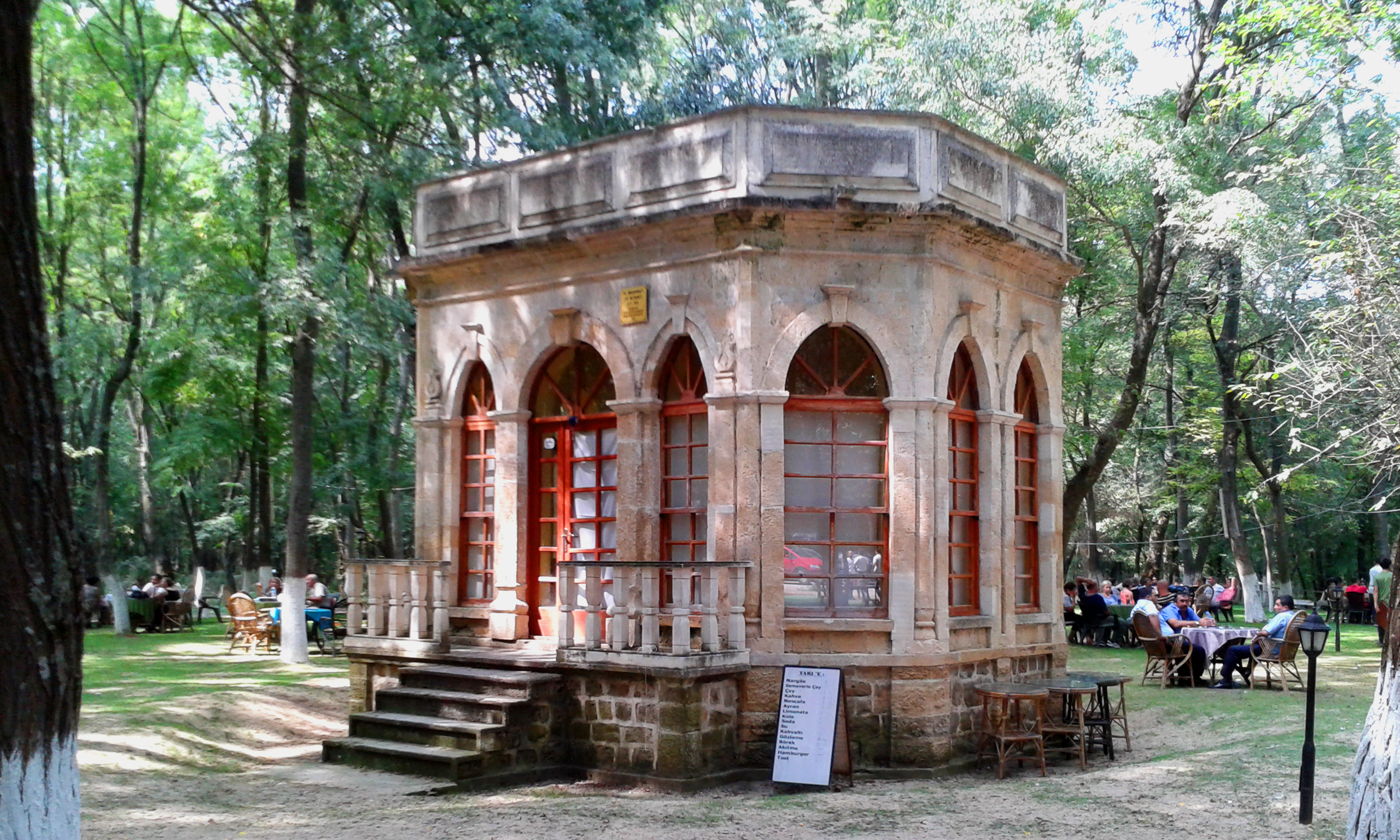
Mehmet IV Hunting Lodge

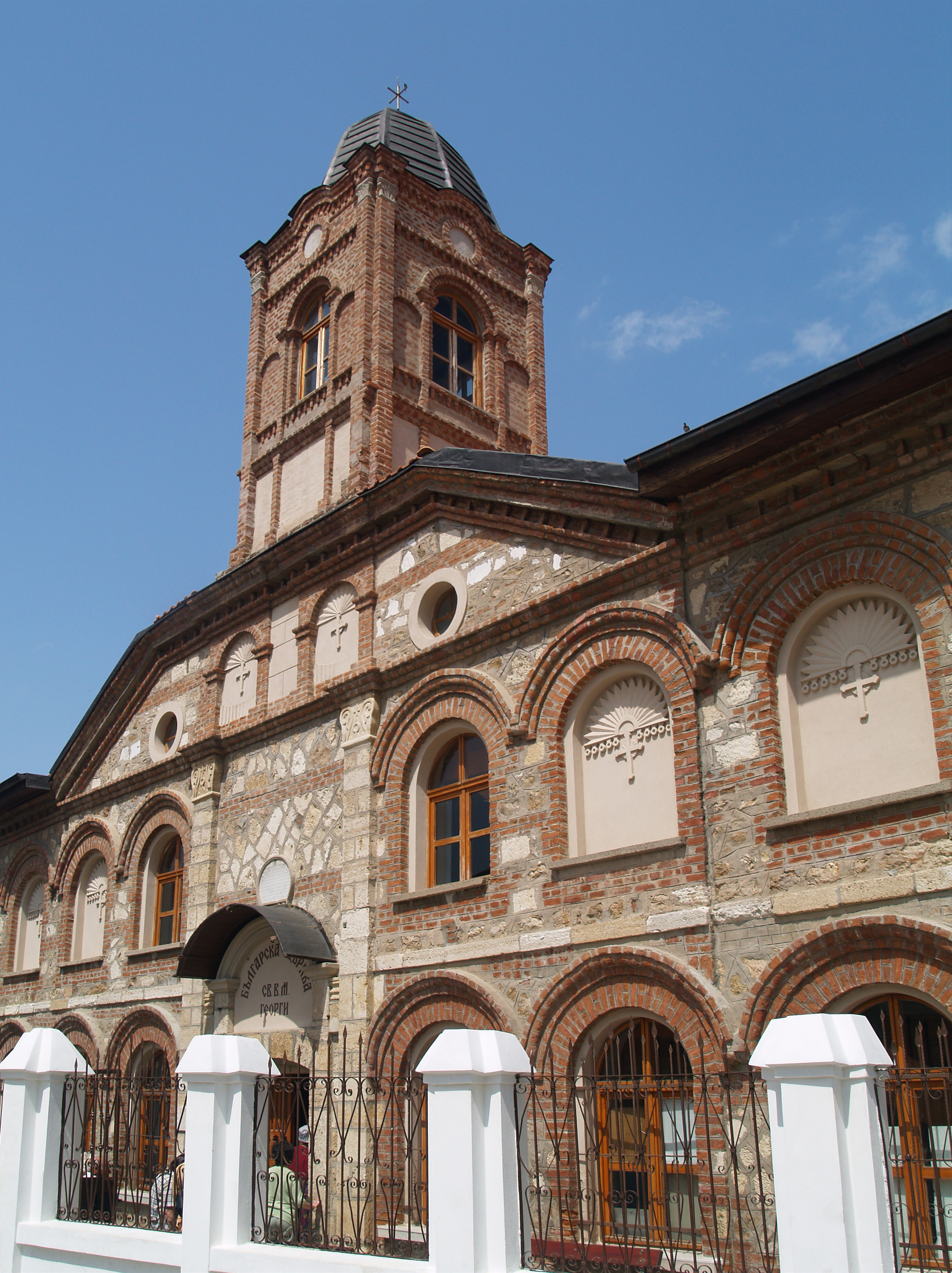
St. George Bulgarian church, Edirne

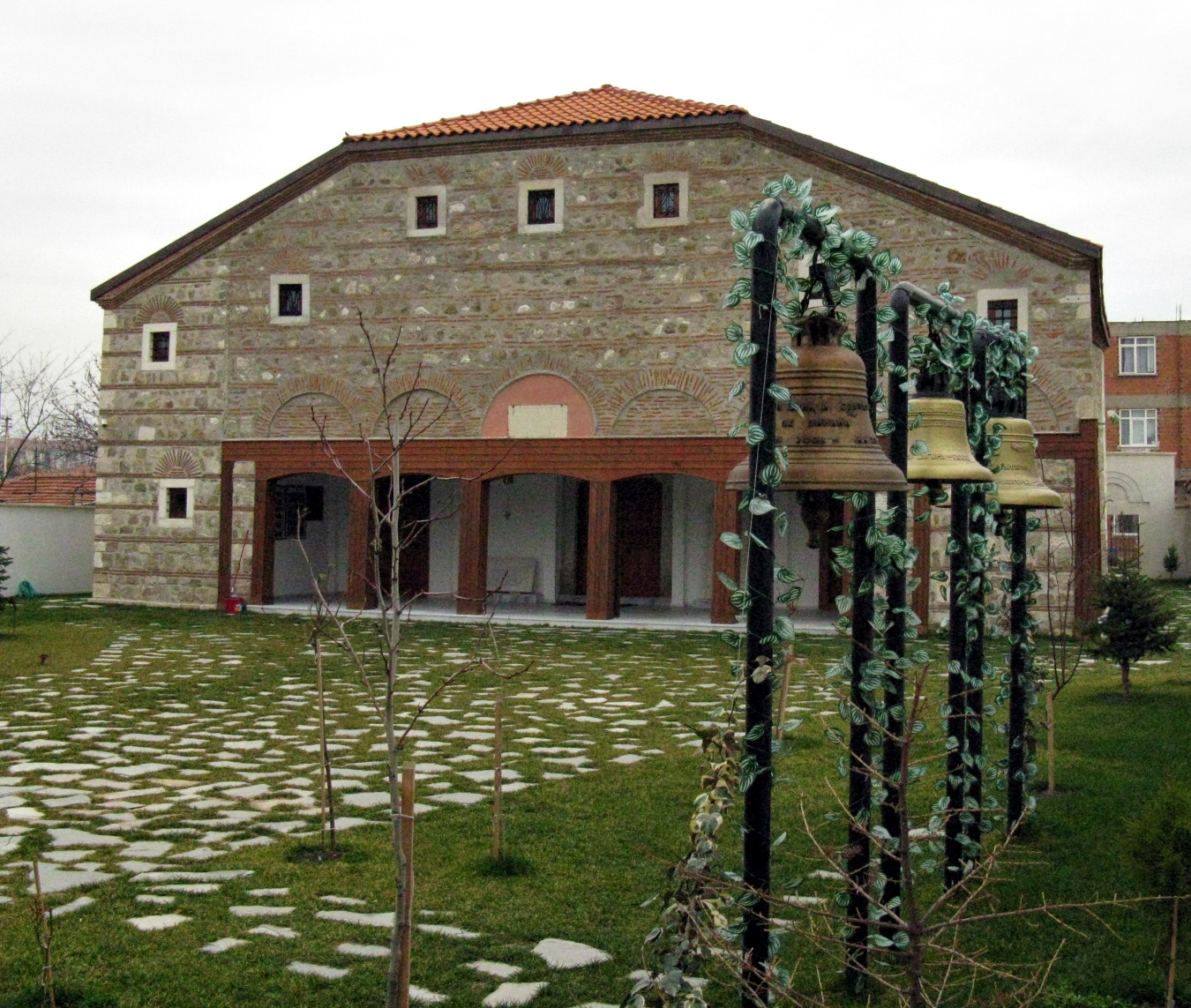
Sts. Constantine and Helena Bulgarian Church

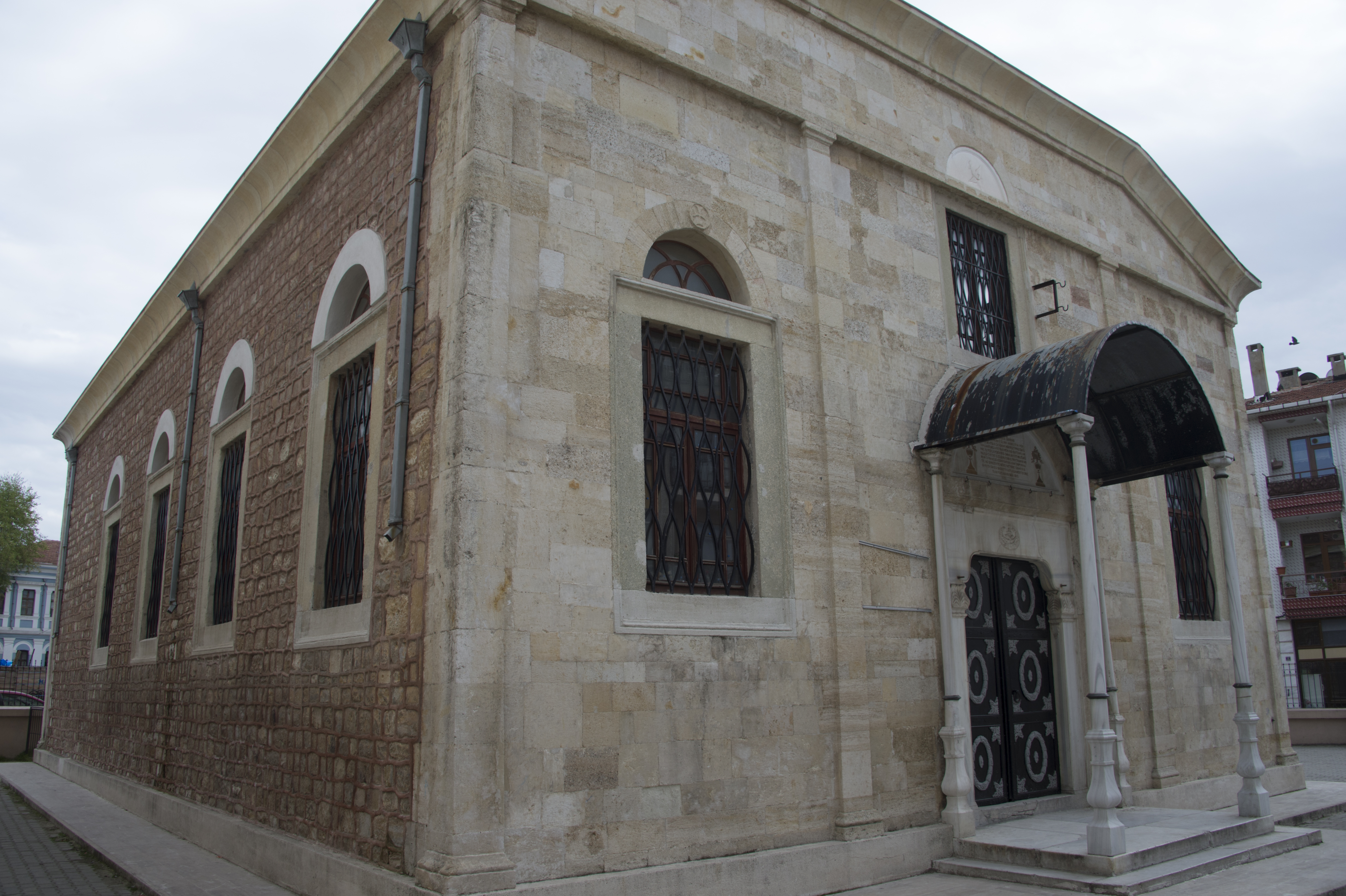
Edirne Italian RK Church dedicated to St. Antonios, also known as St. Anthony of Padua

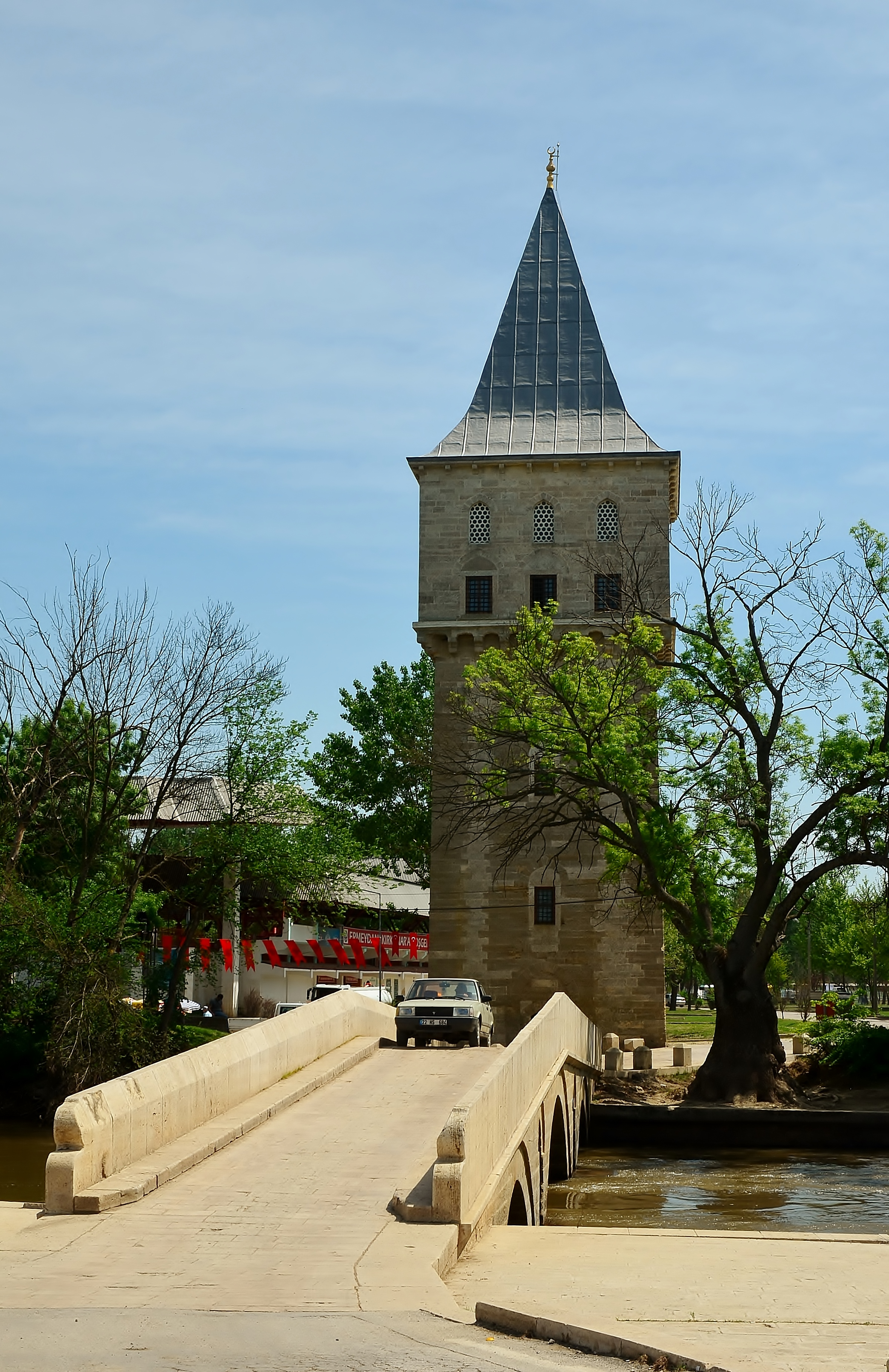
Fatih Bridge over the Tunca River, with the Kasr-ı Adalet (Justice Pavilion) tower in the background

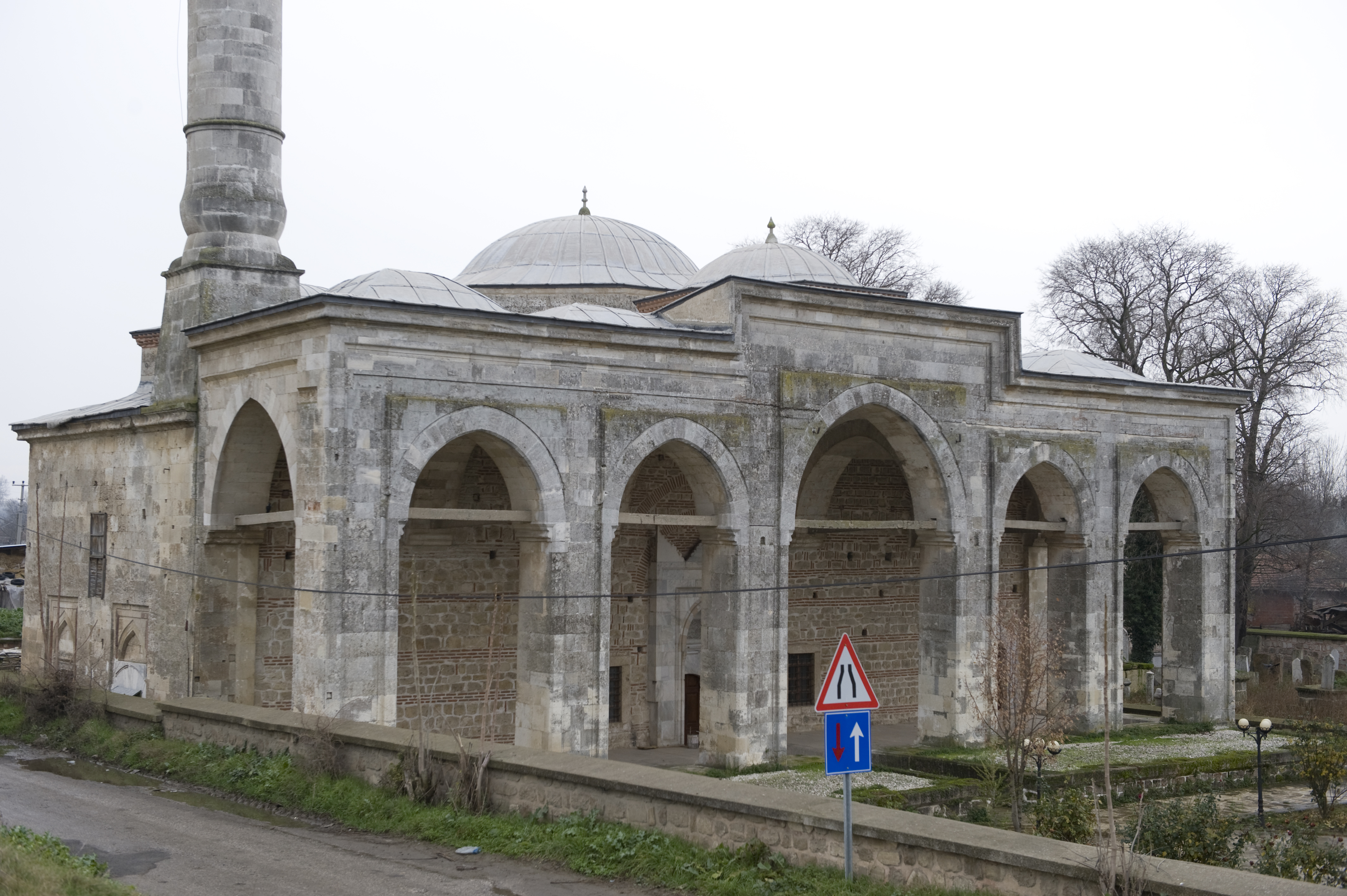
Ghazi Mihal Mosque

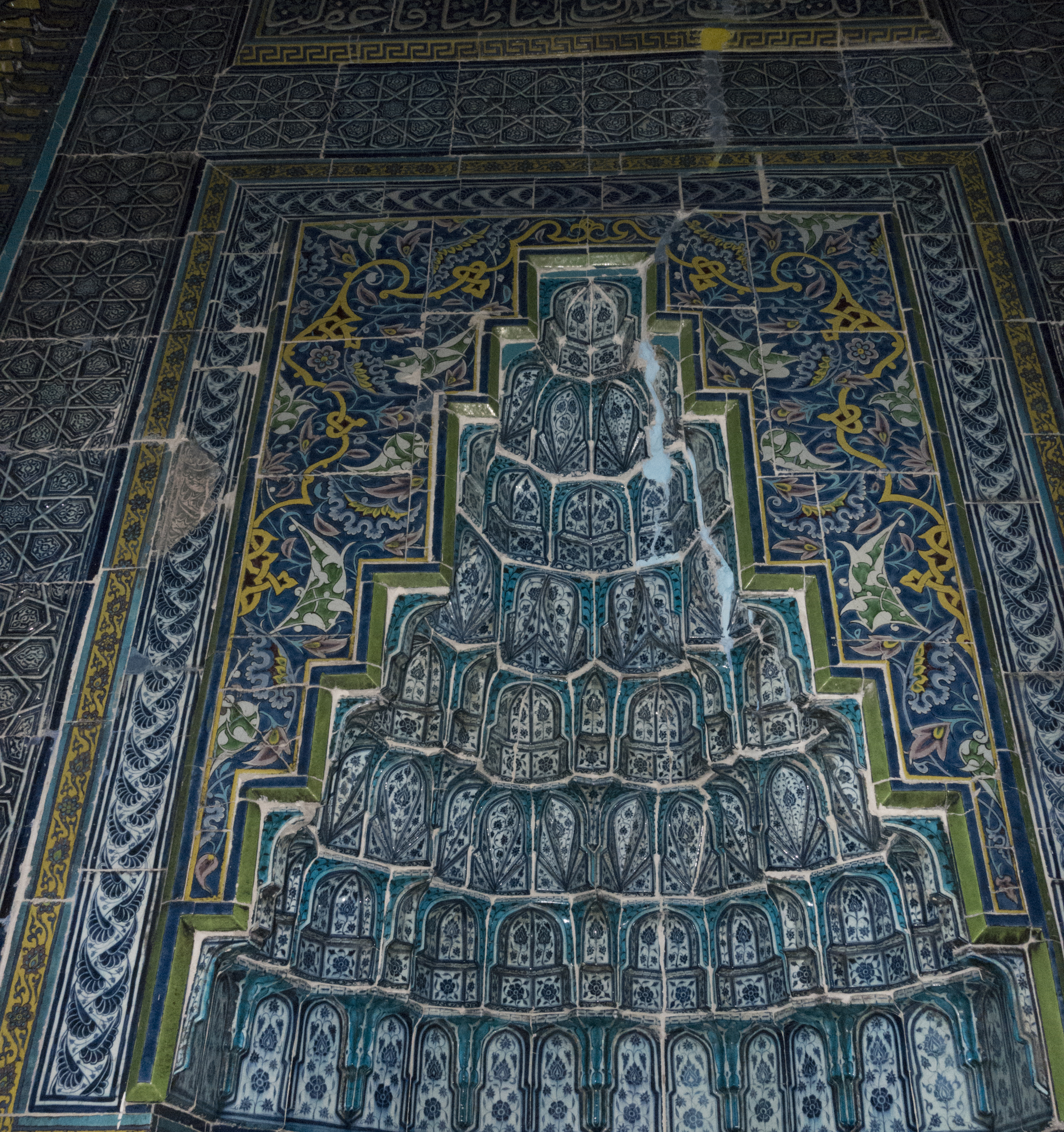
Part of Muradiye Mosque mihrab

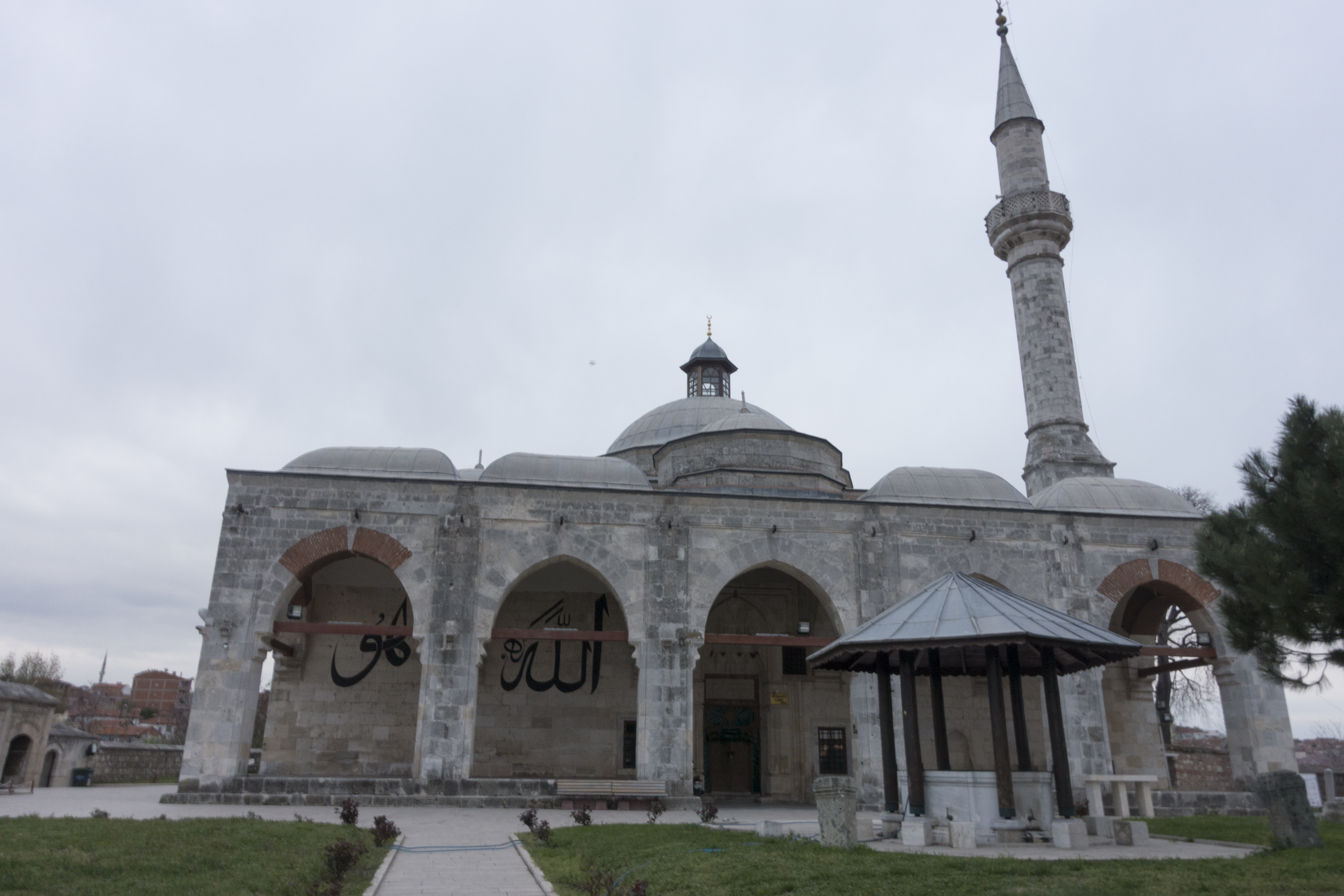
Muradiye Mosque front

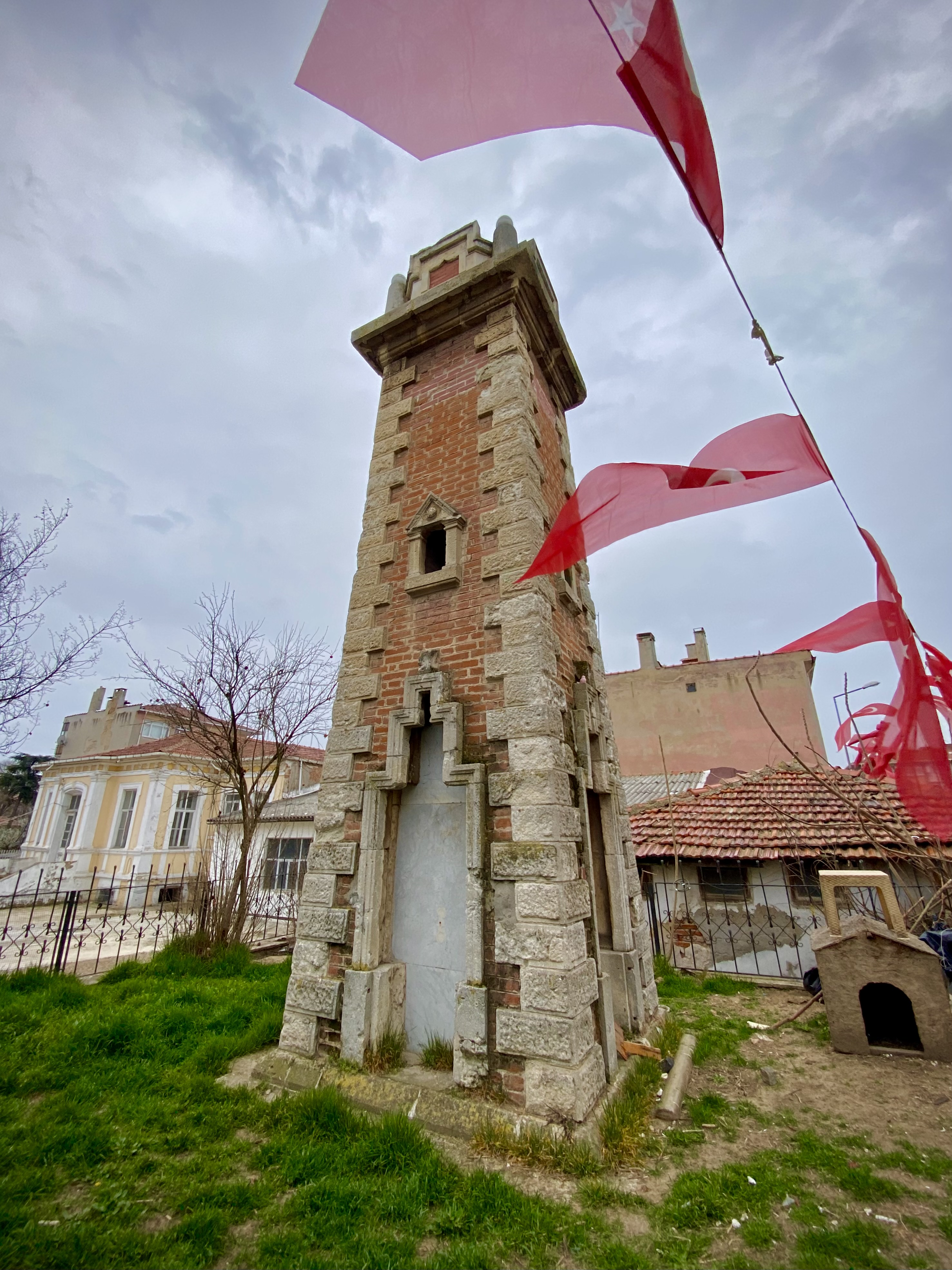
Maarif Su Terazisi in Edirne.

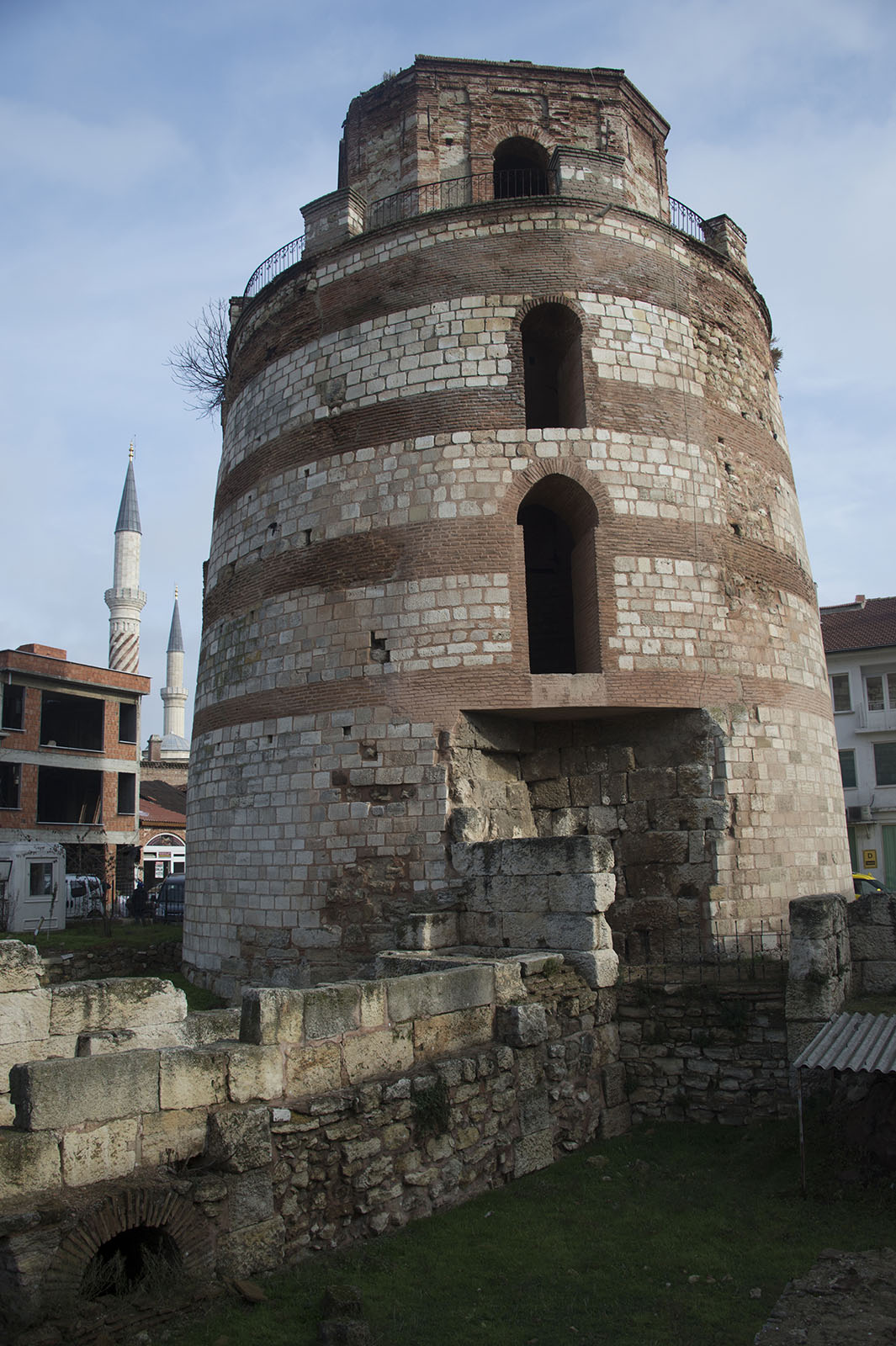
Macedonia Tower, A Roman Tower that was formerly converted into a clock tower that is still standing.

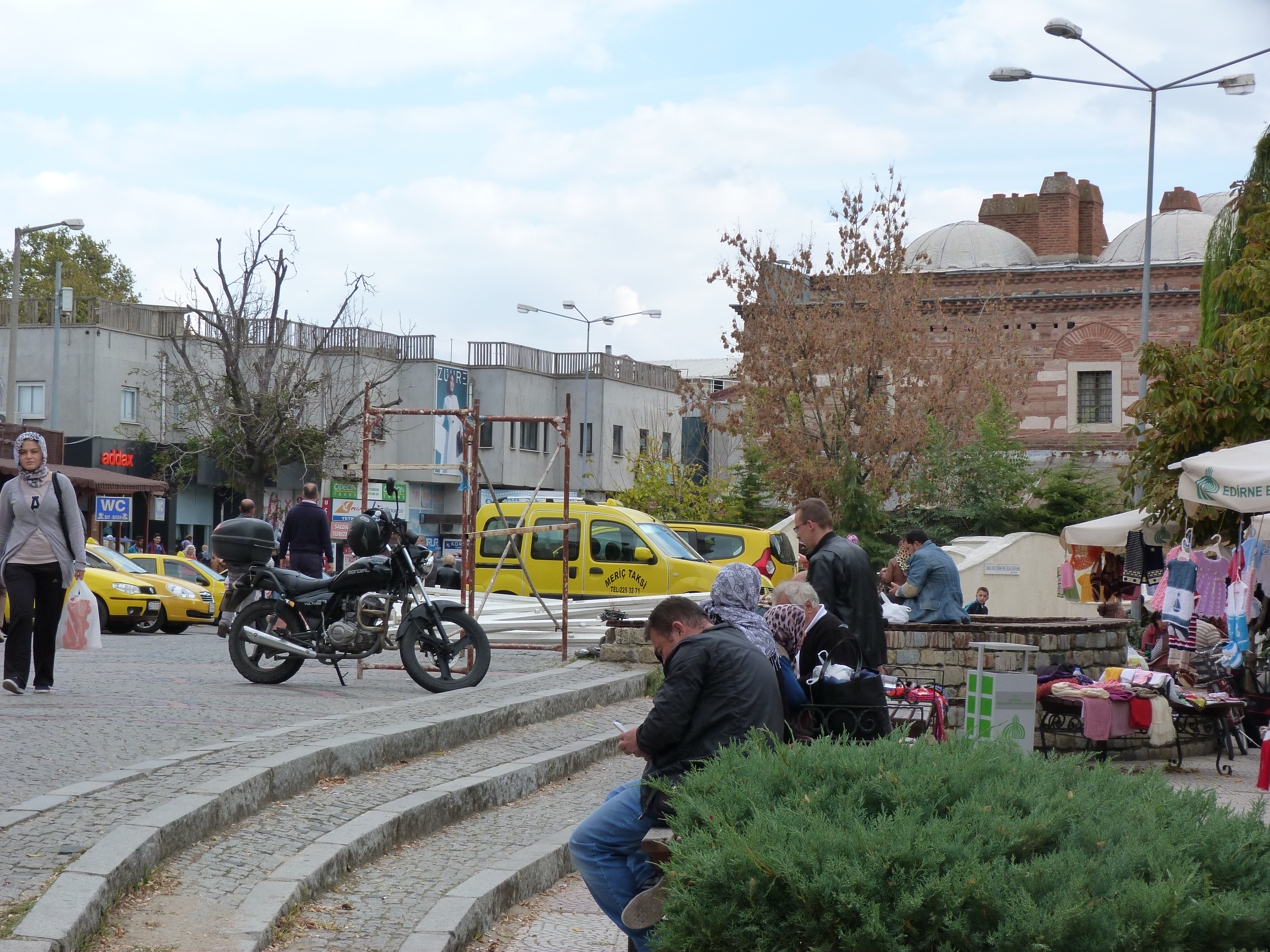
Bazaar

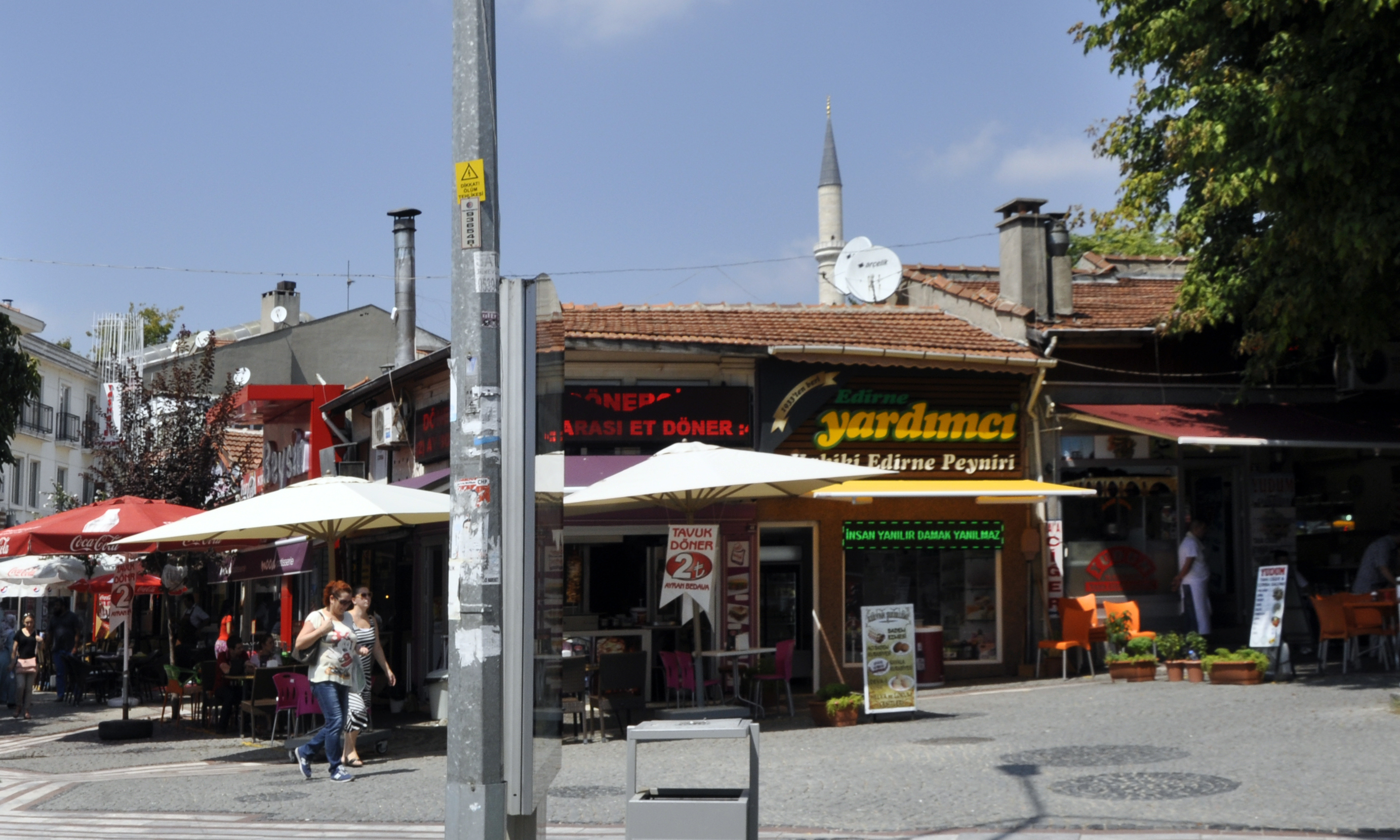
Local shops in Edirne

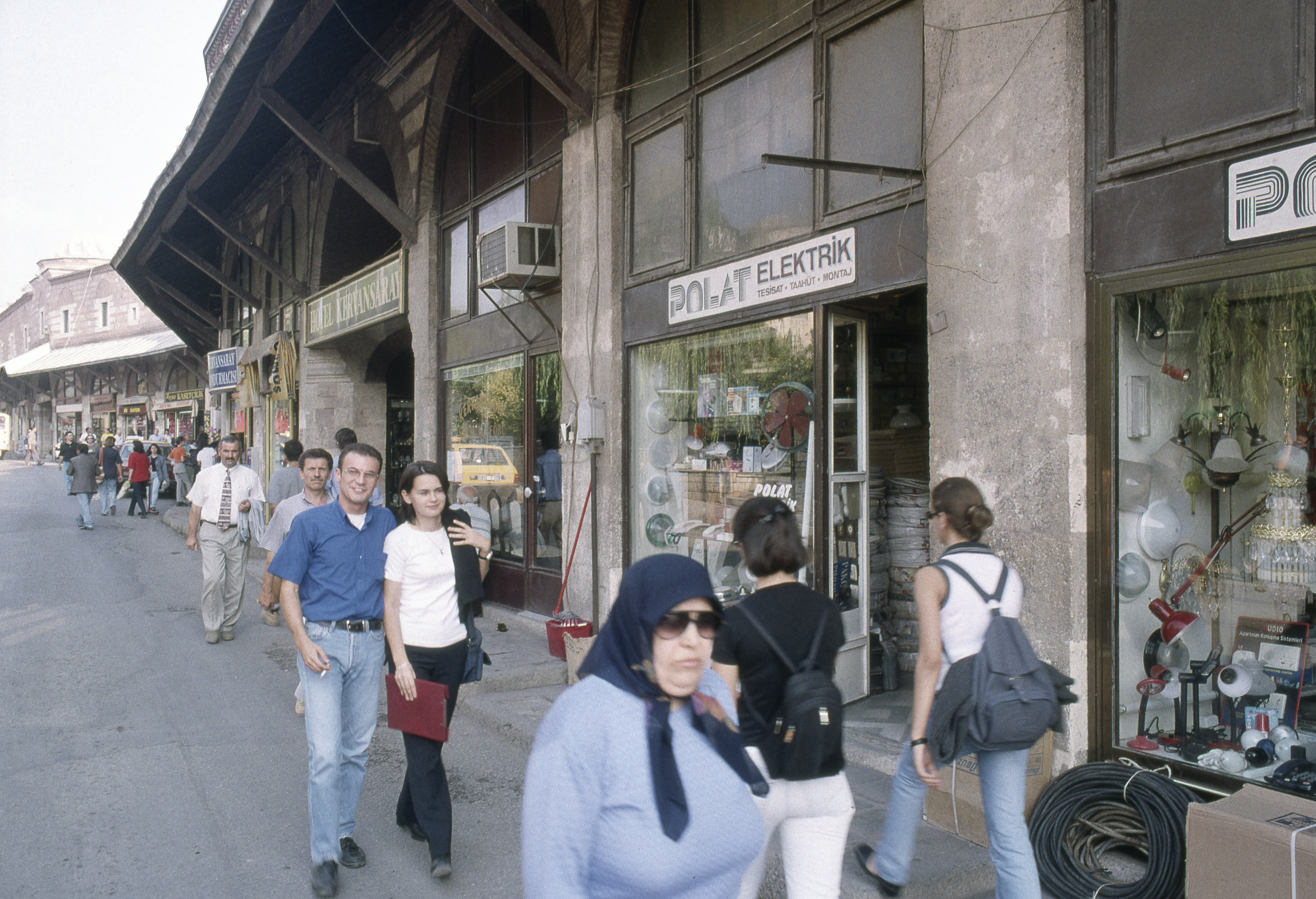
Old town of Edirne in 1999

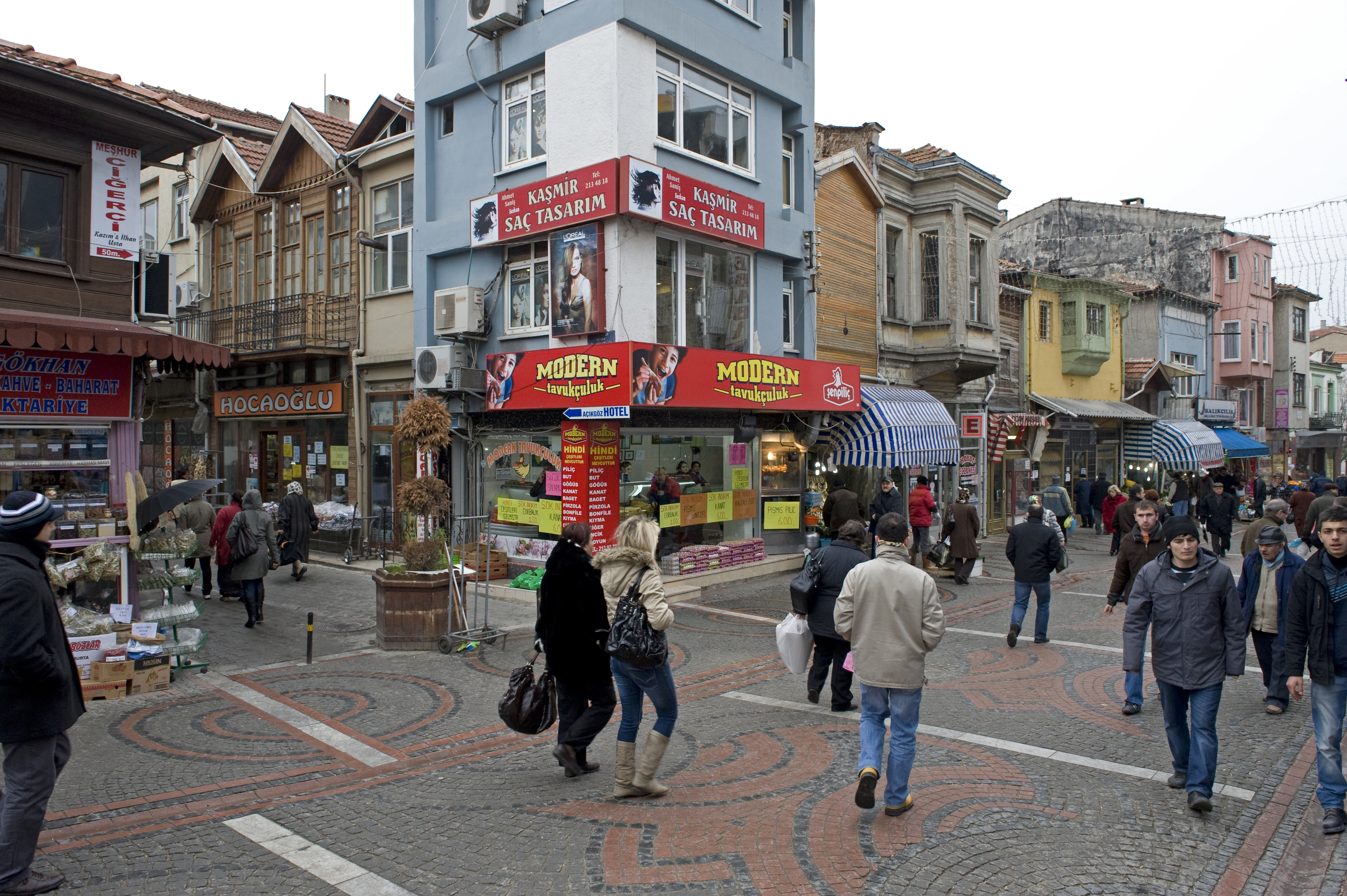
City Center

== Twin cities ==
- Alexandroupolis, Greece
- Ardahan, Turkey
- Bat Yam, Israel
- İzmit, Turkey
- Kars, Turkey
- Lörrach, Germany
- Yambol, Bulgaria
- Gödöllő, Hungary
- Prizren, Kosovo

== Notable people ==
Sultans

- Bayezid I (1360—1403), Ottoman sultan from 1389 to 1402
- Mehmed II (1432–1481), Ottoman sultan from 1444 to 1446 and 1451 to 1481
- Mustafa II (1664–1703), Ottoman sultan from 1695 to 1703
- Mahmud I (1696—1754), Ottoman sultan from 1730 to 1754
- Osman III (1699—1757), Ottoman sultan from 1754 to 1757

Historical

- Caleb Afendopolo (before 1430–1499), Karaite polyhistor
- Athanasius I of Constantinople (1230—1310), Ecumenical Patriarch of Constantinople
- Athanasius V of Jerusalem (died 1844), Greek Orthodox Patriarch of Jerusalem
- Hagop Baronian (1843—1891), Ottoman Armenian writer, satirist, educator
- Elijah Bashyazi (c. 1420—1490), Karaite Jewish hakham
- Theodore Branas, Byzantine general
- Nikephoros Bryennios (ethnarch), Byzantine general
- Abraham ben Raphael Caro, 18th-century Ottoman rabbi
- Karpos Papadopoulos (1790s–1871), Member of the Filiki Eteria
- Anthim the Iberian (1650–1716), Georgian theologian, scholar, calligrapher, philosopher; assassinated by Ottomans in Edirne.
- Theoklitos Polyeidis (1698–1759), Greek scholar, teacher, translator, priest and monk
- Dionysius V of Constantinople (1820–1891), Ecumenical Patriarch of Constantinople
- Joseph Halévy (1827—1917), Ottoman-born Jewish-French Orientalist and traveler
- Abdulcelil Levni (died 1732), Ottoman court painter and miniaturist
- Şahin Giray (1745–1787), last khan of Crimea
- Neşâtî (?–1674), Ottoman poet
- Georgi Valkovich (1833—1892), Bulgarian physician, diplomat and politician
- Yirmisekiz Mehmed Çelebi (died 1732), Ottoman Georgian statesman and ambassador
- Stefanos Koumanoudis (1818–1899), Greek archaeologist, university teacher, writer and translator
- Charles XII, Swedish king who stayed in the city for most of 1713 during his exile in the Ottoman Empire
- Baháʼu'lláh, founder of the Baháʼí Faith, lived in Edirne from 1863 to 1868. He was exiled here by the Ottoman Empire before being banished to the Ottoman penal colony in Akka. Referred to Adrianople in his writings as the "Land of Mystery".

Contemporary

- Cem Adrian (born 1980), Turkish singer-songwriter, author, producer and film director
- Şevket Süreyya Aydemir (1897—1976), Turkish writer, intellectual, economist, historian
- Atılay Canel (born 1955), Turkish football coach
- Cavit Erdel (1884—1933), Ottoman Army officer and Turkish Army general
- Hüsrev Gerede (1884–1962), Ottoman and Turkish Army officer, politician and diplomat
- Avra Theodoropoulou (1880–1963), Greek musician and activist
- Ragıp Gümüşpala (1897–1964), 11th Chief of the General Staff of the Turkish Armed Forces
- Haşim İşcan (1898–1968), Turkish high school teacher, province governor and the first elected mayor of Istanbul
- Kemal Kerinçsiz (born 1960), Turkish ultra-nationalist lawyer
- Özlem Kolat (born 1984), Turkish classical clarinet player
- Michael Petkov (1850–1921), Bulgarian Eastern Catholic priest
- Muharrem Korhan Yamaç (born 1972), Paralympics, world and European champion disabled sport shooter
- Nikos Zachariadis (1903—1973), General Secretary of the Communist Party of Greece

== See also ==
- List of battles of Adrianople
- List of treaties of Adrianople
- Trakya University
