= List of historical mosques in Edirne =

List of historical mosques in Edirne of Turkey.

No	Photo	Name	Year of construction	Other name(s)
1		Alaca Mustafa Pasha Mosque	15th-century	
2		Arif Agha Mosque	15th-century	
3		Atik Ali Pasha Mosque	~1506	
4		Ayşekadın Mosque	1468	
5		Beylerbeyi Mosque	1429	
6		Defterdar Mustafa Pasha Mosque	16th-century	Defterdar Mosque
7		Gazi Hodja Mosque	14th-century	
8		Gazi Mihal Bey Mosque	1422	
9		Hıdır Agha Mosque	15th - 16th-century	
10		İsmail Agha Mosque	15th-century	Baruthane Mosque
11		Kadı Bedrettin Mosque	15th-century	
12		Evliya Kasımpaşa Mosque	1478	
13		Kuşçu Doğan Mosque	15th-century	
14		Lari Mosque	16th-century	Lâleli Mosque
15		Mezit Bey Mosque	15th-century	Yeşilce Mosque
16		Selçuk Hatun Mosque	1456	Selçek Hatun Mosque
17		Sitti Şah Sultan Mosque	1482	
18		Shah Melek Mosque	1428	Şah Melek Pasha Mosque
19		Şehabeddin Pasha Mosque	1436	Kirazlı Mosque
20		Şeyhi Çelebi Mosque	1574	
21		Sarıca Pasha Mosque	15th-century	Saruca Pasha Mosque
22		Yahya Bey Mosque	1577/8	
23		Hersekzâde Ahmet Pasha Mosque	1511	
24		Akmescid Mosque	16th-century	
25		Bademlik Mosque	15th-century	Emir Hüseyin Bey Mosque
26		Balaban Pasha Mescidi	15th-century	
27		Molla Mustafa Pasha Mosque	-	Bürüncüklü Molla Mustafa Pasha Mosque, Kıyıcak New Mosque
28		Bedevizade Ahmed Bey Mosque	-	Alaca Mescidi Mosque
29		Çakır Agha Mosque	1453	
30		Darülhadis Mosque	1435	
31		Old Mosque	1414	Ulu Mosque
32		Hasan Sezai Mosque	1486	Hasan Sezai Gülşeni Mosque
33		Karaağaç Old Mosque	~1920	
34		Kazzaz Salih Mosque	15th-century	
35		Muradiye Mosque	1435	
36		Medrese Ali Bey Mosque	1498	
37		Sofu Beyazıt Mosque	1402	Sarı Selim Mosque
38		Selimiye Mosque	1574	
39		II. Bayezid Mosque	1484	
40		Süle Çelebi Mosque	1559	
41		Süleymaniye Mosque	1458	Süleyman Pasha Mosque
42		Sheikh Shuja Mosque	15th-century	Sücadettin Mosque Şeyh Şüca Mosque
43		Taşlık Mosque	15th-century	Mahmut Pasha Mosque
44		Timurtaş Pasha Mosque	15th-century	Demirtaş Mosque
45		Tamburacılar Mosque		
46		Üç Şerefeli Mosque	1410	
47		Zehr-i Mar Mosque		
48		Yıldırım Bayezid Mosque	15th-century	
