= Arif Agha Mosque =

Arif Agha Mosque may refer to:

- Arif Agha Mosque, Iraq, Historic mosque located in the Rusafa area of Baghdad, Iraq
- Arif Agha Mosque, Turkey, 15th-century Mosque, located at the centre of Edirne, Turkey
