= Balaban Pasha Mosque =

Mosque in Edirne, Turkey

- Balaban Paşa Camii
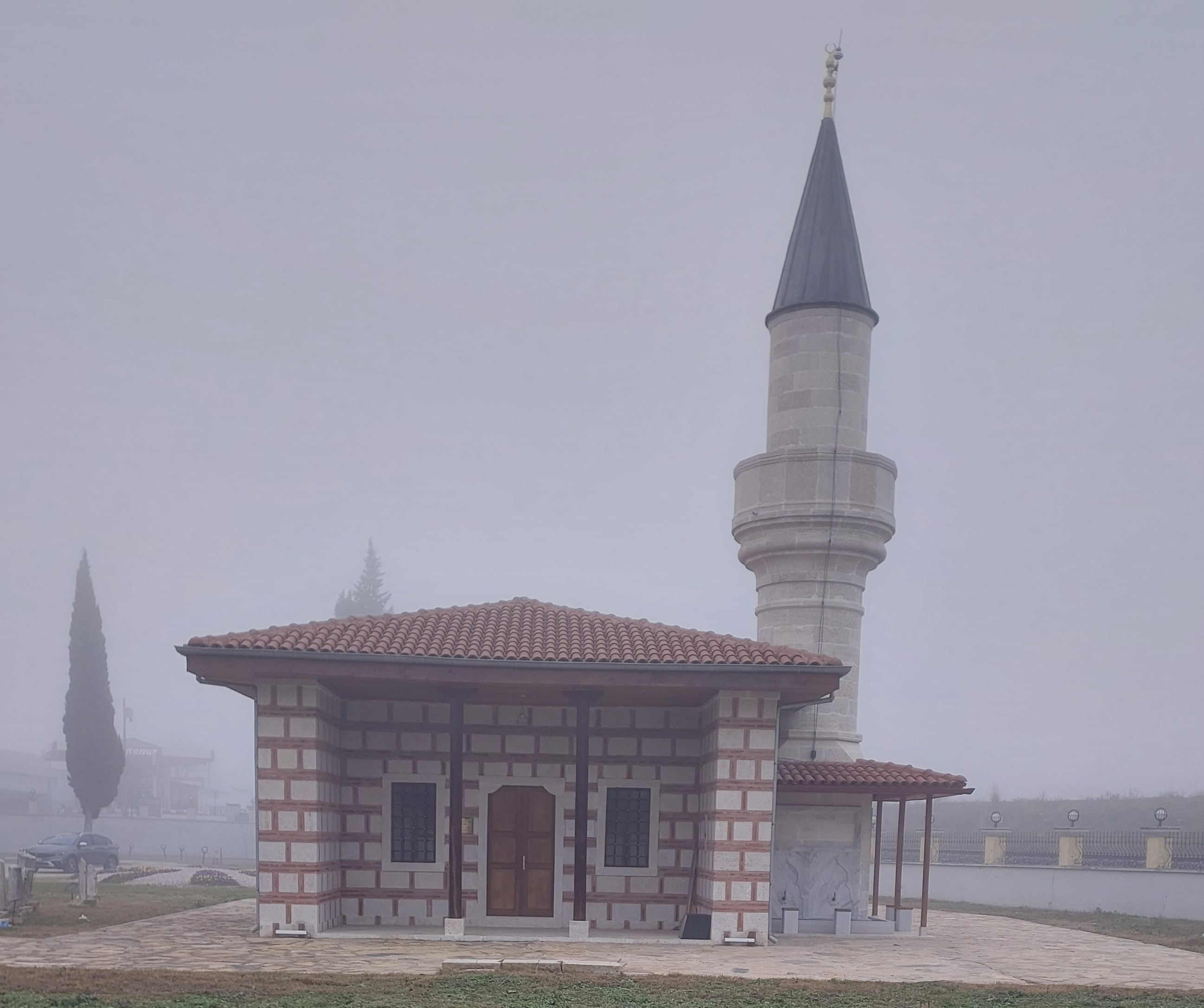

- Location of the mosque in Turkey.

Religion
- Affiliation: Sunni Islam
- Province: Edirne

Location
- Country: Tukey
- Coordinates: 41°40′09″N 26°33′13″E

Architecture
- Type: Mosque
- Style: Ottoman architecture
- Funded by: Balaban Pasha
- Completed: 15th-century
- Minaret: 1
- Type: Cultural

Balaban Pasha Mosque, located in the center of Edirne province, was built in the early 15th century by Balaban Pasha, who served as the Beylerbey of Menteşe and Tokat during the reign of Murad II.

Balaban Pasha also had a soup kitchen built next to the mosque he commissioned. After Balaban Pasha's death, he was buried in the cemetery of the mosque.

The wooden-roofed mosque with one minaret fell into ruin in the 1920s. The stones from the courtyard were used in road construction. In 1926, the Edirne Directorate of Foundations decided to sell the mosque's construction materials as rubble with its decisions numbered 227 and 241, and the materials were sold for 30 lira. The mosque's land was also put up for sale with decision number 78 dated September 28, 1940. On December 16, 1940, with decision No. 88, it was sold to Osman Türkkan, the Edirne Municipality warehouse clerk and central tax collector, for 33 kuruş per square meter. The Balaban Paşa Mosque was rebuilt in 2022.

== See also ==
- List of historical mosques in Edirne
