= Atik Ali Pasha Mosque, Edirne =

Mosque in Edirne, Turkey

Atik Ali Pasha Mosque
- Atik Ali Paşa Camii
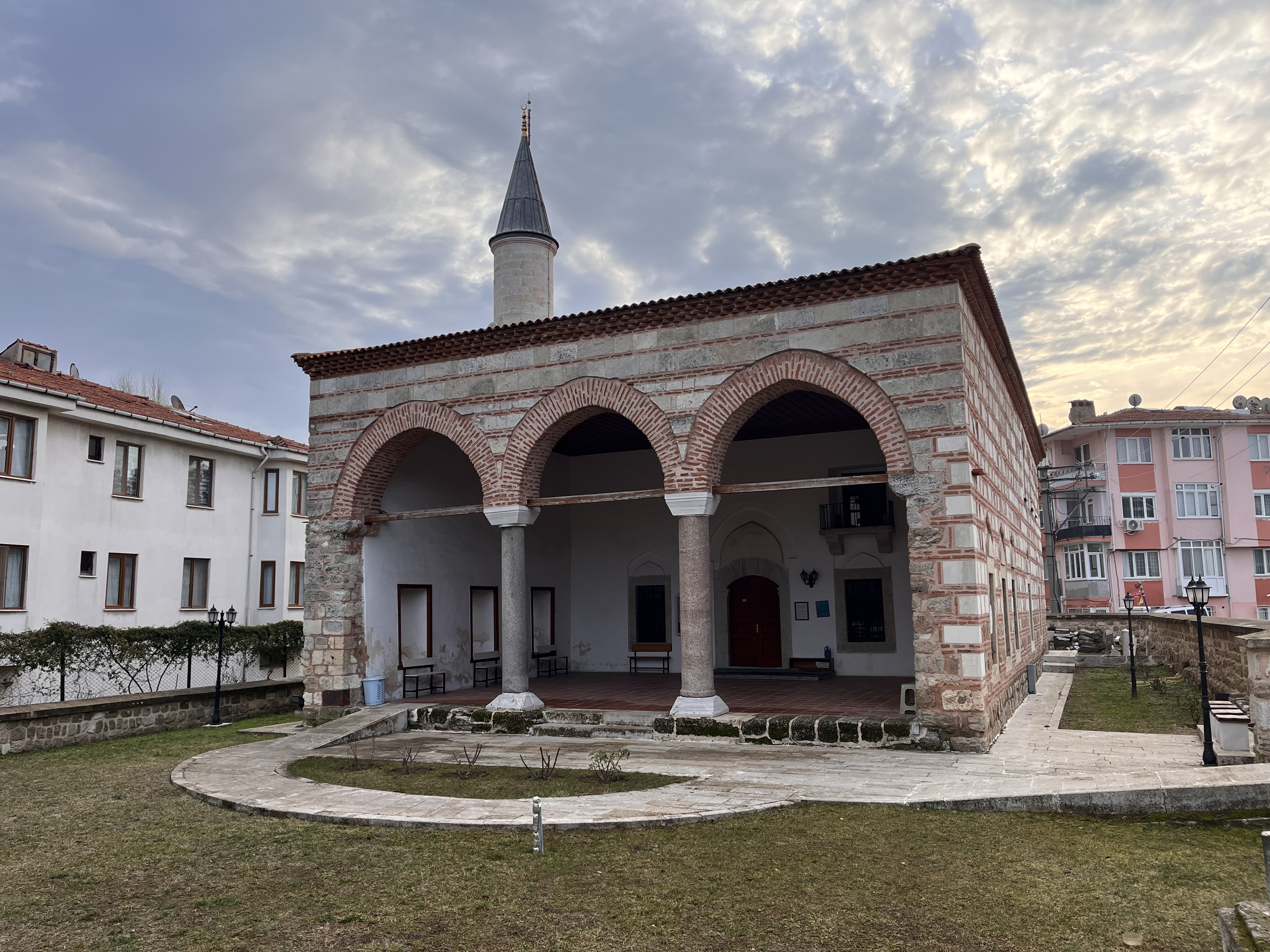

- Location of the mosque in Turkey.

Religion
- Affiliation: Sunni Islam

Location
- Location: Edirne, Turkey
- Coordinates: 41°40′46″N 26°33′40″E

Architecture
- Type: Mosque
- Style: Ottoman architecture
- Completed: ~1506

Specifications
- Height (max): 43 m (141 ft)
- Dome dia. (outer): 31.2 m (102 ft)
- Minaret: 1
- Type: Cultural
- Criteria: i, iv

The Atik Ali Pasha Mosque (Turkish: Atik Ali Paşa Camii) is a mosque in the Meydan neighborhood of Edirne, Turkey.

Located on Atik Ali Pasha Street, about 1.5 km away from Selimiye Mosque, the mosque is open for use today. The mosque, which is under the auspices of the General Directorate of Foundations, was registered under the decision of the Edirne Cultural and Natural Heritage Conservation Board dated 04.07.2003 and numbered 7697.

== History ==
Although the exact date of the mosque's construction is unknown, it is known that it was built by Atik Ali Pasha,[1] one of the viziers of the Bayezid II period. It is thought that the mosque was built before this date since Atik Ali Pasha, nicknamed castrated, died in 1506.

== See also ==
- List of historical mosques in Edirne
