= Ayşekadın Mosque =

Mosques in Edirne, Turkey

- Ayşekadın Camii
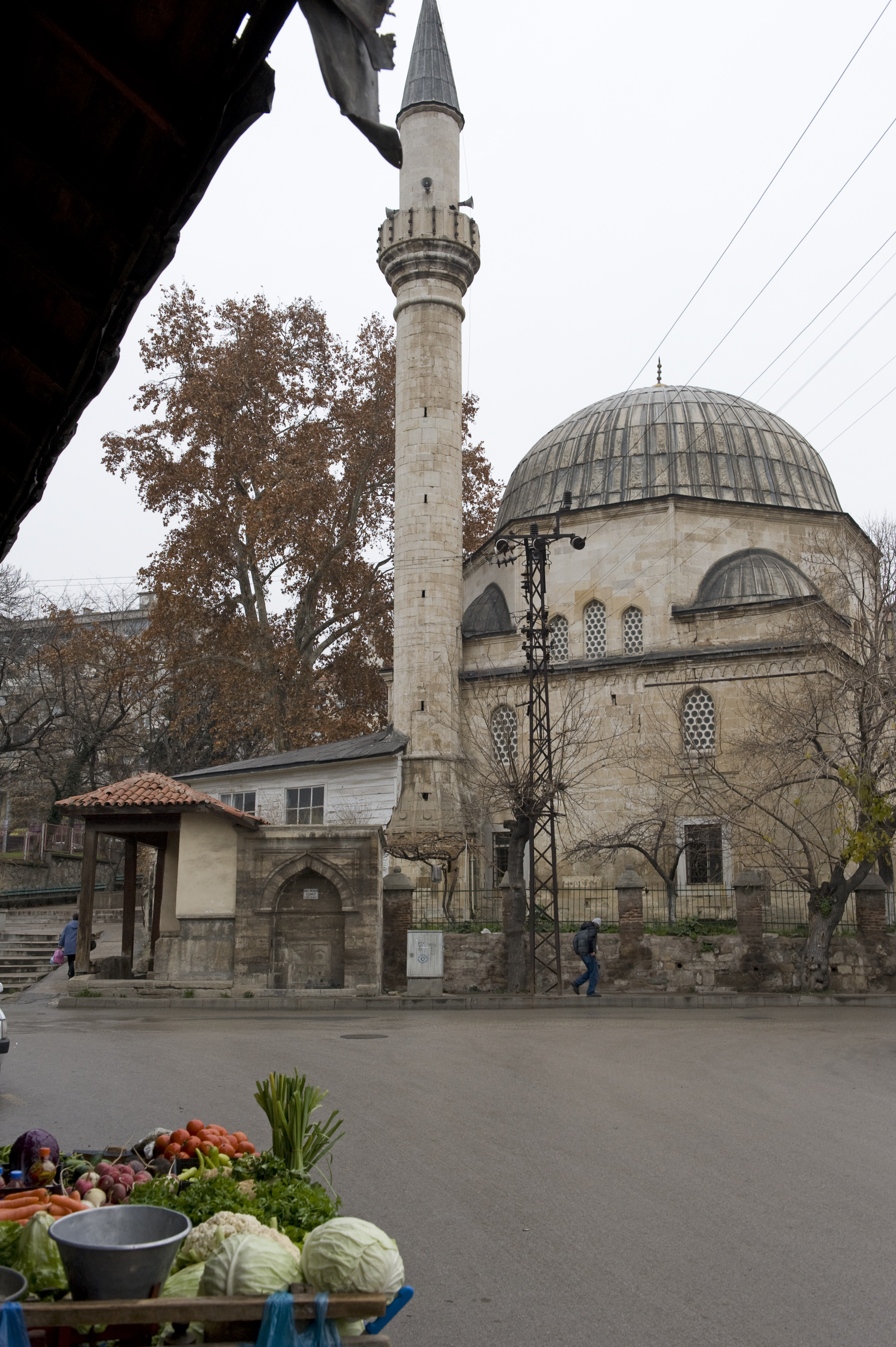

Religion
- Affiliation: Sunni Islam

Location
- Location: Edirne, Turkey
- Interactive map of Ayşekadın Mosque
- Coordinates: 41°40′17″N 26°33′49″E

Architecture
- Type: Mosque
- Style: Ottoman architecture
- Completed: 1468
- Minaret: 1
- Type: Cultural
- Criteria: i, iv

Ayşekadın Mosque, a mosque in the Ayşe Kadın neighbourhood of Edirne.

It was built by Ayşe Hatun, daughter of Mehmed I, in 1468. The ablution taps next to the mosque were built by Hacı Musli in 1647. Bâdî Efendi reported that its dome and minaret were destroyed in the earthquake in Edirne in July 1752, and that the minaret was damaged again in 1889 by a lightning strike.

== See also ==
- List of historical mosques in Edirne
