= Molla Mustafa Pasha Mosque =

Mosque in Edirne, northwestern Turkey

- Molla Mustafa Paşa Camii
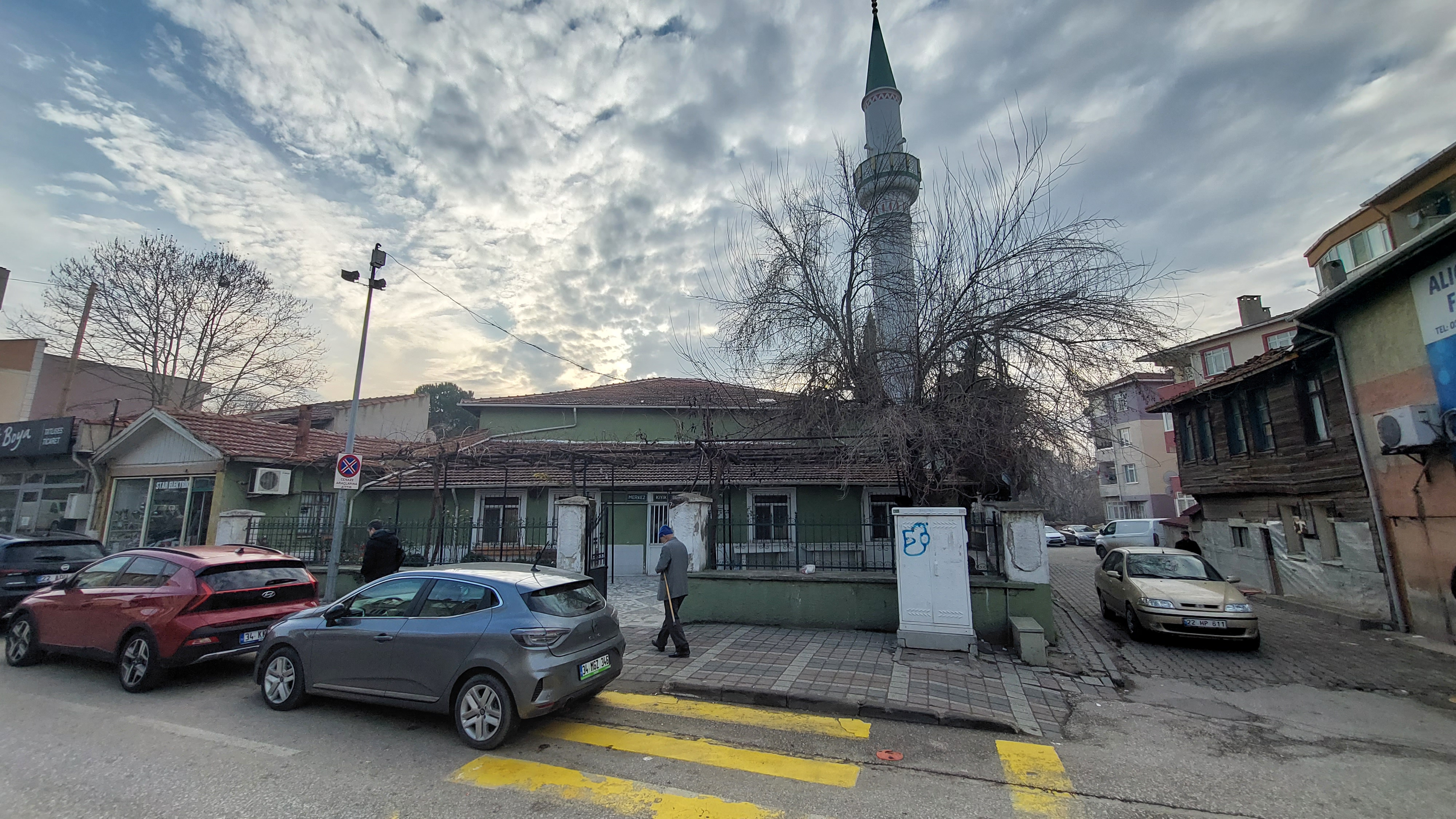

- Location of the mosque in Turkey.

Religion
- Affiliation: Sunni Islam
- Province: Edirne

Location
- Country: Tukey
- Coordinates: 41°40′41″N 26°34′08″E

Architecture
- Type: Mosque
- Style: Ottoman architecture
- Funded by: Molla Mustafa Pasha
- Minaret: 1
- Type: Cultural

Molla Mustafa Pasha Mosque, is a mosque built in the center of Edirne province by the philanthropist İsmail Ağa, a member of the Bürümcükcü guild.

No information has been found regarding the date of construction of the mosque. An inscription above the door of the mosque indicates that it was repaired in 1834. It was rebuilt in 1913. Built with a square plan and a wooden roof within a large garden, the mosque was repaired by the neighborhood residents in 1959.

Sheikh Mehmet Efendi of the Buhari order is buried in front of the mosque's mihrab, and calligrapher Imam Zade Ali's son Seyid Mehmet Efendi is buried in front of the window facing the street. The mosque's minaret is located on the western corner.

== See also ==
- List of historical mosques in Edirne
