= Şeyhi Çelebi Mosque =

Mosque in Edirne, Turkey

- Şeyhi Çelebi Camii
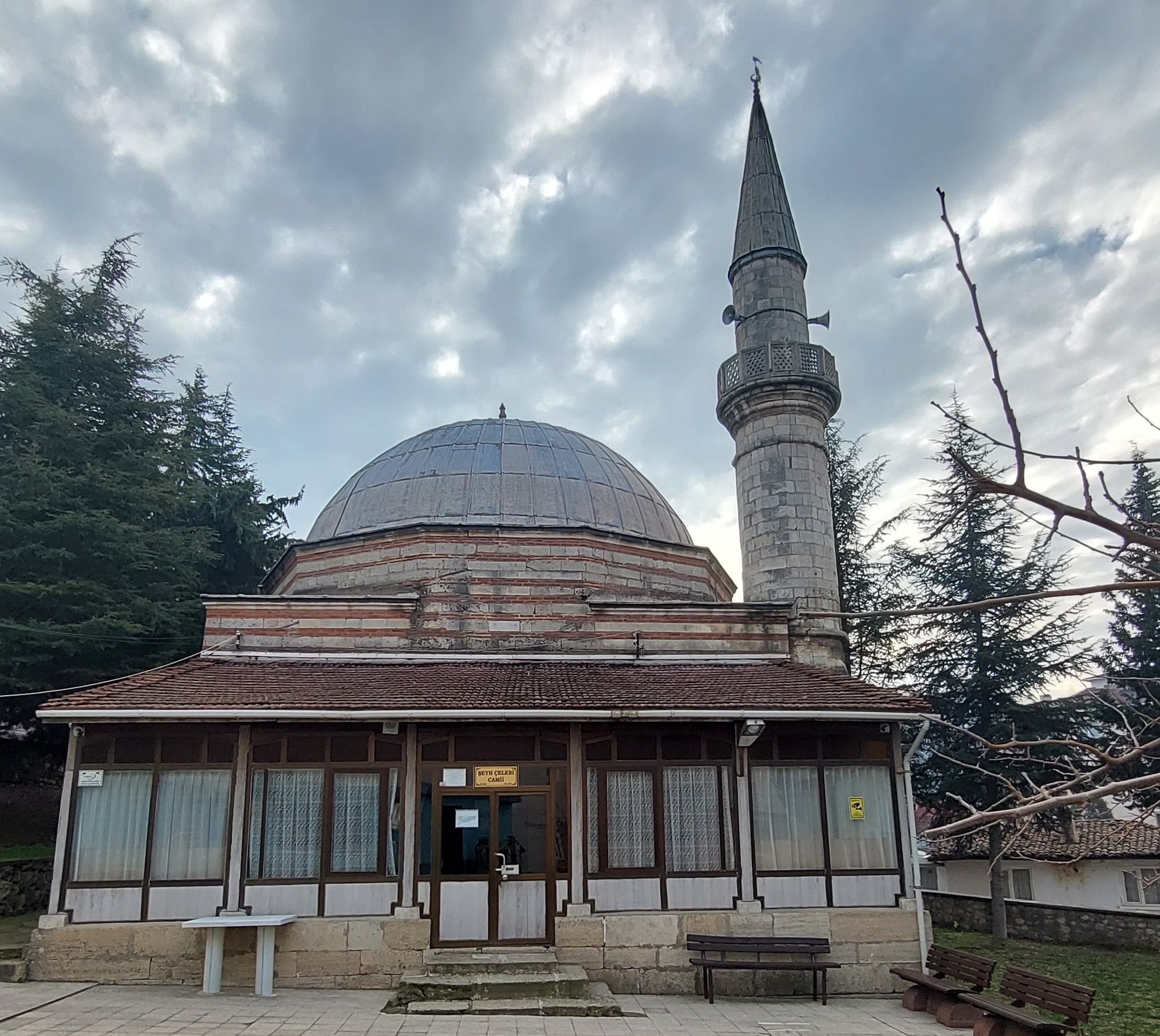

Religion
- Affiliation: Sunni Islam

Location
- Location: Edirne, Turkey
- Interactive map of Şeyhi Çelebi Mosque
- Coordinates: 41.6726°N 26.5683°E

Architecture
- Architect: Mimar Sinan
- Type: Mosque
- Style: Ottoman architecture
- Completed: 1574
- Minaret: 1
- Type: Cultural

Şeyhi Çelebi Mosque is an Ottoman-era mosque located in Edirne, Turkey. It was commissioned by Şeyhi Çelebi, the son of Kadı Bedrettin Mamut Efendi.

It was built by Mimar Sinan following the construction of the Selimiye Mosque. Although the exact date of construction is unknown, it is mentioned as 1574 in a work written by Rıfat Osman. Considering that the Kadı Bedrettin Mosque, built by his father, was constructed in the 1540s, it is likely that it was built towards the end of the 16th century.

It was built with cut stone and brick in an alternating pattern on a square plan. The minaret of the mosque was destroyed when it was hit by a cannonball during the Balkan War. During the 94 invasion, the madrasa section near the mosque was destroyed.
