= Bedevizade Ahmed Bey Mosque =

Mosque in Edirne, Turkey

- Bedevizade Ahmed Bey Mescidi
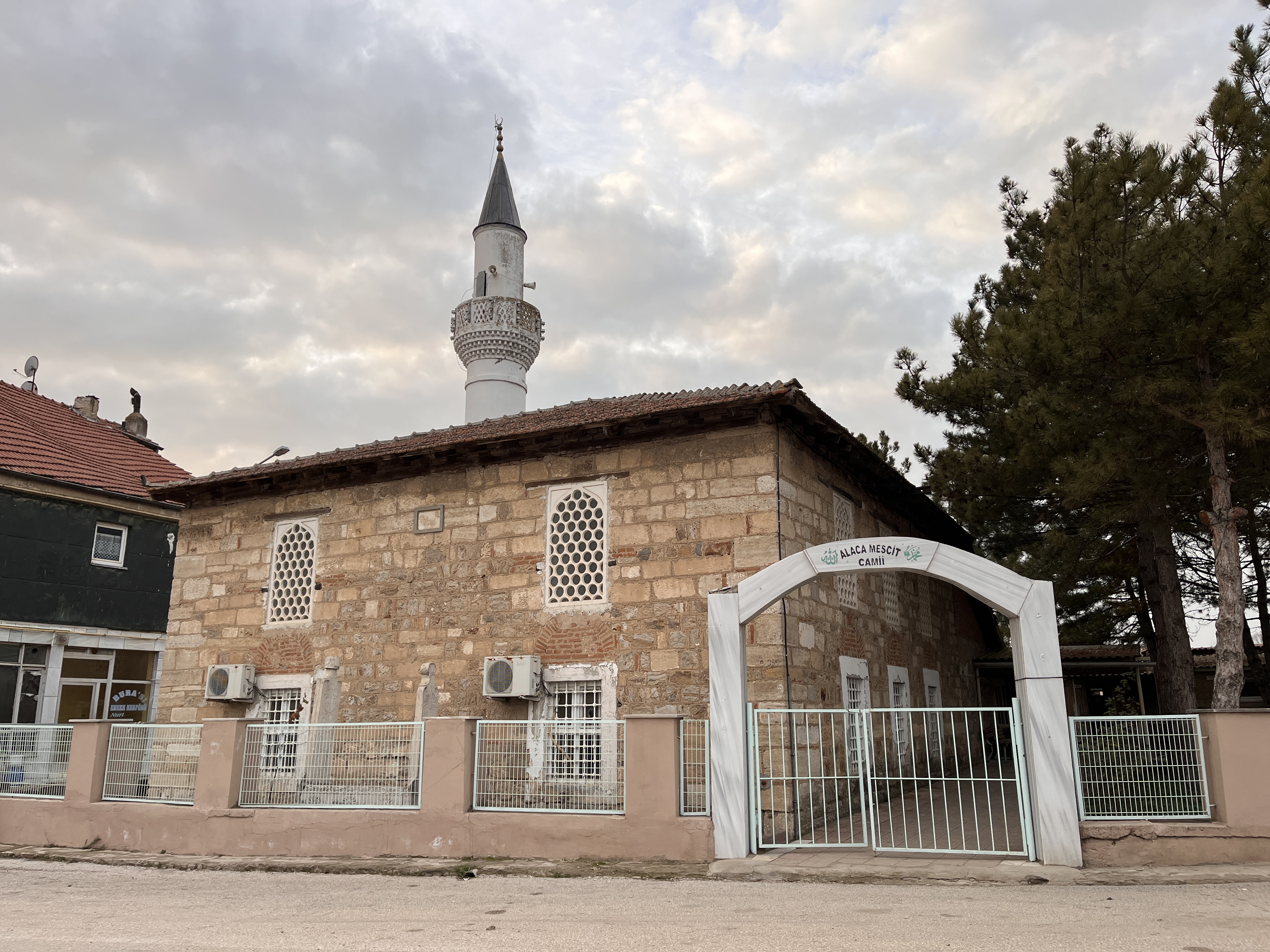

- Location of the mosque in Turkey.

Religion
- Affiliation: Sunni Islam
- Province: Edirne

Location
- Country: Tukey
- Coordinates: 41°41′21″N 26°32′32″E

Architecture
- Type: Mosque
- Style: Ottoman architecture
- Funded by: Balaban Pasha
- Minaret: 1
- Type: Cultural

Bedevizade Ahmed Bey Mosque is a Turkish mosque built by Bedevizade Ahmed Bey in the centre of Edirne province. It is known among the people as Alaca Mosque.

There is no information about the date of construction of the mosque. The mosque was demolished down to its foundations in 1954 and rebuilt, partially faithful to the original.

Thought to have been built in the early Ottoman period, the mosque has a square plan. Covered with a wooden roof, the minaret in the north-west corner of the mosque is made of brick and has a single balcony. [4] Built of roughly hewn cut stone, the mosque has two-storey windows on its facades. There is a cemetery in the mosque's garden.

Owned by the General Directorate of Foundations, the mosque was registered as a Group 1 Monument requiring protection by the Edirne Cultural and Natural Heritage Preservation Board's decision no. 7697 dated 04.07.2003.

== See also ==
- List of historical mosques in Edirne
