= Evliya Kasim Pasha Mosque =

Mosque in Edirne, Turkey

- Evliya Kasım Paşa Cami
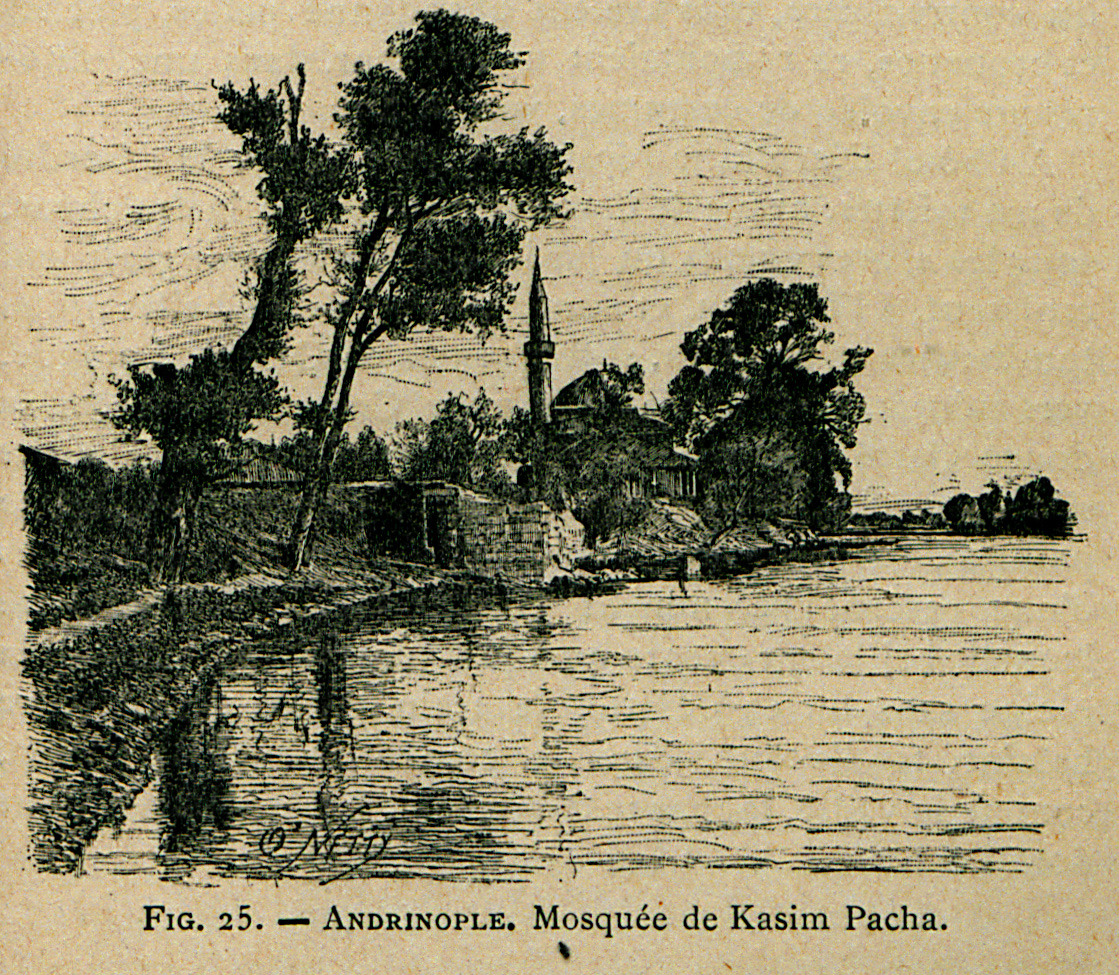

- Location of Evliya Kasim Pasha Mosque in Turkey

Religion
- Affiliation: Islam
- Province: Edirne
- Ecclesiastical or organisational status: Not in use

Location
- Country: Turkey
- Coordinates: 41.66438°N 26.56034°E

Architecture
- Type: Mosque
- Style: Islamic, Ottoman architecture
- Groundbreaking: 1478
- Completed: 1479; 547 years ago

Specifications
- Dome: 1 main dome
- Minaret: 1

Evliya Kasim Pasha Mosque (Turkish: Evliya Kasım Paşa Cami) is a 15th-century Ottoman mosque in Edirne, northwestern Turkey. It is named after Kasim Pasha (fl. 1442–43).

The mosque was built by Kasim Pasha in 1478–1479, the Beylerbey of the Rumelia Eyalet in the Ottoman Empire and a commander of the Ottoman forces during the reign of the sultans Mehmed the Conqueror (r. 1444‒1446, 1451‒1481) and Bayezid II (r. 1481–1512); he was also titled "Evliya", saint. The grave of Kasim Pasha is in the mosque's yard.

== Architecture ==
The mosque is situated in the Kirişhane quarter on the north bank of the Tunca River to the south of the city of Edirne. A masonry staircase with 14 steps was built to enable access to the mosque from the river, but this now has only two steps remaining. Constructed in ashlar, the building with square plan has one dome and one minaret. The façade is directed to the north. Here is the main gate and an outer mihrab flanked by rwo windows. Above the main gate, a construction inscription with a three-line text in Ottoman language, is attached. On each of the other three sides of the building, there are four windows, two in line. The lower windows, in rectangular form, are placed inside niches and have arched gables. Each gable features a carved small five-pointed star. The upper windows are arched, and in the middle of the west wall, a sundial is found.

== Status ==
The mosque has not been in use since 1950 due to its location. It is separated from the city by an artificial levee, which was built to protect the city from flooding by the river, and lack of congregation. Periodically, flooding does further damage to the historic building. In the 2010s, the province governor of Edirne initiated efforts to save the mosque from future ruin. The two projects, to relocate the levee passing between the mosque and the river, or to completely move the mosque to a safe place, have been rejected by the related public bodies so far. Active restoration work finally began in late 2024, the anticipated completion window for the completion of the restoration effort is late 2026.
