= Darülhadis Mosque =

Mosque in Edirne, Turkey

- Dar'ül Hadis Camii
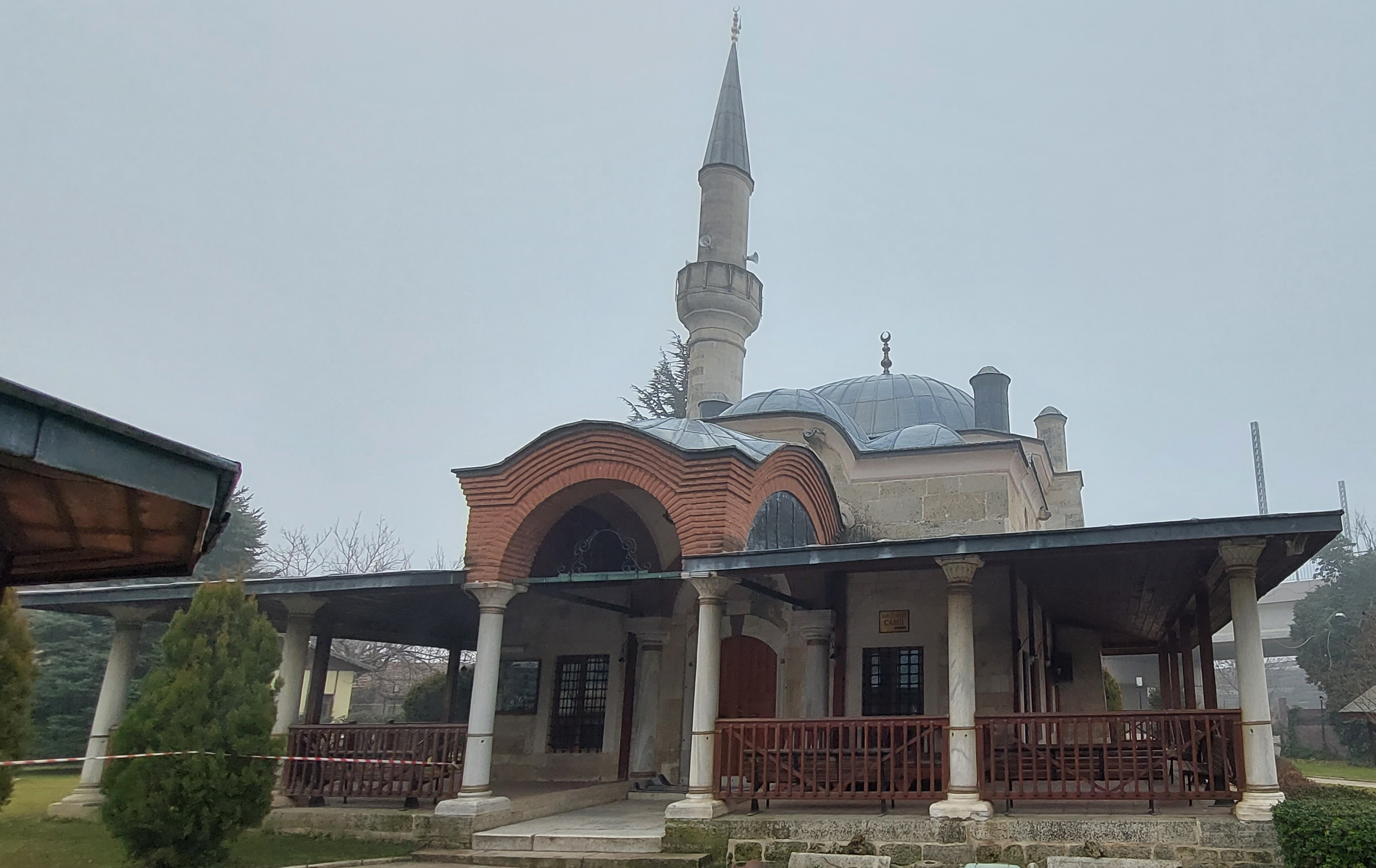

Religion
- Affiliation: Sunni Islam

Location
- Location: Edirne, Turkey
- Interactive map of Darülhadis Mosque
- Coordinates: 41°40′43″N 26°32′56″E

Architecture
- Type: Mosque
- Style: Ottoman architecture
- Completed: 15th century
- Minaret: 1
- Type: Cultural
- Criteria: i, iv

Darülhadis Mosque, a mosque in Edirne, Turkey. It was built in 1435 by Murad II on the banks of the Tunca River. There has been debate as to whether the structure was built as a mosque or a madrasa, and various opinions exist. During the Balkan Wars, its minaret was destroyed by Bulgarian artillery fire. There are two tombs on the qibla side of the mosque. These tombs contain the graves of two sons of Murad II and the children of Mustafa III and Ahmed III.
