= Mezit Bey Mosque =

Mosque in Edirne, Turkey

- Mezit Bey Camii
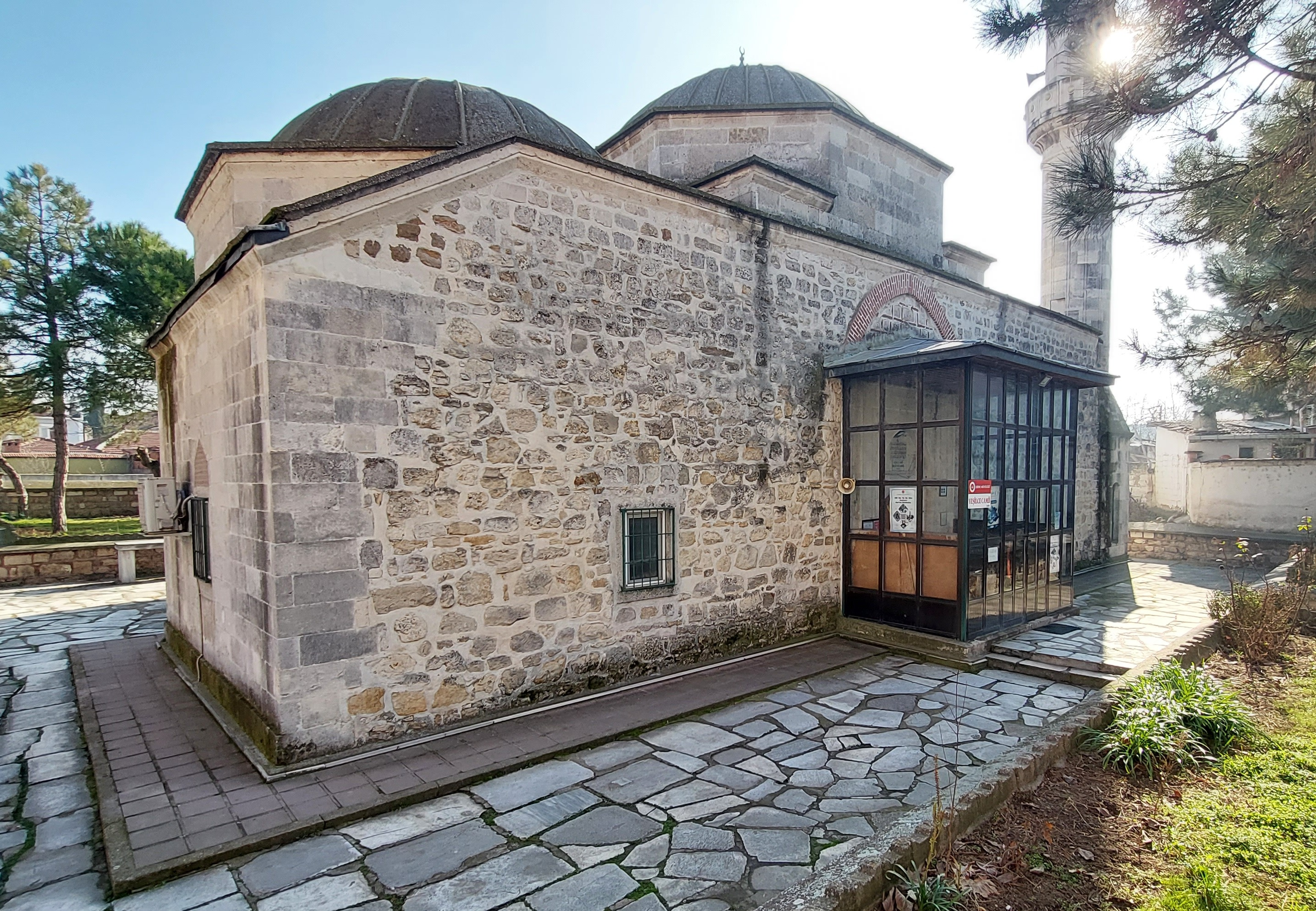

Religion
- Affiliation: Sunni Islam

Location
- Location: Edirne, Turkey
- Interactive map of Mezit Bey Mosque
- Coordinates: 41°39′51″N 26°33′47″E

Architecture
- Type: Mosque
- Style: Ottoman architecture
- Completed: 15th century
- Minaret: 1
- Type: Cultural
- Criteria: i, iv

Mezid Bey Mosque, mosque in the provincial center of Edirne, built in the mid-15th century by Mezid Bey, who served as Alacahisar Sanjak Bey during the reign of Murad II. The signboard at the entrance of the mosque also states that it was built in 1442 by the municipality.

There is an Arabic repair inscription dated 1307 (1889–90) on the entrance door of the mosque located in a large garden. The inverted T-plan mosque is covered with 4 domes.

At the time of its construction, the building was also called Yeşilce Mosque due to the color of the tiles inside the mosque and the fact that the minaret was covered with glazed bricks. These tiles have not survived to the present day due to the earthquake in 1752 and the destruction during the Russian occupation. After the Balkan War, Mezid Bey Mosque, which was in ruins for many years in the middle of the fields after the Balkan Wars, was restored by the General Directorate of Foundations between 1990 and 1991, its ruined minaret was rebuilt and opened for worship.
