= Arif Agha Mosque, Turkey =

Mosques in Edirne, Turkey

Arif Agha Mosque
- Arif Ağa Camii
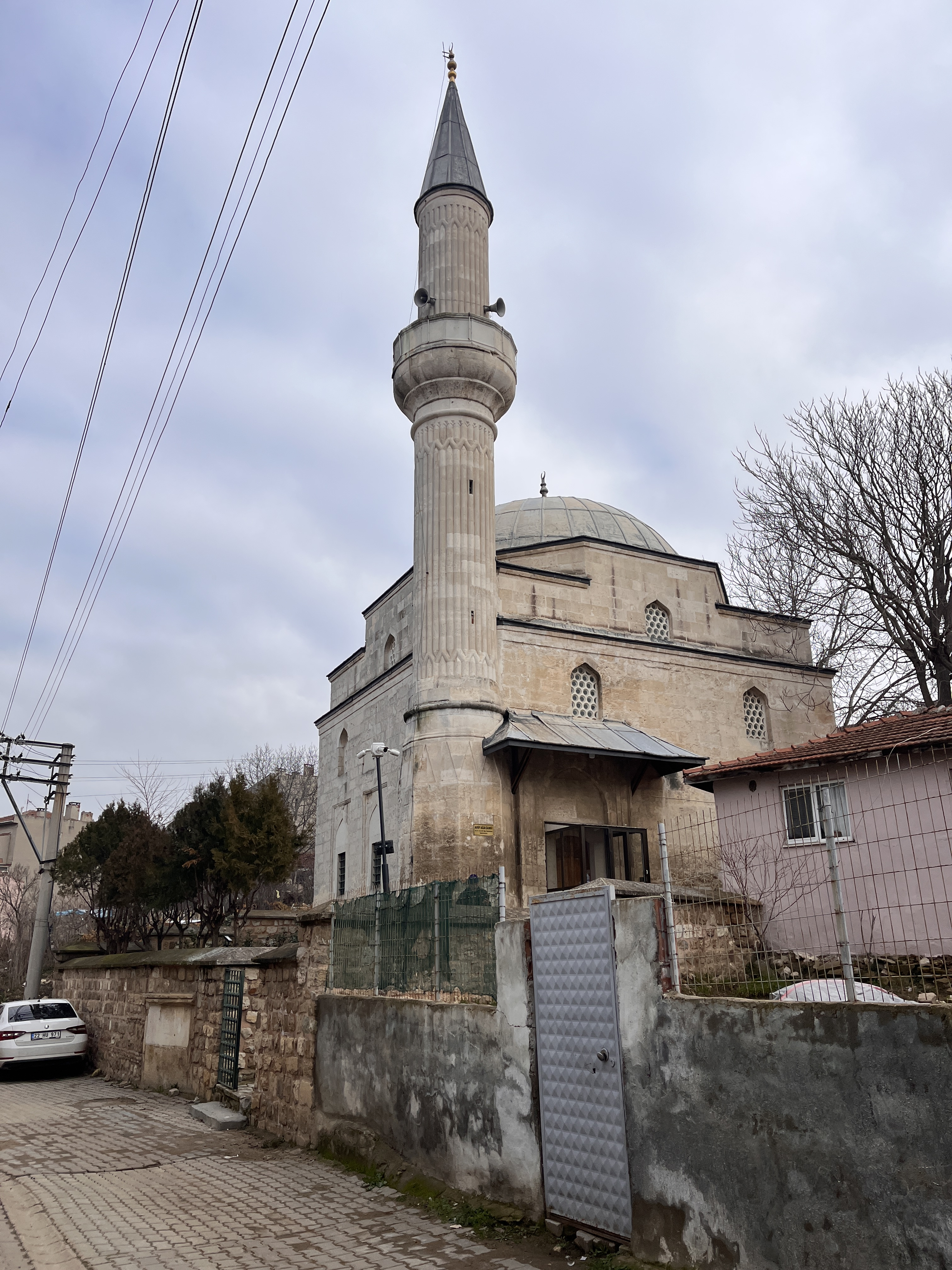

Religion
- Affiliation: Sunni Islam

Location
- Location: Edirne, Turkey
- Interactive map of Arif Agha Mosque
- Coordinates: 41°40′51″N 26°33′12″E

Architecture
- Type: Mosque
- Style: Ottoman architecture
- Completed: ~1506
- Minaret: 1
- Type: Cultural
- Criteria: i, iv

Arif Aga Mosque, a mosque built by Arif Aga in the 15th century, located at the centre of Edirne.

Arif Aga Mosque is popularly known as Künbed Mosque. The mosque, built of cut stone with a square plan, is located on a sloping land from south to north. The minaret of the mosque is in the west corner. The mosque, which was repaired by the regional directorate of foundations in 1992, was reopened for worship in 1993.

== See also ==
- List of historical mosques in Edirne
