= Beylerbeyi Mosque, Edirne =

Mosques in Edirne, Turkey

Beylerbeyi Mosque
- Beylerbeyi Camii
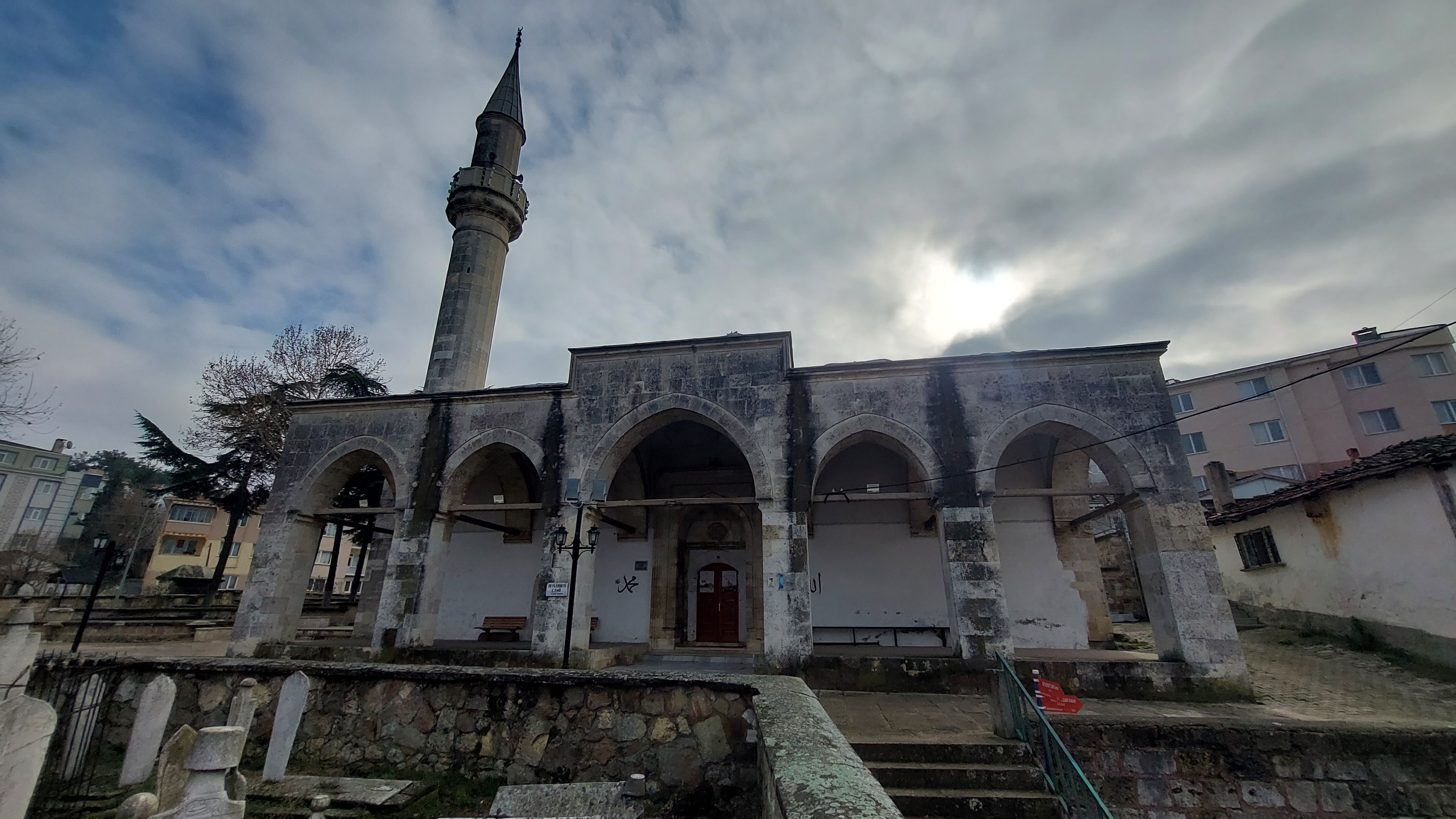

Religion
- Affiliation: Sunni Islam

Location
- Location: Edirne, Turkey
- Interactive map of Beylerbeyi Mosque
- Coordinates: 41°40′58″N 26°33′18″E

Architecture
- Type: Mosque
- Style: Ottoman architecture
- Completed: 1429
- Minaret: 1
- Type: Cultural
- Criteria: i, iv

Beylerbeyi Mosque, a mosque in the central district of Edirne.

Beylerbeyi Mosque was built in 1429 by Sinaneddin Yusuf Pasha, Beylerbeyi of Rumelia. The mosque, which has a polygonal plan and a single dome, is located within the Beylerbeyi Complex. It is an important example among inverted T-plan buildings.
