= Hıdır Agha Mosque =

Mosques in Edirne, Turkey

- Hıdır Ağa Camii
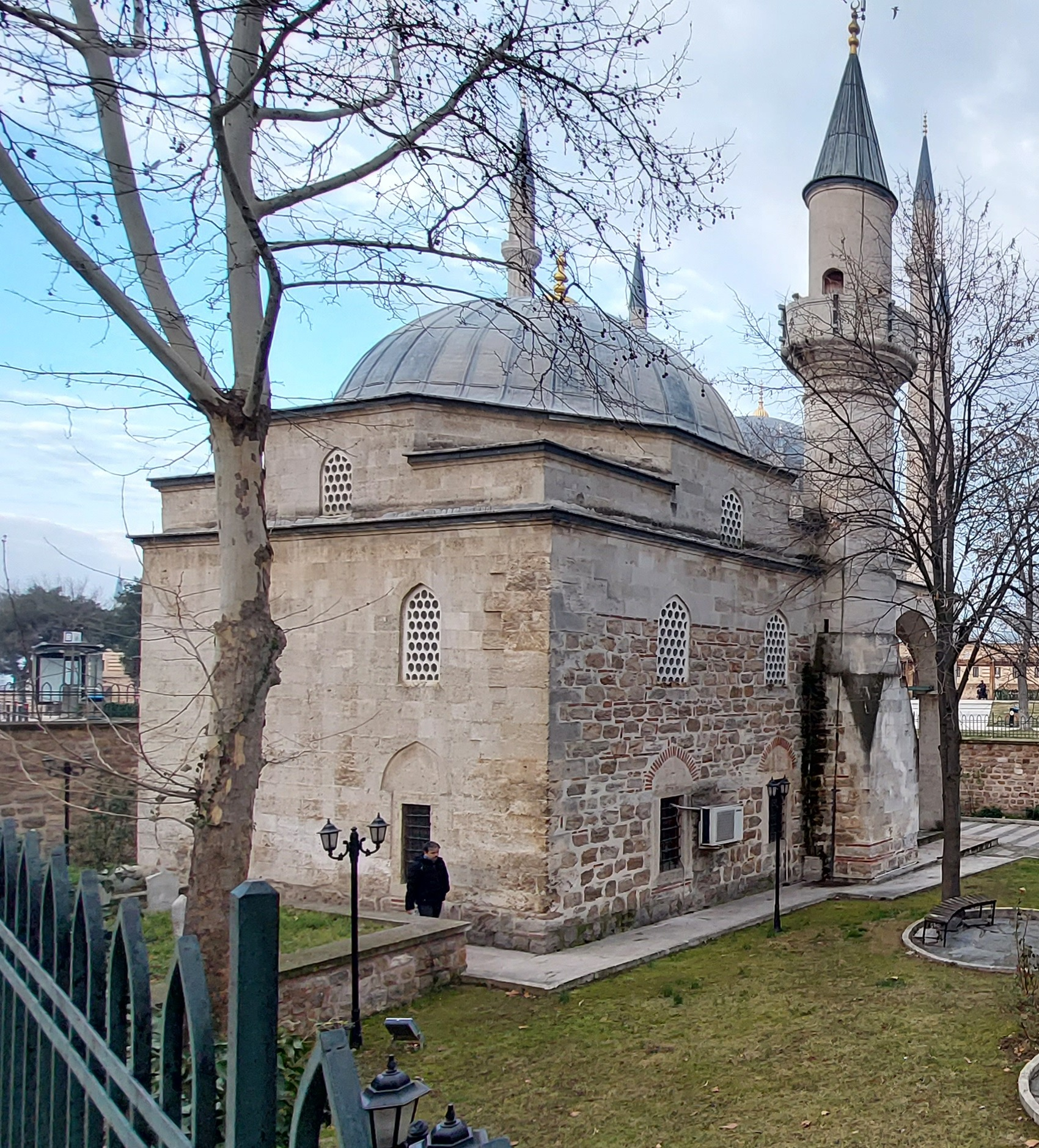

Religion
- Affiliation: Sunni Islam

Location
- Location: Edirne, Turkey
- Interactive map of Hıdır Agha Mosque
- Coordinates: 41°40′38″N 26°33′39″E

Architecture
- Type: Mosque
- Style: Ottoman architecture
- Completed: 15-16th century
- Minaret: 1
- Type: Cultural
- Criteria: i, iv

Hıdır Agha Mosque, mosque built by Hıdır Agha in Edirne during the Ottoman Period.

The construction date of the mosque, which has no inscription, is unknown. According to the sources, the construction date is stated as the 15th or 16th century. The mosque, which is a single-domed building, has been repaired twice, once after the Ottoman-Russian War and once in 1993.
