= Defterdar Mustafa Pasha Mosque =

Mosques in Edirne, Turkey

- Defterdar Mustafa Paşa Camii
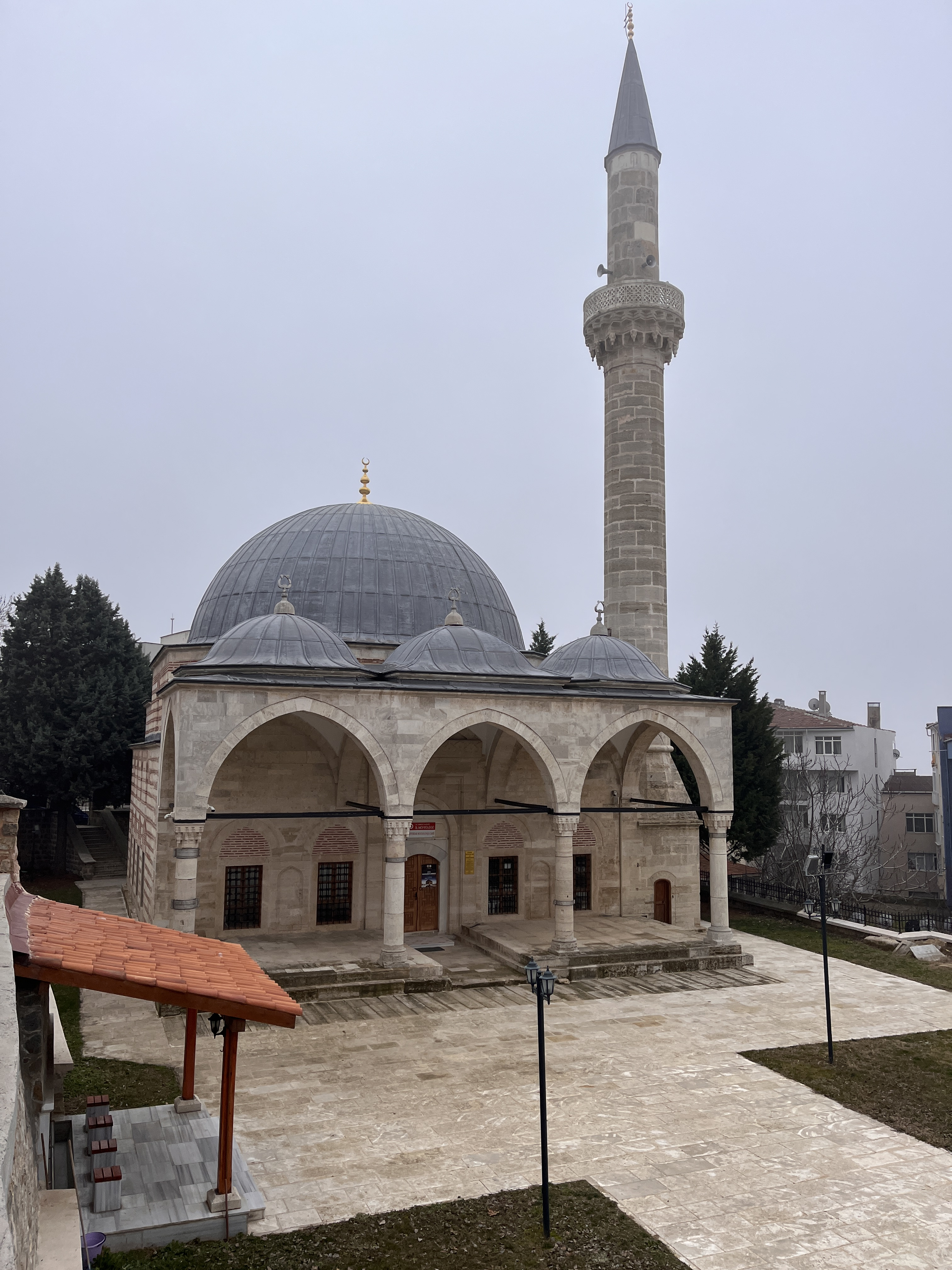

Religion
- Affiliation: Sunni Islam

Location
- Location: Edirne, Turkey
- Interactive map of Defterdar Mustafa Pasha Mosque
- Coordinates: 41.6726°N 26.5616°E

Architecture
- Architect: Mimar Sinan
- Type: Mosque
- Style: Ottoman architecture
- Completed: 16th century
- Minaret: 1
- Type: Cultural
- Criteria: i, iv

Defterdar Mustafa Pasha Mosque, mosque in the provincial centre of Edirne built by Defterdar Mustafa Pasha in the second half of the 16th century by Mimar Sinan.

Defterdar Mustafa Pasha Mosque was built by Mustafa Pasha, who was the Defterdar during the reign of Suleiman the Magnificent and Selim II, to Mimar Sinan. Located in Sabuni Quarter in the centre of Edirne, the mosque has entrance gates on Tekke Bayırı Street and Tunahan Şeker Street. The name of the mosque, which is located in a large courtyard, is also mentioned as Defterdar Mosque, Defterdar Mustafa Çelebi Mosque, Defterdar Kara Mustafa Pasha Mosque in the sources. The mosque, whose dome collapsed in the earthquake that occurred in 1751, was reopened to worship with a wooden roof this time with the efforts of Hacı Ruşen Efendi. During this repair, a madrasah was also built in the courtyard.

With the restorations carried out by the General Directorate of Foundations in 1953 and 1962, the dome, last congregation place, crown door and windows of the mosque were renewed in accordance with the original. The last restoration of the mosque started in 2020. The mosque, whose restoration took two years, was opened for worship on 21 April 2022.
