= Sheikh Shuja Mosque =

Mosque in Edirne, Turkey

- Şeyh Şüca CamiiOpenStreetMap
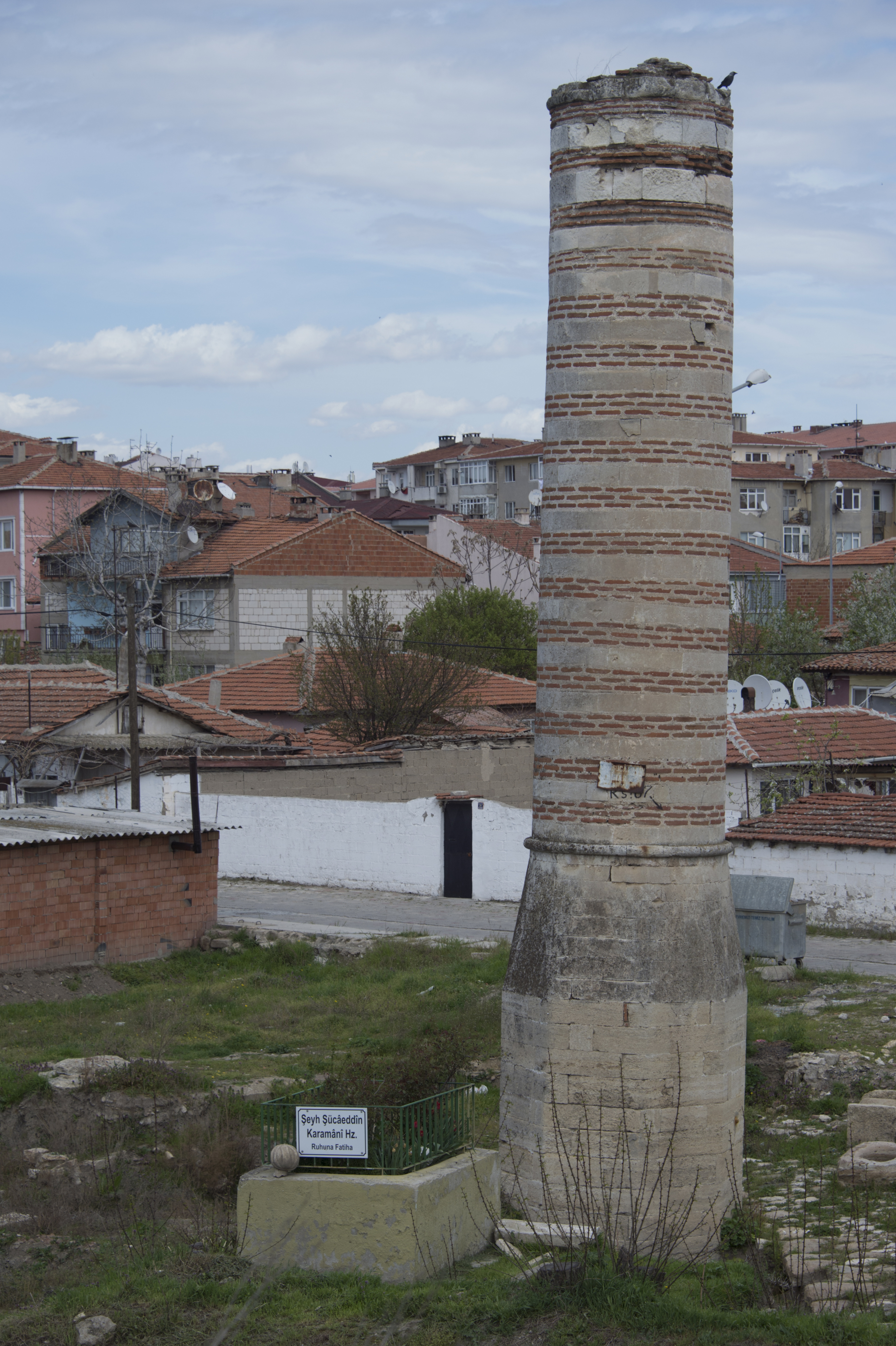

Religion
- Affiliation: Sunni Islam

Location
- Municipality: Edirne
- Country: Turkey
- Interactive map of Sheikh Shuja Mosque
- Coordinates: 41°40′26″N 26°32′41″E

Architecture
- Type: Mosque
- Style: Ottoman architecture
- Completed: 15th century
- Minaret: 1
- Type: Cultural

Sheikh Shuca Mosque, a mosque built in the provincial centre of Edirne during the Ottoman Empire.

Sheikh Shuca Mosque was built by Murad II as a mosque and zawiya, and was converted into a mosque by Sultan Suleiman the Magnificent in 1535. The mosque was destroyed in an earthquake in 1751 and rebuilt. Today, only the minaret remains of the destroyed mosque. The base and boot section of the minaret are made of cut stone, while the body is constructed of three rows of brick and one row of cut stone.

In December 2024, work began to rebuild the mosque and the adjacent tekke building.
