= Süle Çelebi Mosque =

Mosque in Edirne, Turkey

- Süle Çelebi Camii
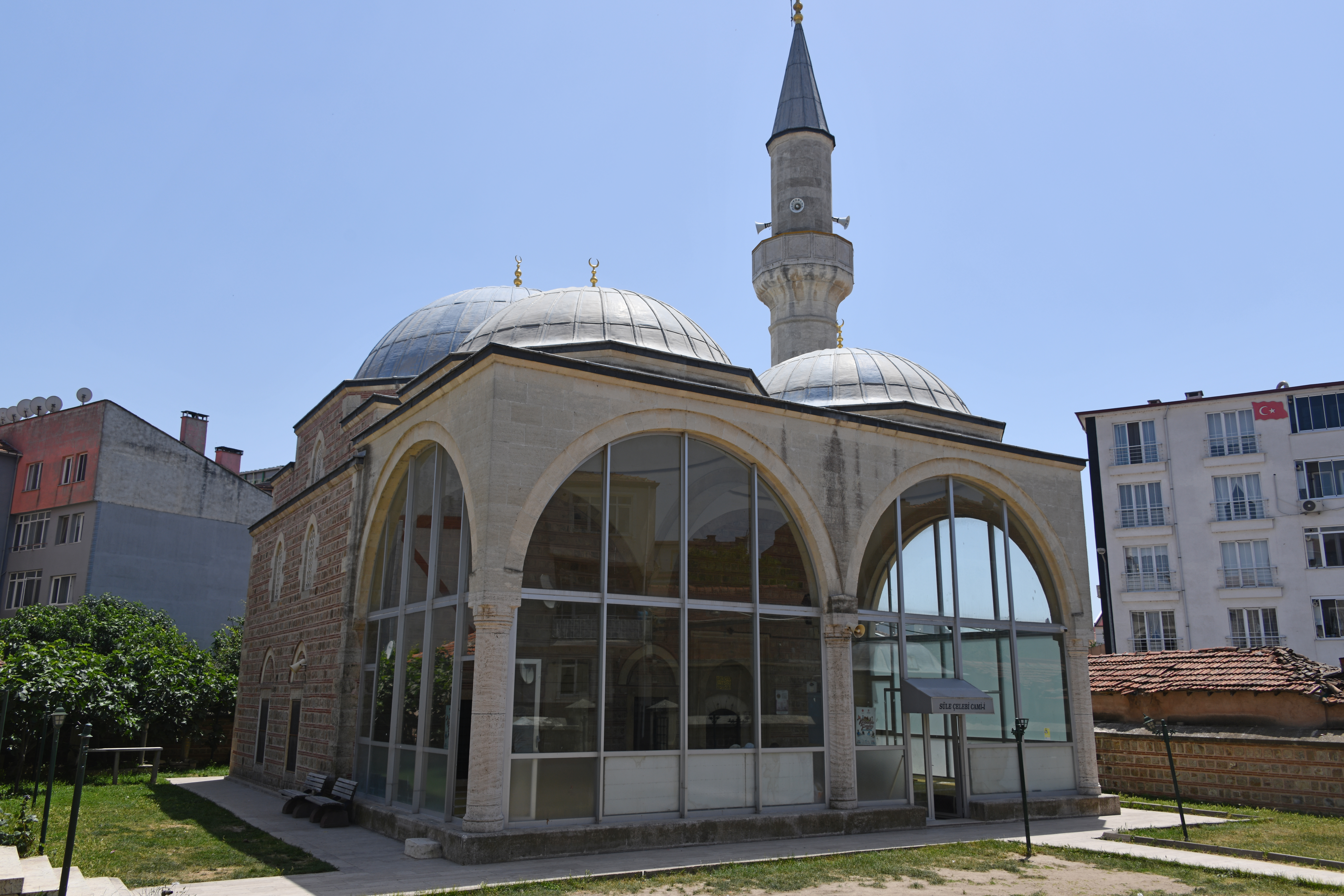

Religion
- Affiliation: Sunni Islam

Location
- Location: Edirne, Turkey
- Country: Turkey
- Interactive map of Süle Çelebi Mosque
- Coordinates: 41.6666°N 26.5655°E

Architecture
- Type: Mosque
- Style: Ottoman architecture
- Funded by: Hadji Süle
- Completed: 1559

Specifications
- Dome: 3
- Minaret: 1
- Type: Cultural

Süle Çelebi Mosque, a mosque built in 1559 in the centre of Edirne Province, Turkey by Hadji Süle, son of Hadji Sinan.

When first built, Süle Çelebi Mosque had one large dome and two smaller domes. During an earthquake in 1752, the dome collapsed and was replaced with a wooden roof. The mosque remained closed for a long time due to the damage it sustained, but was restored by the General Directorate of Foundations in 2005 and reopened for worship.

The mosque is located in a large courtyard surrounded by walls on all four sides and has a single dome and a square plan. There is a cemetery in the eastern corner and southeast of the mosque courtyard. The graves of Hadji Süle Çelebi, who built the mosque, and Sheikh Hacı Mustafa El Bekir of Bolu, a member of the Halveti order who died in 1716, are also in this cemetery. The Hacı Ali Fountain is located in the western corner of the courtyard. There are four windows on the qibla and side walls of the mosque, two at the bottom and two at the top. The two-eyed rear prayer area is covered by two domes. A mihrab with a window on either side is placed in the centre of the rear prayer area.
