= İsmail Agha Mosque =

Mosques in Edirne, Turkey

- İsmail Ağa Camii
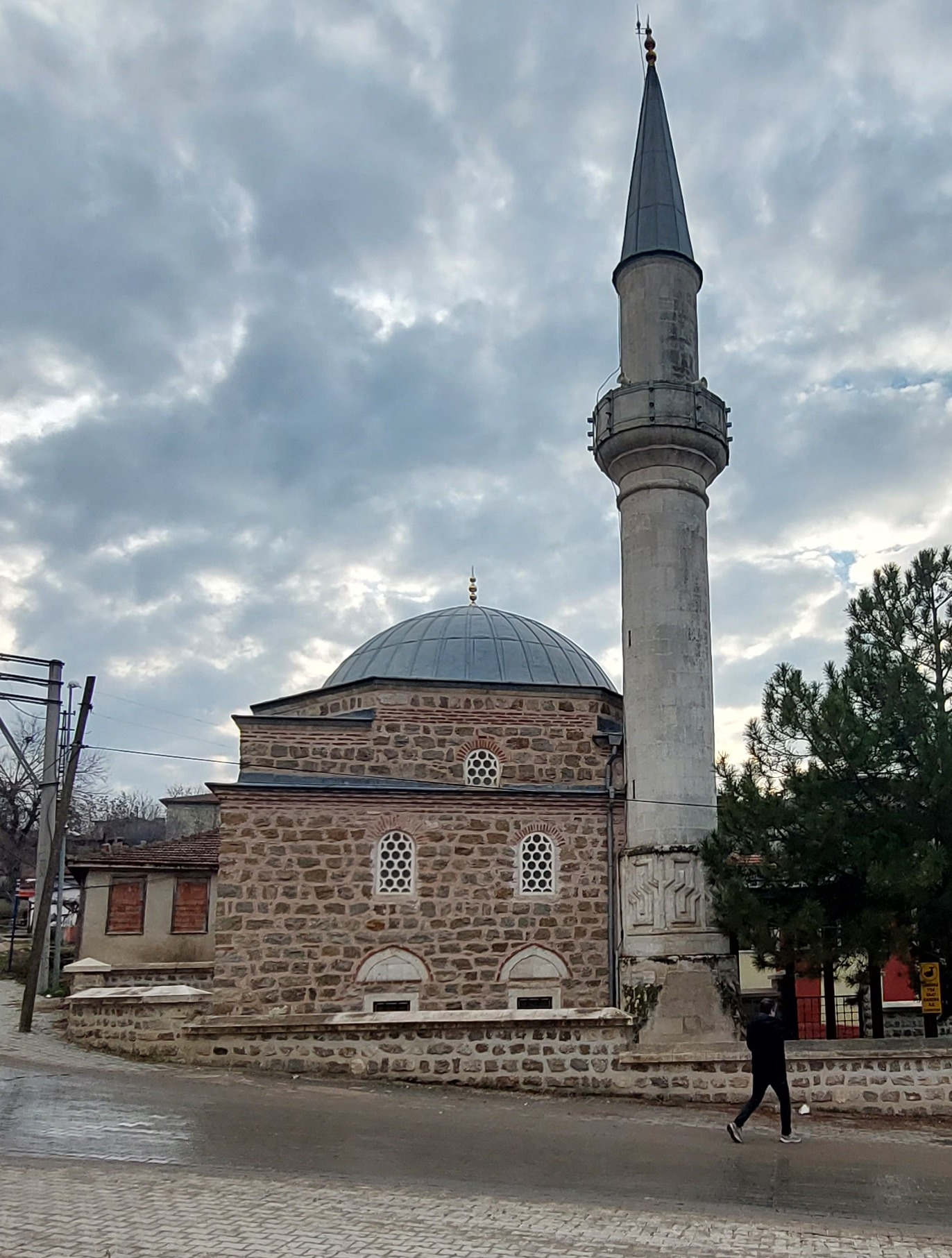

Religion
- Affiliation: Sunni Islam

Location
- Location: Edirne, Turkey
- Interactive map of İsmail Agha Mosque
- Coordinates: 41°41′02″N 26°33′32″E

Architecture
- Type: Mosque
- Style: Ottoman architecture
- Completed: 15th century
- Minaret: 1
- Type: Cultural
- Criteria: i, iv

Ismail Agha Mosque or Baruthane Mosque, mosque built by Ismail Aga in the mid-15th century in the provincial centre of Edirne, Turkey.

Ismail Aga Mosque was built in the mid-15th century by Ismail Aga, known for his philanthropy, who lived during the reigns of Sultan Mehmet the Conqueror and Bayezid II. Built in a small garden on a sloping land from south to north, the mosque has a square dome. The minaret in the north corner of the mosque has a single balcony. There is a martyr's grave in the last congregation place of the mosque, which is seated on eight wooden supports.

The mosque, which was repaired in 1631, 1911, 1993 and 2005, was finally restored with a 2-year work between 2018 and 2020. During this restoration, a women's cloister was added to the mosque. The garden and ablution places of the mosque were renovated.
