= Kuşçu Doğan Mosque =

Mosques in Edirne, Turkey

- Kuşçu Doğan Camii
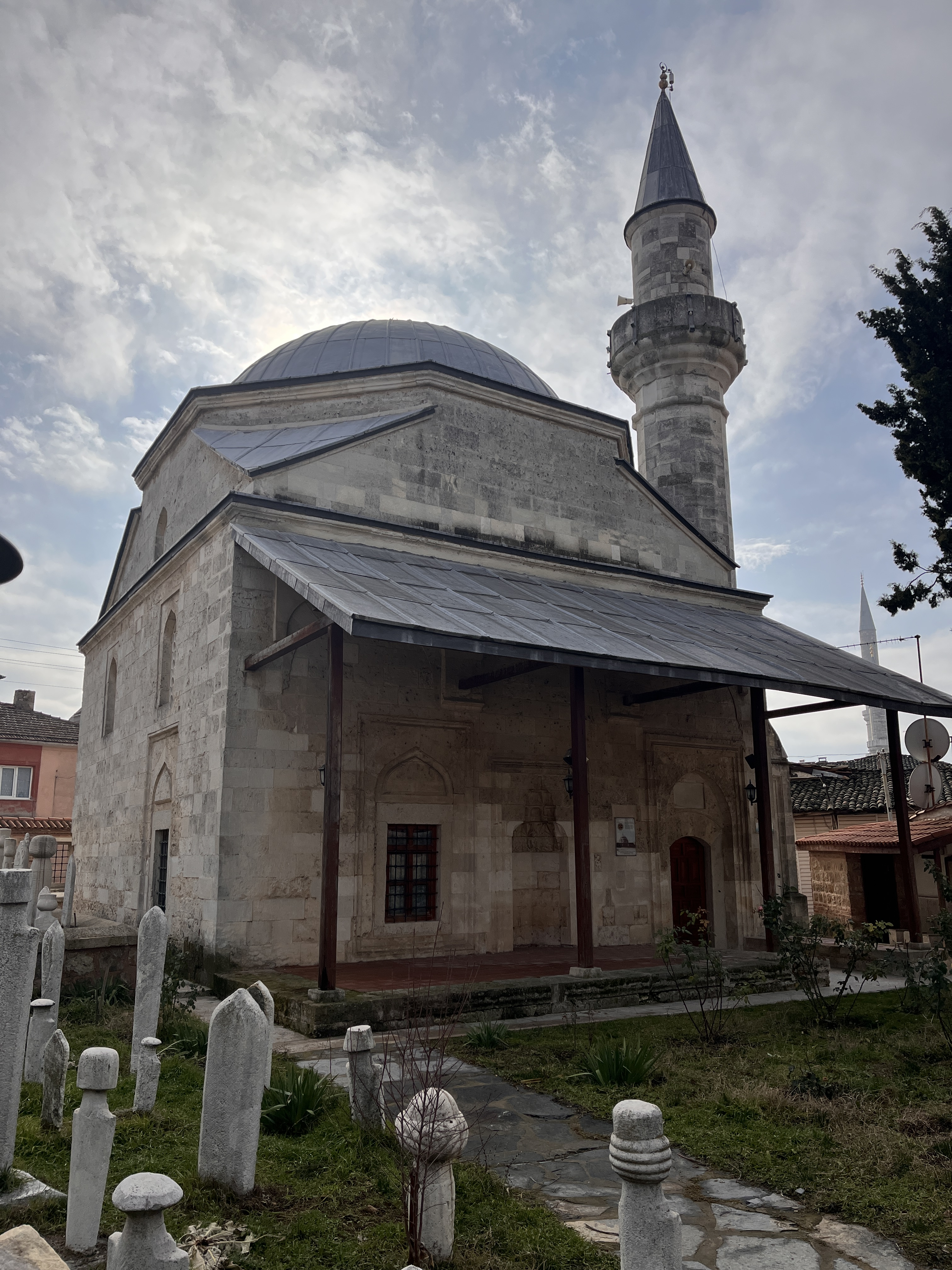

Religion
- Affiliation: Sunni Islam

Location
- Location: Edirne, Turkey
- Interactive map of Kuşçu Doğan Mosque
- Coordinates: 41°40′48″N 26°33′15″E

Architecture
- Type: Mosque
- Style: Ottoman architecture
- Completed: 15th century
- Minaret: 1
- Type: Cultural
- Criteria: i, iv

Kuşçu Doğan Mosque, in the provincial center of Edirne, was built in the early 15th century by Kuşçu Doğan, who was a Janissary Agha during the reigns of Murad II and Sultan Mehmet the Conqueror.

The mosque, with a square plan and a single dome, is sited in a small garden. The 8.46-meter dome of the mosque sits on an octagonal pulley. There are four windows on each of the east, west and south walls of the mosque. There are many gravestone in the graveyard of the mosque.
