= Gazi Mihal Bey Mosque =

Mosques in Edirne, Turkey

- Gazi Mihal Bey Camii
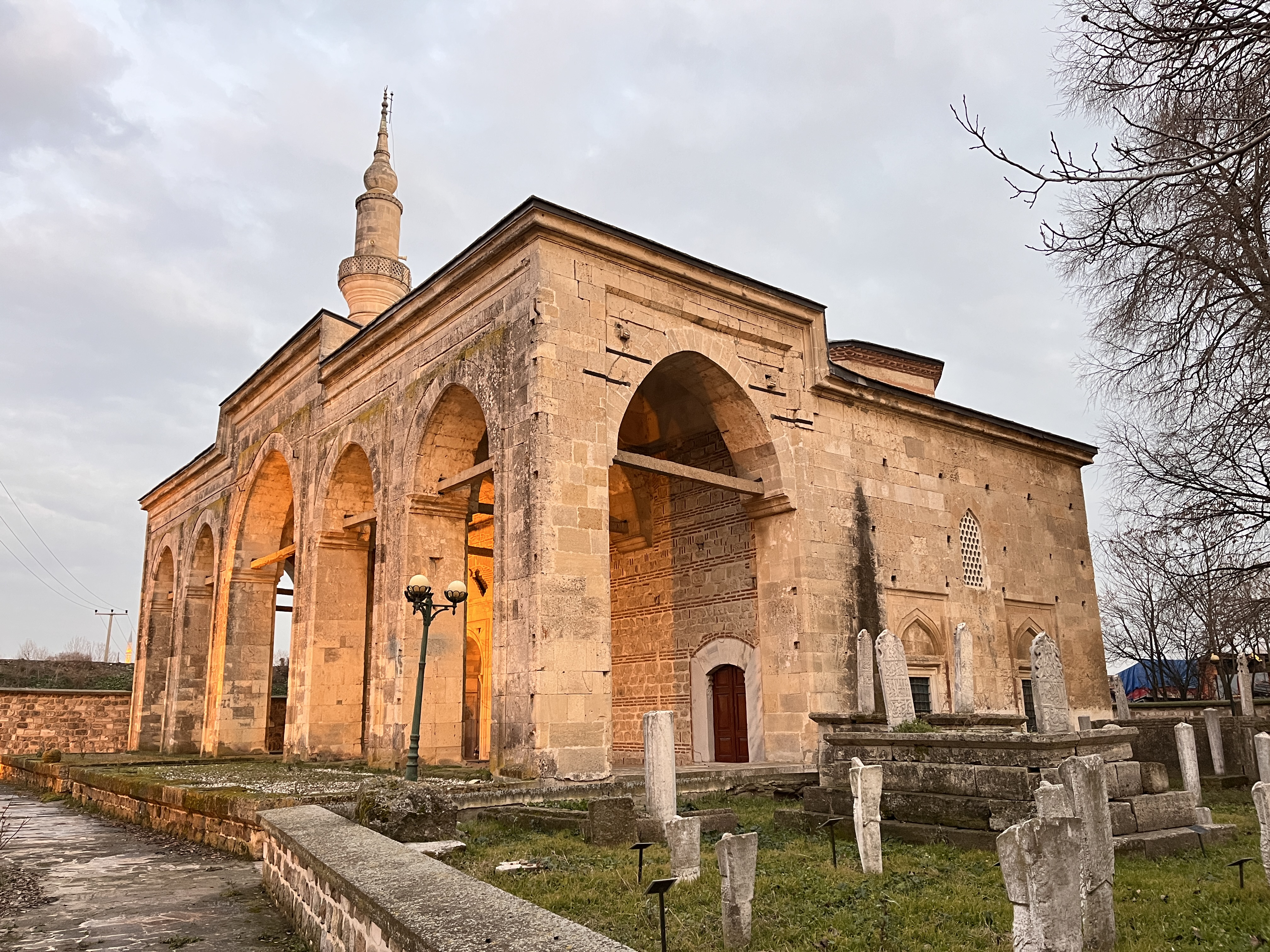

Religion
- Affiliation: Sunni Islam

Location
- Location: Edirne, Turkey
- Interactive map of Gazi Mihal Bey Mosque
- Coordinates: 41°40′33″N 26°32′25″E

Architecture
- Type: Mosque
- Style: Ottoman architecture
- Completed: 1422
- Minaret: 1
- Type: Cultural
- Criteria: i, iv

Gazi Mihal Bey Mosque, mosque built in Edirne during the reign of the Ottoman sultan Murad II. According to the inscription on the inscription of the mosque, it was built by Emîrü'l-kebîr Mihal b. Azîz in 1422.

Located next to Gazi Mihal Bridge, the minaret of the mosque has onion knuckles and the dome has a stone cone. The mosque has one minaret.

The fountain, which is seen in a photograph of the mosque taken in 1920, does not exist today. It is also understood from the photograph that it was built after the mosque. There is the graveyard of Gazi Mihaloğlu family in the treasury next to the mosque.

Evliya Çelebi, after visiting the mosque in 1653, mentioned about Gazi Mihal Mosque as ‘It described it as an ancient mosque on a peninsula’.
