= Bademlik Mosque =

Mosque in Edirne, Turkey

- Bademlik Camii
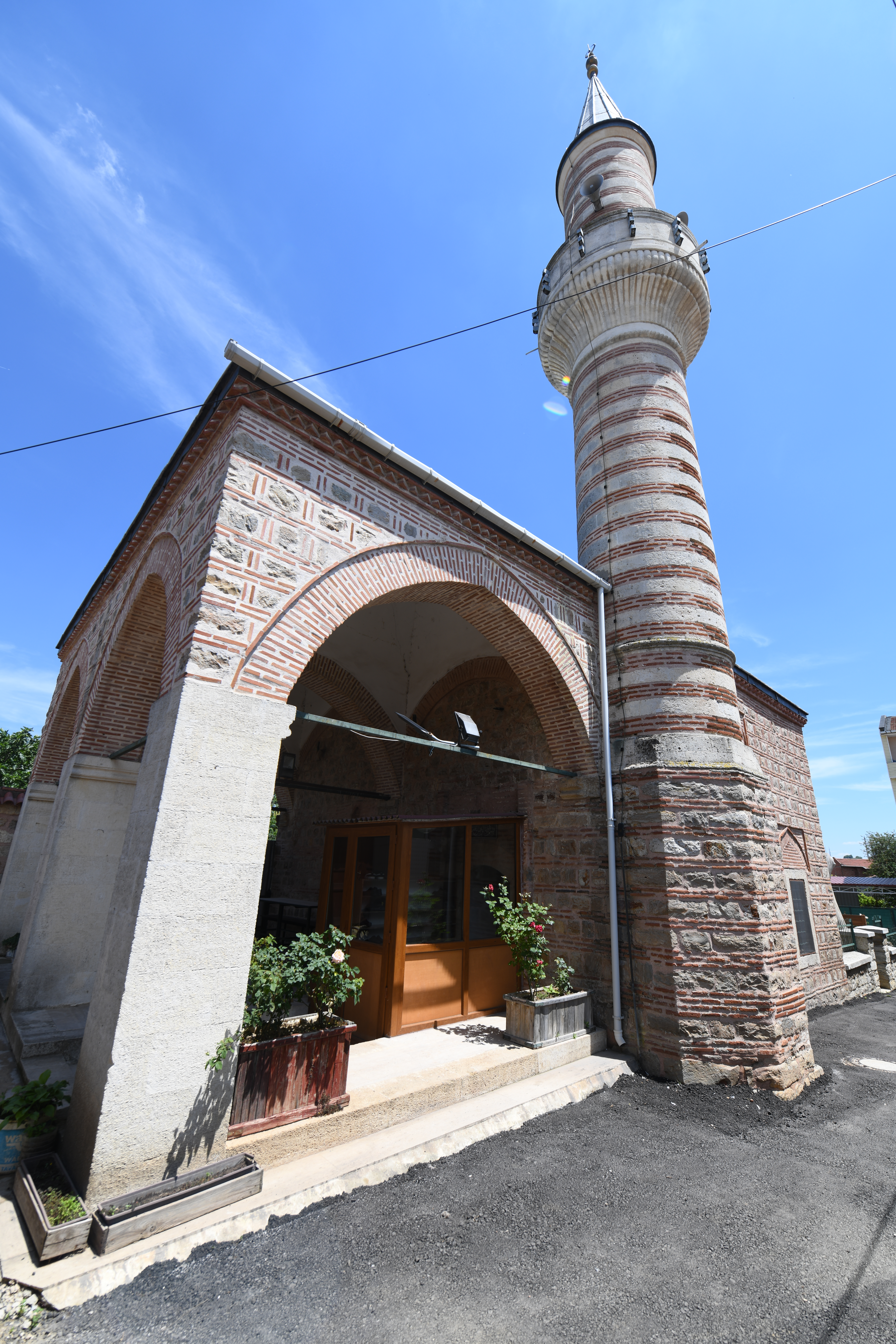

Religion
- Affiliation: Sunni Islam

Location
- Location: Edirne, Turkey
- Country: Turkey
- Interactive map of Bademlik Mosque
- Coordinates: 41.68728°N 26.5394°E

Architecture
- Type: Mosque
- Style: Ottoman architecture
- Funded by: Emir Hüseyin Bey
- Completed: 15th-century

Specifications
- Dome: 1
- Minaret: 1
- Type: Cultural

Bademlik Mosque (Turkish: Bademlik Camii) is a mosque built in the 15th century by Emir Hüseyin Bey in the center of Edirne province. Located in the Yeni İmaret neighborhood, the mosque is also known as Hıdırlık Mosque, Emir Hüseyin Mosque, and Emir Şah Mosque.

Bademlik Mosque is a typical example of Early Ottoman Architecture, as seen in Edirne, Bursa, İznik, and Amasya, in terms of its plan type, construction materials and techniques, facade layout, decoration, and the location of its minaret. The square-plan, single-domed mosque has a cradle vault covering the rear prayer area. The minaret, located at the northern end of the western wall, has a shaft constructed with one row of cut stone and three rows of brick. The qibla and side walls of the mosque each have three windows, two at the bottom and one at the top.
