= Lari Mosque =

Mosques in Edirne, Turkey

- Lari Camii
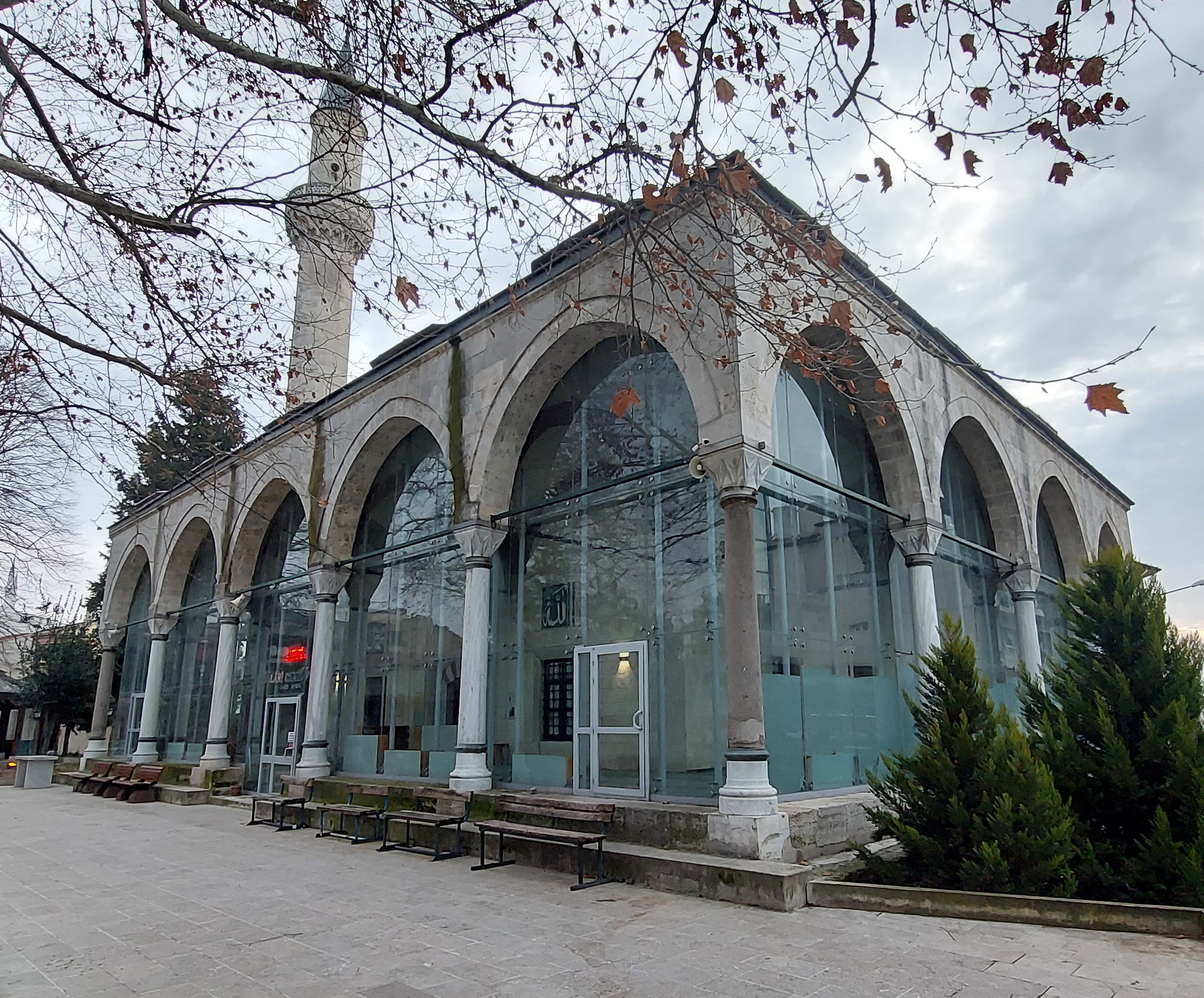

Religion
- Affiliation: Sunni Islam

Location
- Location: Edirne, Turkey
- Interactive map of Lari Mosque
- Coordinates: 41°40′25″N 26°33′15″E

Architecture
- Type: Mosque
- Style: Ottoman architecture
- Completed: 16th century
- Minaret: 1
- Type: Cultural
- Criteria: i, iv

The Lari Mosque is a mosque in the provincial center of Edirne, Turkey built in the early 16th century by Hakim Abdülhamid Lari Çelebi, who served as the head physician in the palace during the reigns of Fatih Sultan Mehmet and Bayezid II. The mosque is popularly known as Lâleli Mosque.

== History ==
The construction of the Lari Mosque was started by the physician Abdülhamid Lâri Çelebi, who served as the chief physician at the palace during the reigns of Sultan Mehmet the Conqueror (1432-1481) and Beyazid II (1448-1512). Due to the death of Abdülhamid Lâri Çelebi, the construction of the mosque was completed by Hamit Bey, the trustee of the Beyazid II Foundation. Built on a sloping land from east to west, the mosque is the largest of the single-domed and single-minaret mosques in Edirne. The porticoes surrounding three sides of the mosque are covered with 11 domes. There is an Arabic inscription of 3 couplets above the entrance door.

In the 1752 Great Edirne Earthquake, the main dome of the mosque collapsed and most of the portico domes were damaged. Iplikçi Ahmet Aga, one of the philanthropists, built a wooden dome for the mosque. The mosque, which was in a dilapidated state for a long time after the 1930s, was described in the poem Lara Mosque by Arif Nihat Asya, who was a Literature teacher at Edirne High School between 1948 and 1950, with the lines “Larî Mosque”... The blue of the sky is visible from the gaps of its dome. The mosque, which was repaired in the 1970s, took its present form after two major restorations in 1983 and 2006.
