= Shah Melek Mosque =

Mosque in Edirne, Turkey

- Şah Melek Camii
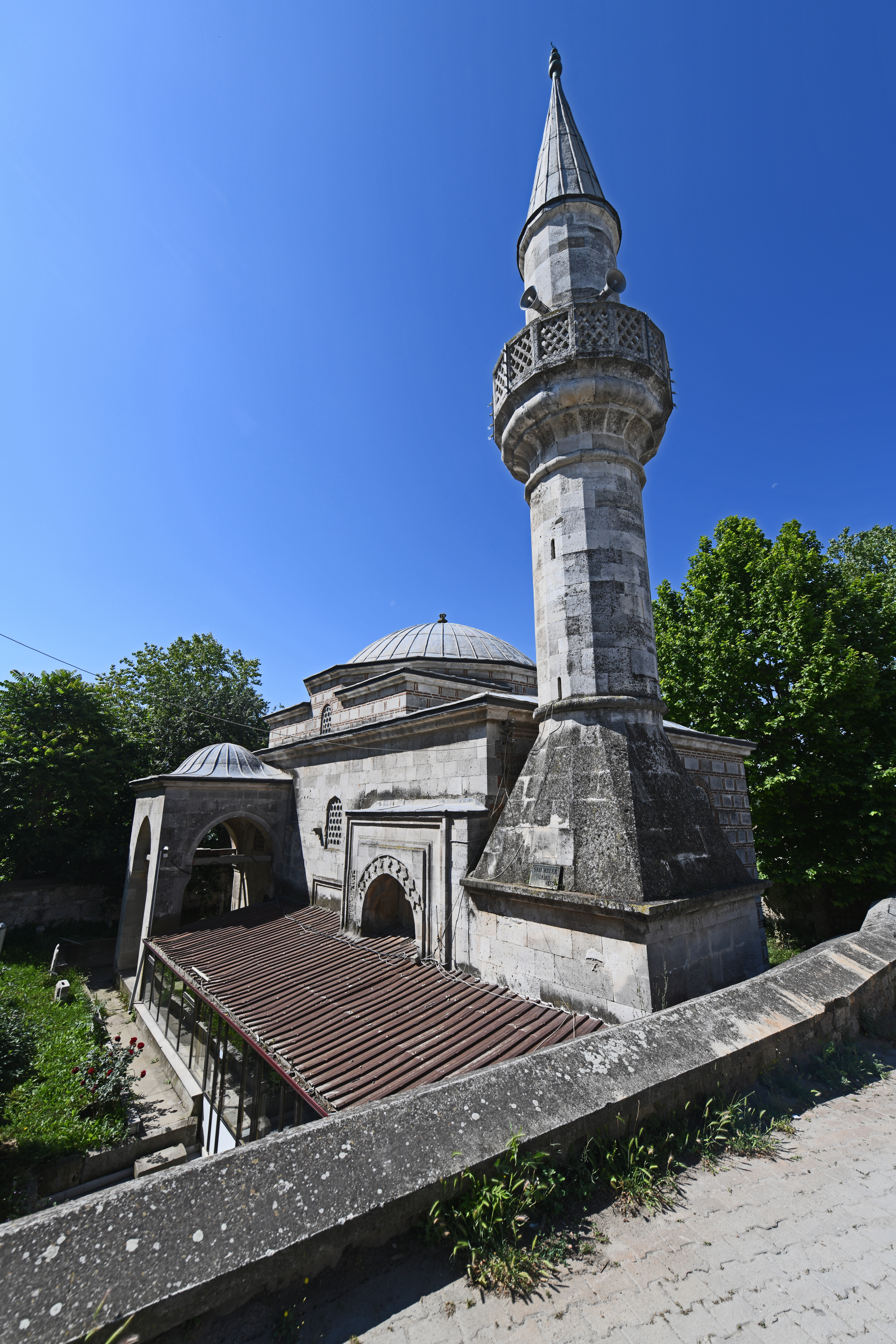

Religion
- Affiliation: Sunni Islam

Location
- Location: Edirne, Turkey
- Interactive map of Shah Melek Mosque
- Coordinates: 41°40′35″N 26°32′38″E

Architecture
- Type: Mosque
- Style: Ottoman architecture
- Completed: 1429
- Minaret: 1
- Type: Cultural

Shah Melek Mosque is an Ottoman-era mosque located in Edirne, Turkey. It was built in 1429 by Shah Melek Pasha, who served as the Rumeli Beylerbey during the reigns of Ottoman sultans Mehmed I and Murad II.

During the Balkan War, its minaret was destroyed when it was hit by a cannonball. It is a rectangular-plan masonry structure. It has a single dome and a single minaret.
