= Şehabeddin Pasha Mosque =

Mosque in Edirne, Turkey

- Şehabeddin Paşa Camii
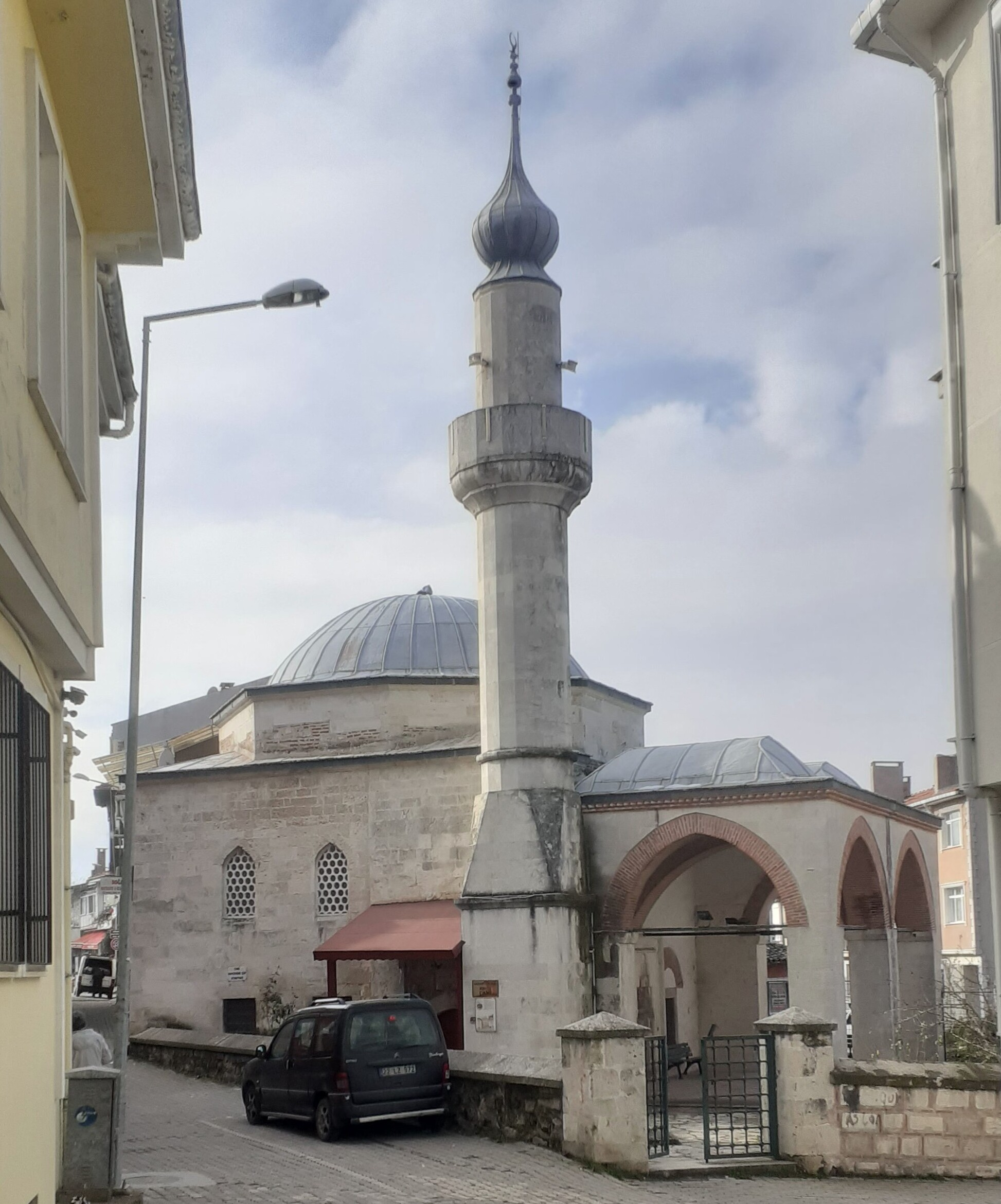

Religion
- Affiliation: Sunni Islam

Location
- Location: Edirne, Turkey
- Interactive map of Şehabeddin Pasha Mosque
- Coordinates: 41°40′46″N 26°33′30″E

Architecture
- Type: Mosque
- Style: Ottoman architecture
- Completed: 1436
- Minaret: 1
- Type: Cultural

Şehabeddin Pasha Mosque (Turkish: Şehabeddin Paşa Camii) is a historic Ottoman mosque located in Edirne, Turkey. Commissioned in 1436 during the reign of Sultan Murad II, it is also known as the Kirazlı Mosque (Cherry Mosque). The mosque takes its name from its founder, Şehabeddin Pasha, a vizier and military commander who served under Sultans Murad II and Mehmed II.

== History ==
According to the inscription on the mosque's gate, it was built by Abdullah son of Hacı Şahabettin in the Islamic year 840 (1436-37 CE). The founder, Şehabeddin Pasha, was a statesman of probable Georgian origin who rose through the Ottoman palace system to become Beylerbey (provincial governor) of Rumelia. Pasha was a significant patron of architecture in Edirne, and this mosque was part of a larger pious foundation (waqf) that included a bridge, a public bath, and other structures.

The construction history of the present structure, however, contains some uncertainty. While the original commission dates to Şehabeddin Pasha's lifetime, an inscription above the entrance door records a construction date of 1497-98 (H. 903) and names the builder as Mehmet Çelebi, son of Karamanlı Mehmet. According to local tradition, Şahabeddin Pasha's original mosque was demolished for an unknown reason, and this later structure was a reconstruction by Karamanlı Mehmet at the end of the 15th century.

The building has undergone changes since its construction. The current structure differs from its original 15th-century form. The minaret visible today is not the original one, and the two-bayed porch in front of the mosque is also the result of later reconstruction. The mosque underwent a major restoration in 2010.

Some parts of the mosque's original doors, which resembled Seljuk-era craftsmanship, were moved to the museum section of the Sultan Selim Library on the advice of Rıfat Osman.

== Architecture ==
The mosque was built on sloping land, with smooth cut stone used for the prayer hall walls, brick for the dome, and a combination of stone and brick on the facades. The south and west walls each contain four windows arranged in two rows—rectangular windows below and pointed arch windows above. On the north wall, an exterior mihrab protrudes outward as a five-sided niche covered with muqarnas decoration. Inside, the transition to the round dome is achieved through pendentives, and the interior mihrab has a half-octagonal plan.
