= Sarıca Pasha Mosque =

Mosque in Edirne, northwestern Turkey

- Sarıca Paşa Camii
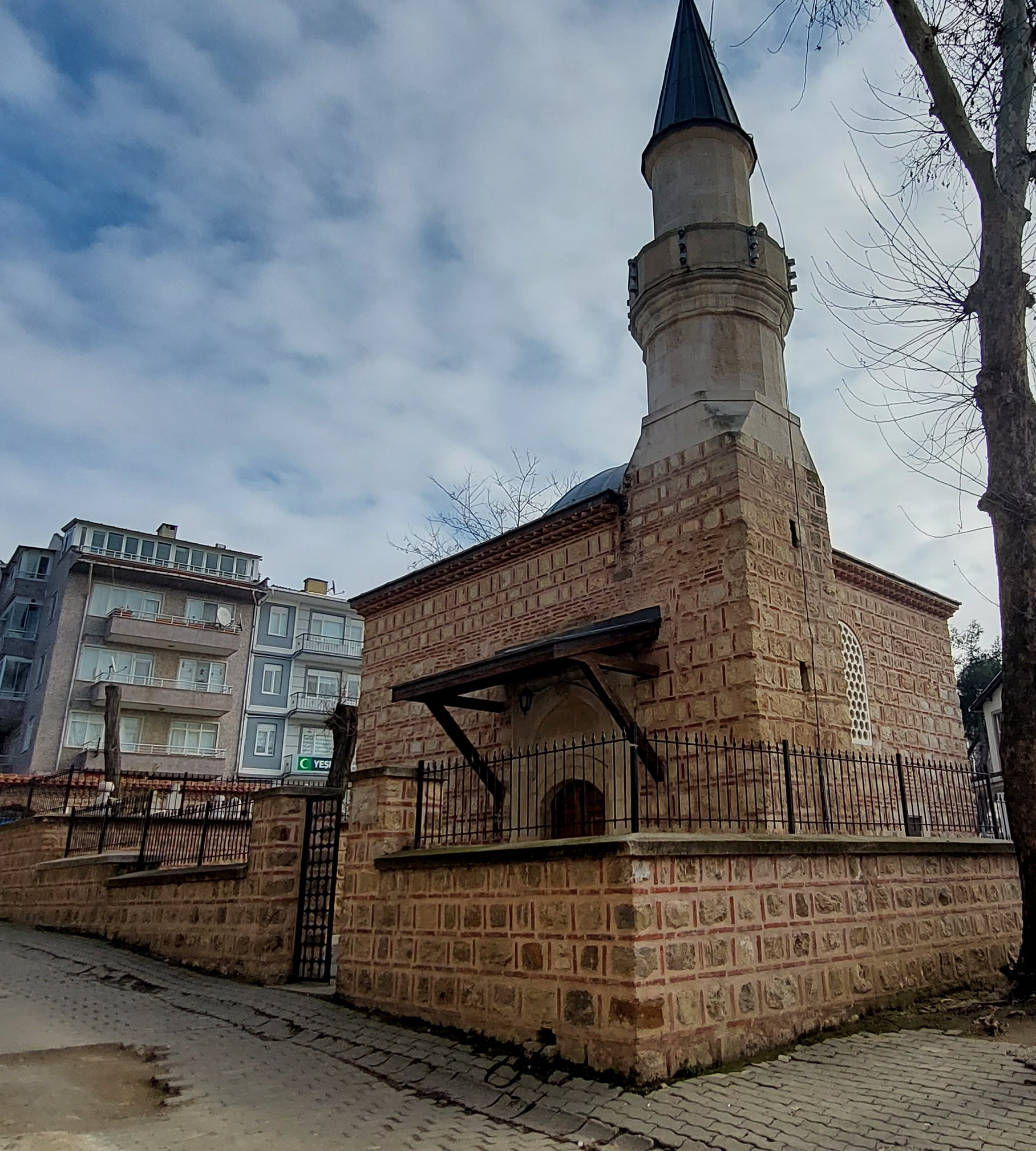

Religion
- Affiliation: Sunni Islam

Location
- Location: Edirne, Turkey
- Country: Turkey
- Interactive map of Sarıca Pasha Mosque
- Coordinates: 41°40′30″N 26°33′39″E

Architecture
- Type: Mosque
- Style: Ottoman architecture
- Funded by: Sarıca Pasha
- Completed: 15th-century
- Minaret: 1
- Type: Cultural

Sarıca Pasha Mosque or Saruca Pasha Mosque, a mosque built in the 15th century by Sarıca Paşa, who served as vizier during the reigns of Murad II and Mehmed the Conqueror, in the centre of Edirne province.

Sarıca Paşa Mosque was built on a nearly square rectangular plan within a two-tiered garden. The mosque is located on the lower tier of the garden, while the hazire (cemetery) is on the upper tier. Bricks, roughly hewn stone and neatly cut stone were used in the construction of the mosque. There are three double-sided windows on the side and qibla walls. The upper row of windows is decorated with stained glass. The cemetery of the mosque contains the graves of Grand Vizier Merzifonlu Kara Mustafa Pasha and Vezir Melek İbrahim Pasha.

The restoration of the mosque, which was started in 2016 by the Edirne Regional Directorate of Foundations, was completed one year later, and the mosque was reopened for worship after the Friday prayer on 16 June 2017. A delegation led by Alp Kargı, Mayor of Merzifon, who came from Merzifon to attend the opening of the mosque, placed soil brought from his hometown on the tomb of Ottoman Grand Vizier Merzifonlu Kara Mustafa Pasha.
