= Sitti Shah Sultan Mosque =

Mosque in Edirne, Turkey

Sitti Şhah Sultan Mosque
- Sitti Şah Sultan Camii
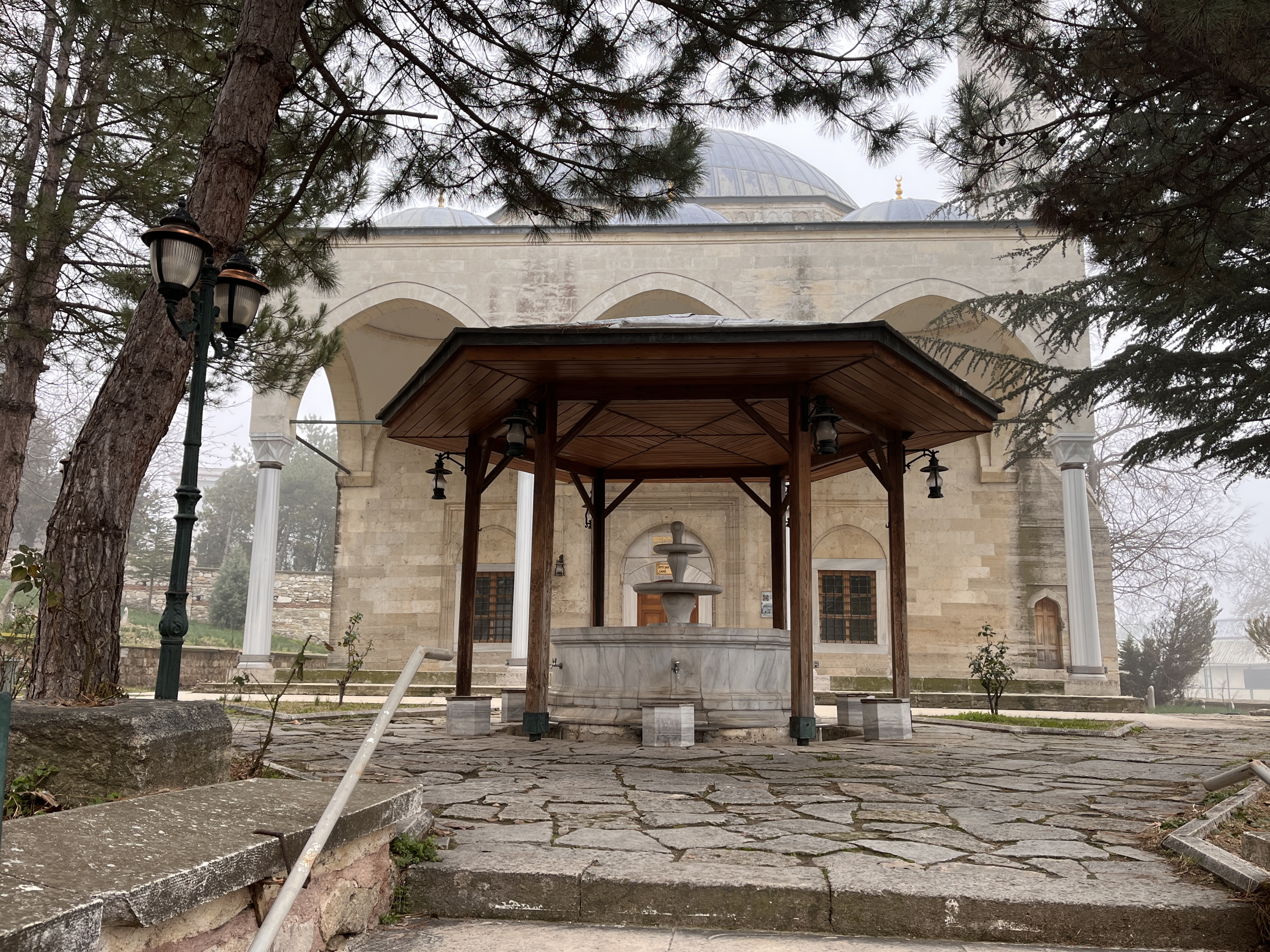

Religion
- Affiliation: Sunni Islam

Location
- Location: Edirne, Turkey
- Interactive map of Sitti Şhah Sultan Mosque
- Coordinates: 41°40′24″N 26°33′34″E

Architecture
- Type: Mosque
- Style: Ottoman architecture
- Completed: 1482
- Minaret: 1
- Type: Cultural

The Sitti Şah Sultan Mosque, or simply the Sultan Mosque, is a mosque in Edirne, Turkey, built in 1482 by Yıldırım Bayezid in honour of Sitti Hatun, one of the wives of Fatih Sultan Mehmed.

In 1873, the Sitti Şah Sultan Mosque was used by the military as a gunpowder store, resulting in cracks appearing in its walls. During the 1910 earthquake, its minaret sustained serious damage. The mosque, which underwent restoration in the 1980s and 1990s, was listed under the decision of the Cultural Heritage Preservation Board dated 4 July 2003 and numbered 7697.
