= Yahya Bey Mosque =

Mosque in Edirne, Turkey

- Yahya Bey Camii
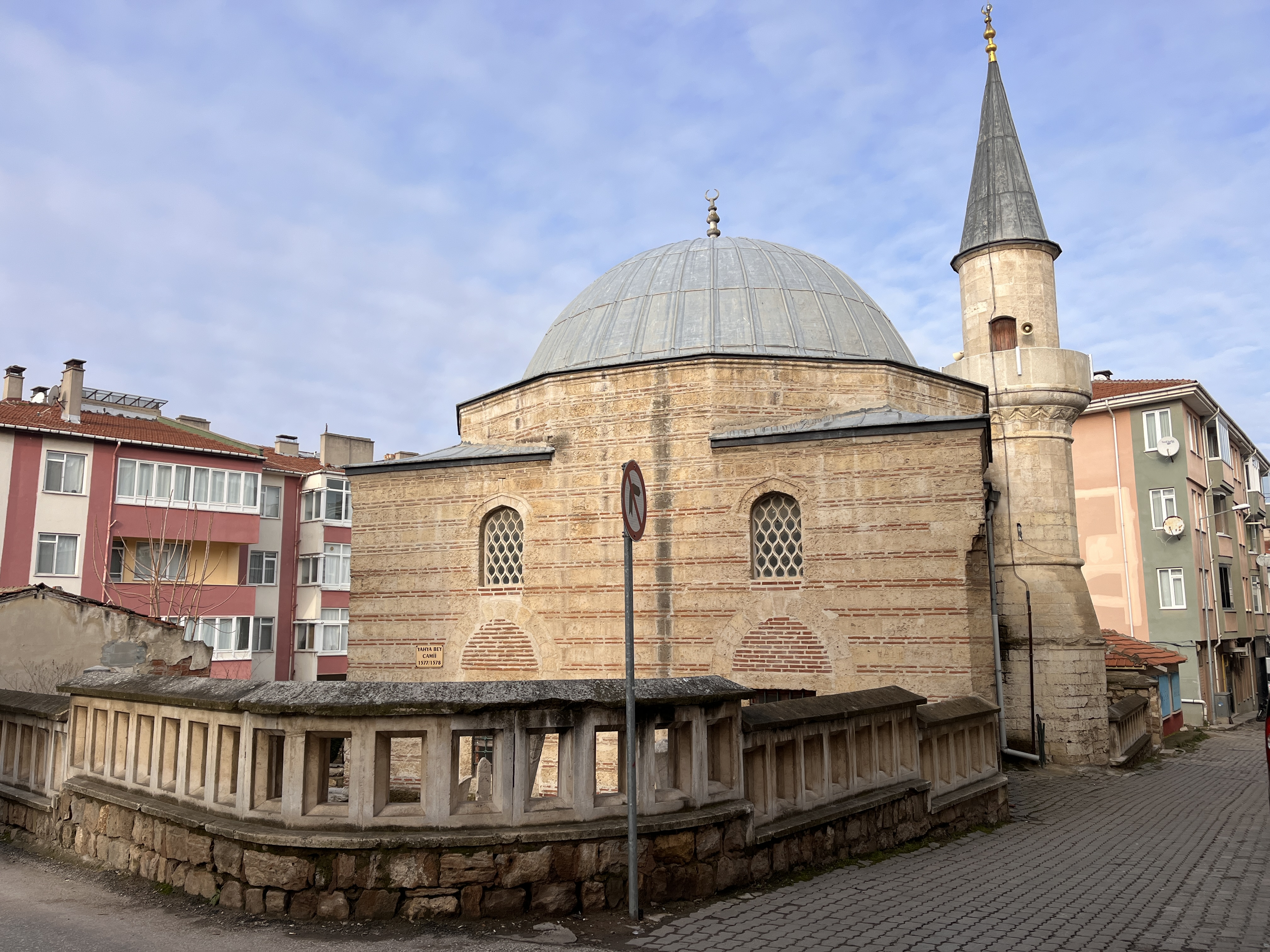

Religion
- Affiliation: Sunni Islam

Location
- Location: Edirne, Turkey
- Interactive map of Yahya Bey Mosque
- Coordinates: 41°40′35″N 26°33′48″E

Architecture
- Architect: Mimar Sinan
- Type: Mosque
- Style: Ottoman architecture
- Completed: 1577-1578

Specifications
- Dome: 1
- Minaret: 1
- Type: Cultural

Yahya Bey Mosque, a mosque located in the centre of Edirne, Turkey. It was commissioned as a mosque by the poet Yahya Bey and built by Mimar Sinan in 1577–1578.

The mosque was constructed using alternating layers of cut stone and brick in a square plan and features a single dome and minaret.

The mosque is owned by the General Directorate of Foundations and was restored in the 1990s. It was registered by the Edirne Cultural and Natural Heritage Preservation Board with its decision dated 04.07.2003 and numbered 7697.
