= Selçuk Hatun Mosque =

Mosque in Edirne, Turkey

- Selçuk Hatun Camii
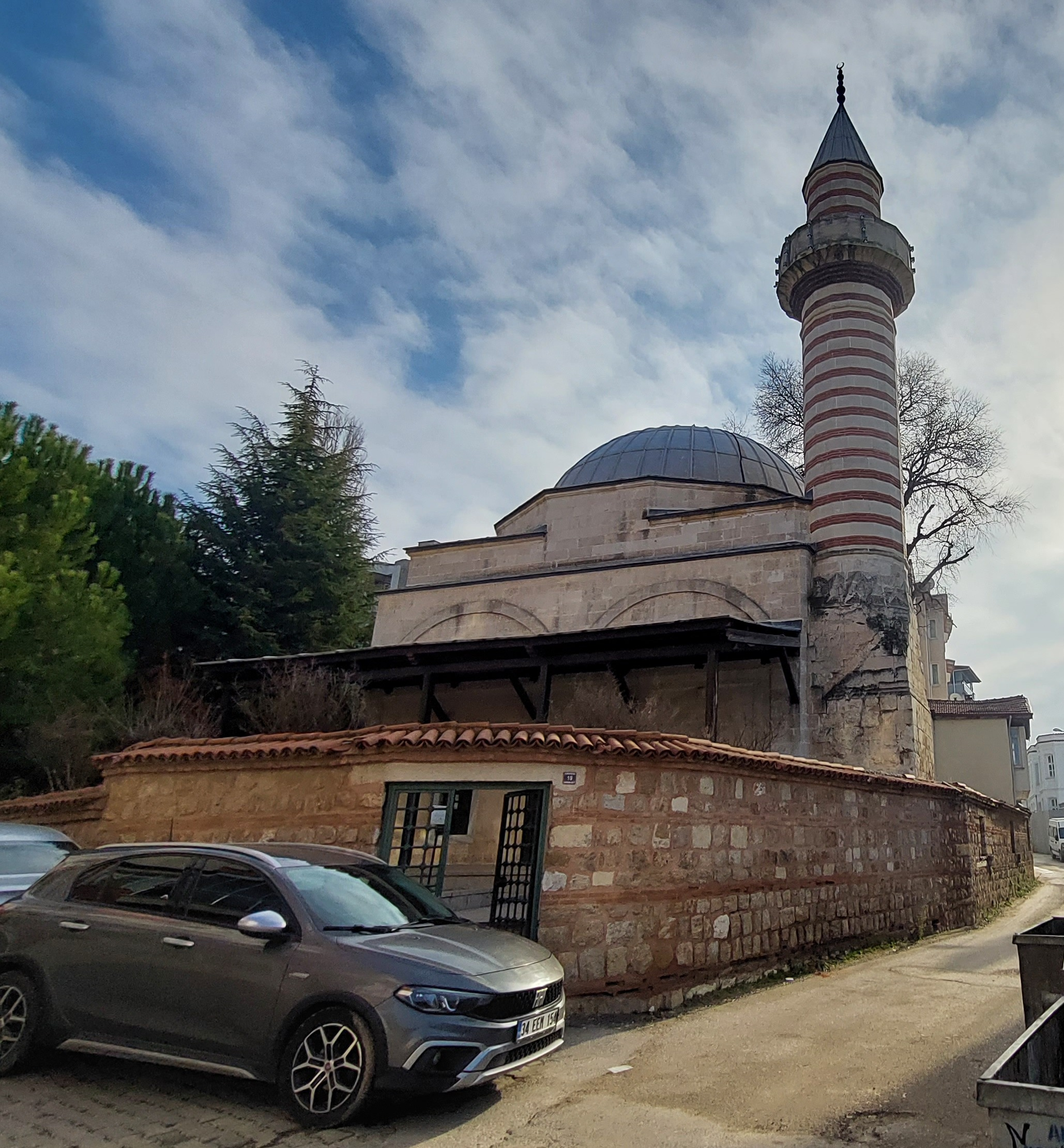

Religion
- Affiliation: Sunni Islam

Location
- Location: Edirne, Turkey
- Interactive map of Selçuk Hatun Mosque
- Coordinates: 41°40′31″N 26°33′32″E

Architecture
- Type: Mosque
- Style: Ottoman architecture
- Completed: 1456
- Minaret: 1
- Type: Cultural

Selçuk Hatun Mosque is a mosque from the Ottoman period, located in Edirne, Turkey. The mosque, built as a masjid by Selçuk Hatun in 1456, was later converted into a mosque with the addition of a minbar after the death of its imam, İbrahim Halife, who donated the money he had saved.

The mosque and minaret was constructed from cut stone with a square plan. It has a dome and a minaret. It was restored in 2003 and reopened for worship.
