= Gazi Hodja Mosque =

Mosques in Edirne, Turkey

- Gazi Hoca Camii
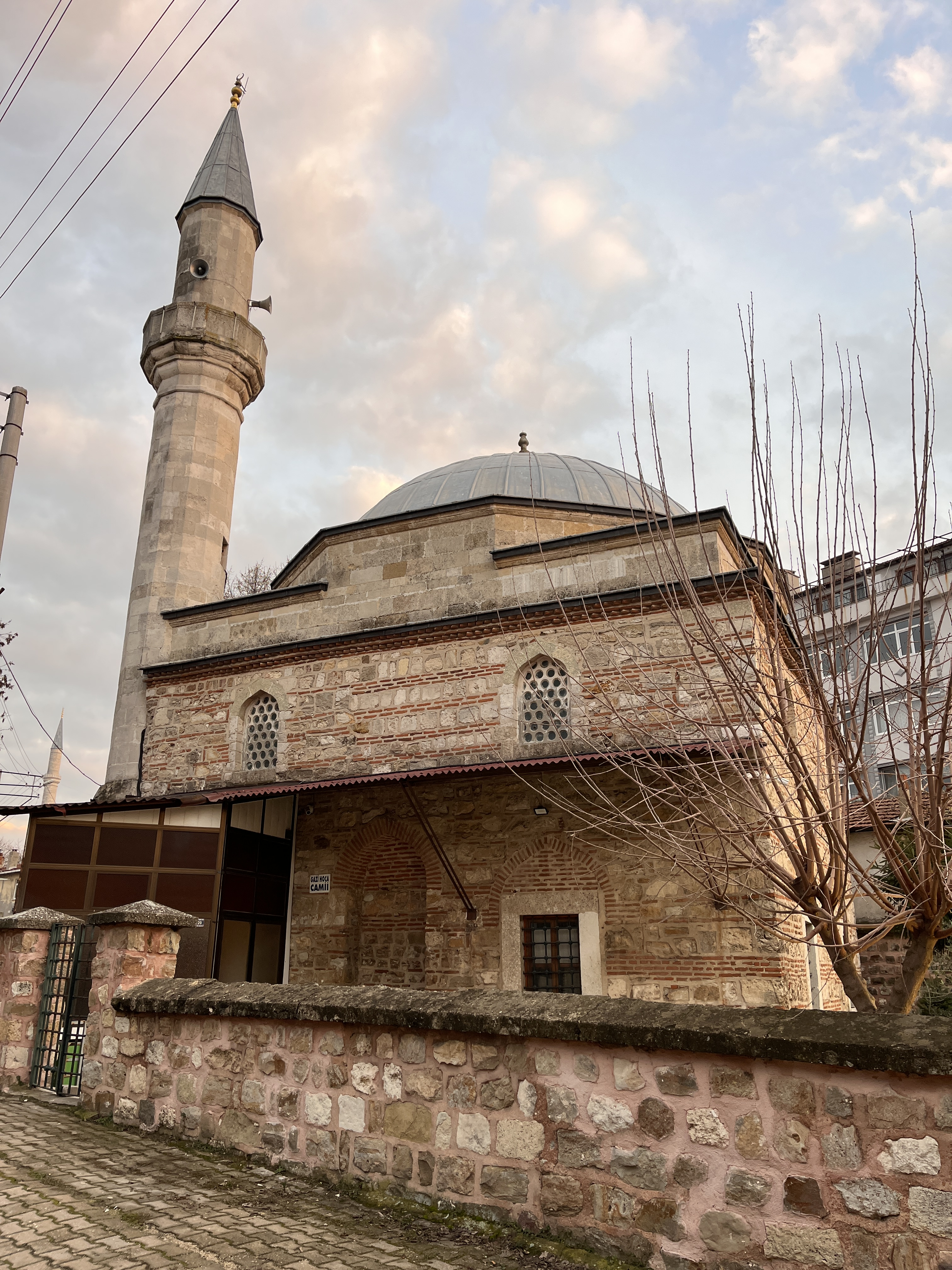

Religion
- Affiliation: Sunni Islam

Location
- Location: Edirne, Turkey
- Interactive map of Gazi Hodja Mosque
- Coordinates: 41°40′43″N 26°32′56″E

Architecture
- Type: Mosque
- Style: Ottoman architecture
- Completed: 14th century
- Minaret: 1
- Type: Cultural
- Criteria: i, iv

Gazi Hodja Mosque, a mosque built during the Ottoman period in Edirne.

Although the exact construction date of the mosque, which is a single-domed masonry building, is unknown, it is mentioned in the sources that it was built by Gazi Hoca Rüstem in the 14th century. The mosque, which is under the auspices of the General Directorate of Foundations, is under 1st degree protection by the Monuments Board. The mosque, which was restored in 1992, continues to be used today.
