= Kadı Bedrettin Mosque =

Mosques in Edirne, Turkey

- Kadı Bedrettin Camii
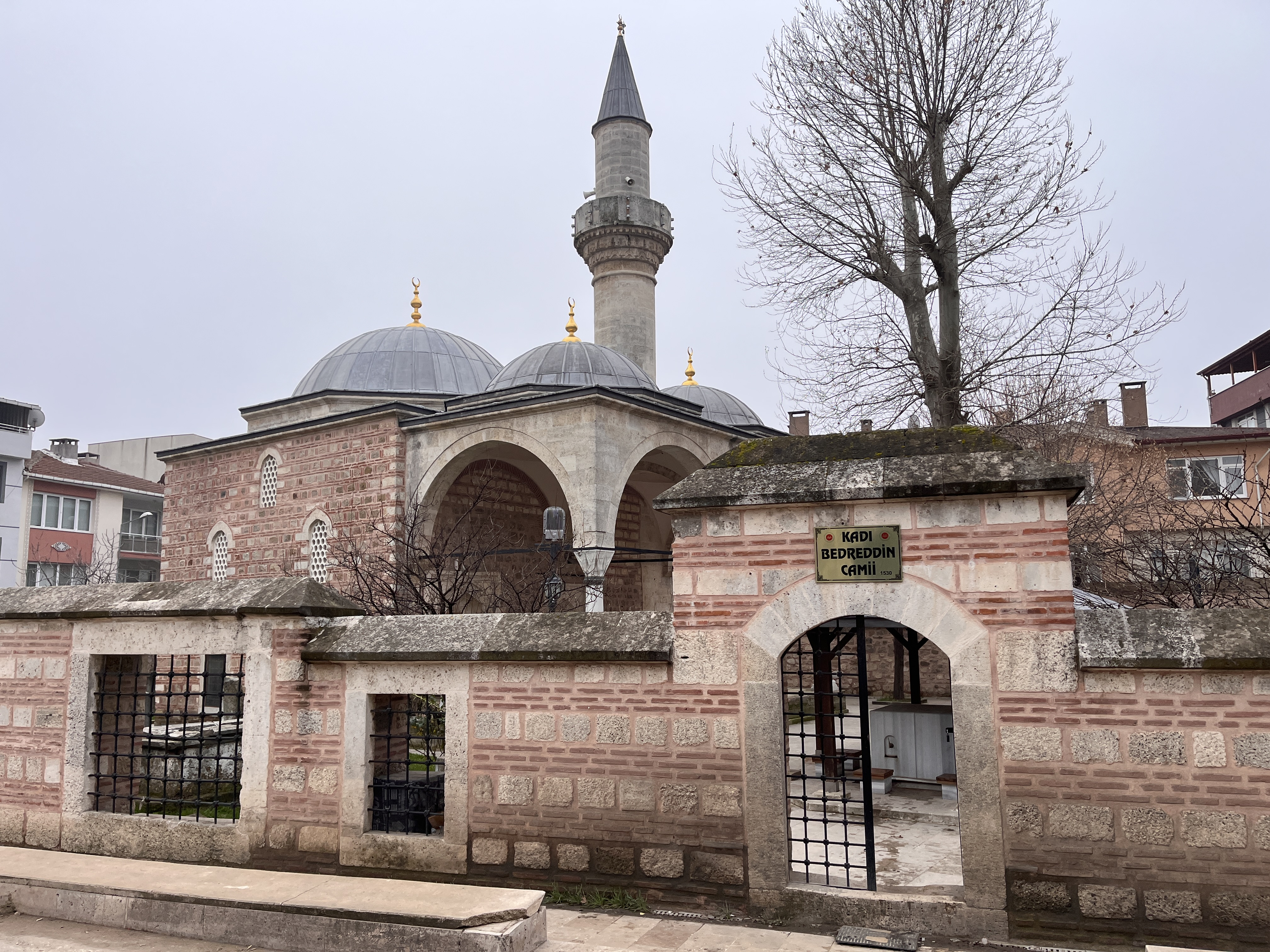

Religion
- Affiliation: Sunni Islam

Location
- Location: Edirne, Turkey
- Interactive map of Kadı Bedrettin Mosque
- Coordinates: 41°40′13″N 26°33′55″E

Architecture
- Type: Mosque
- Style: Ottoman architecture
- Completed: 15th century
- Minaret: 1
- Type: Cultural
- Criteria: i, iv

Kadı Bedrettin Mosque, in the provincial center of Edirne, Turkey, was built in the early 16th century by Mevlana Bedrettin Mahmut Efendi, who was the kadi of Edirne during the reign of Suleiman the Magnificent. Some sources indicate that the construction took place in the 1530s.

Mevlana Bedrettin Mahmut Efendi, who had the mosque built, was the father of Şeyhi Çelebi and the sheikhulislam Kadızade Ahmed Şemseddin Efendi. After working as a muderris for a while, Mevlana Bedrettin Mahmut Efendi was appointed to the Kadhiships of Aleppo and Edirne. He died during his tenure as the Kadi of Edirne.

Kadı Bedrettin Mosque, built on a flat land, is located in a large courtyard surrounded by walls. There is the grave of Mevlana Bedrettin Mahmut Efendi, who built the mosque, in the treasury in the north of the mosque. Cut stone and brick were used in the construction of the walls of the mosque. The last congregation place of the square-planned mosque with a single dome and a single minaret is covered with two domes. The Kadı Bedrettin Fountain adjacent to the mosque wall was registered as a cultural asset to be protected by the Edirne Regional Board for the Protection of Cultural Assets with the decision dated 23.11.2020 and numbered 7211.

In the 1752 great Edirne earthquake, the mosque was badly damaged and its dome collapsed, and it was covered with a roof during the restoration. After the 1953 earthquake, the wooden roof was replaced with a dome and the last congregation place domes were completed. The last restoration of the mosque started in 2017. After 3 years of restoration, the mosque was reopened for worship in 2021.
