= Certain accursed ones of no significance =

"Certain accursed ones of no significance" is the term used by Taşköprüzade in the Shaqāʾiq al-Nuʿmāniyya to describe some members of the Hurufiyya who became intimate with the Sultan Mehmed II to the extent of initiating him as a follower.

This alarmed members of the Ulema, particularly Mahmud Pasha Angelović, who then consulted Fahreddin-i Acemi. Fahreddin hid in the Sultan's palace and heard the Hurufis propound their doctrines. Considering these heretical, he reviled them with curses. The Hurufis fled to the Sultan, but Fahreddin's denunciation of them was so virulent that Mehmed II was unable to defend them. Farhreddin then took them in front of the Üç Şerefeli Mosque, Edirne, where he publicly condemned them to death. While preparing the fire for their execution, Fahreddin accidentally set fire to his beard. However the Hurufis were burnt to death.

According to Bektashi tradition, ʿAli al-A‘la (also ʿAli’ul-Âlâ) who had introduced Hurufi beliefs and literature as if this was the secret message of Hajji Bektash into Bektashiyyah tariqat, was one of the "Certain accursed ones of no significance" and the groom of Fażlu l-Lāh Astar-Ābādī (Nāimī).
