= ʽAlī al-Aʽlā =

Folllower of Fazlallah Astarabadi

ʽAlī al-Aʽlā (d.1419) was a follower of Fazlallah Astarabadi and a prominent proponent of Hurufism. He had a prodigious literary output and is esteemed by the Bektashi as the missionary who brought Astarabadi material to them.

== Works ==
- Book of the Divine Footstool
