= Fahreddin-i Acemi =

15th-century Islamic cleric

Personal life
- Born: Iran
- Died: Ottoman Empire
- Main interest(s): Fiqh, Hadith
- Notable work(s): Persecution of Hurûfîs

Religious life
- Religion: Islam
- Denomination: Sunni
- Jurisprudence: Hanafi

Senior posting
- Influenced: * Ottoman scholars and statesmen

Fahreddin-i Acemi or Fahreddin Acemî or Molla Fakhr al-Dīn al-‘Ajamī was a 15th-century Ottoman Islamic scholar and Shaykh al-Islam.

Little clear information is available about Fahreddin's life. His given name may have been Ibrahim Razi. He studied, possibly under Seyyid Şerif, in an Acem or Ajam land (a Persian-speaking country), thus his nisba Acemî or ‘Ajamī.

Fahreddin came to the Ottoman Empire possibly during reign of Mehmed I. At some point he came to Bursa and became muid (teaching assistant) of Mehmed Şah (son of Molla Fenari) at the Sultan Madrasa (the madrasa of Mehmed I). He received his license in hadith from Burhaneddin Haydar Herevi. At some point, he became mufti, probably during the reign of Murad II, possibly in 1431 or 1440-41 (but no latter than 1444).

As mufti, Fahreddin is said to have played an important role in reducing Hurufi influence in the Ottoman Empire. Possibly in the year 1444, a Hurufi, possibly Ali ul Ala, seems to have become influential with Sultan Mehmed II. When a vizier named Mahmud (possibly Kassabzade Mahmud Bey or Grand Vezir Mahmud Paşa) expressed his concerns to Fahreddin, they devised a plan to deal with the threat to orthodoxy. Fahreddin hid himself in a place where the Hurufi and his followers would be speaking--either the sultan's palace or Mahmud Paşa's house--so that he could hear for himself their ideas. After listening, Fahreddin came out of hiding, told them their errors, and then condemned them harshly in the presence of the sultan. Fahreddin then went to the Üç Şerefeli Mosque, where he either debated the Hurufis before the public or preached a sermon against them from the minbar of the mosque. He issued a fatwa calling for their death by burning. He is said to have been so eager to fan the flames that his beard caught fire.

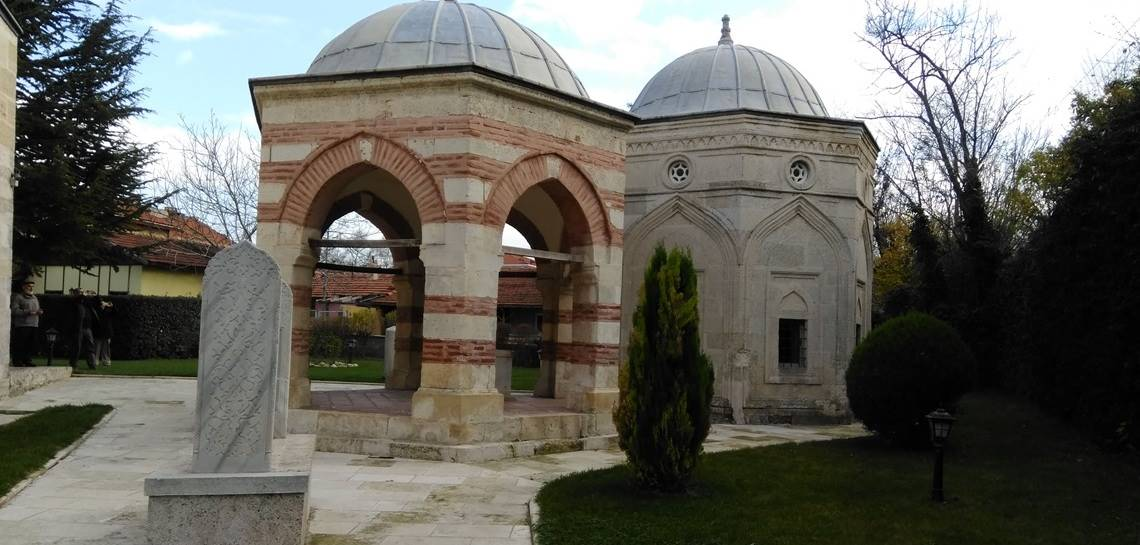
Tomb of Fahreddin-i Acemi

Fahreddin may have taught at the Dârülhadîs Madrasa in Edirne. His students may have included Hocazade, and Molla Arab may have been his muid.

Fahreddin built a small mosque (mescit) and a madrasa in Edirne. Neither is extant now.

Fahreddin died maybe in 1460-61, maybe in 1465-66, or maybe on December 20, 1468. He is buried outside the mihrab of the Dârülhadîs Mosque in Edirne.
