= Haydar Amuli =

Shi'ite mystic and Sufi (1319–1385)

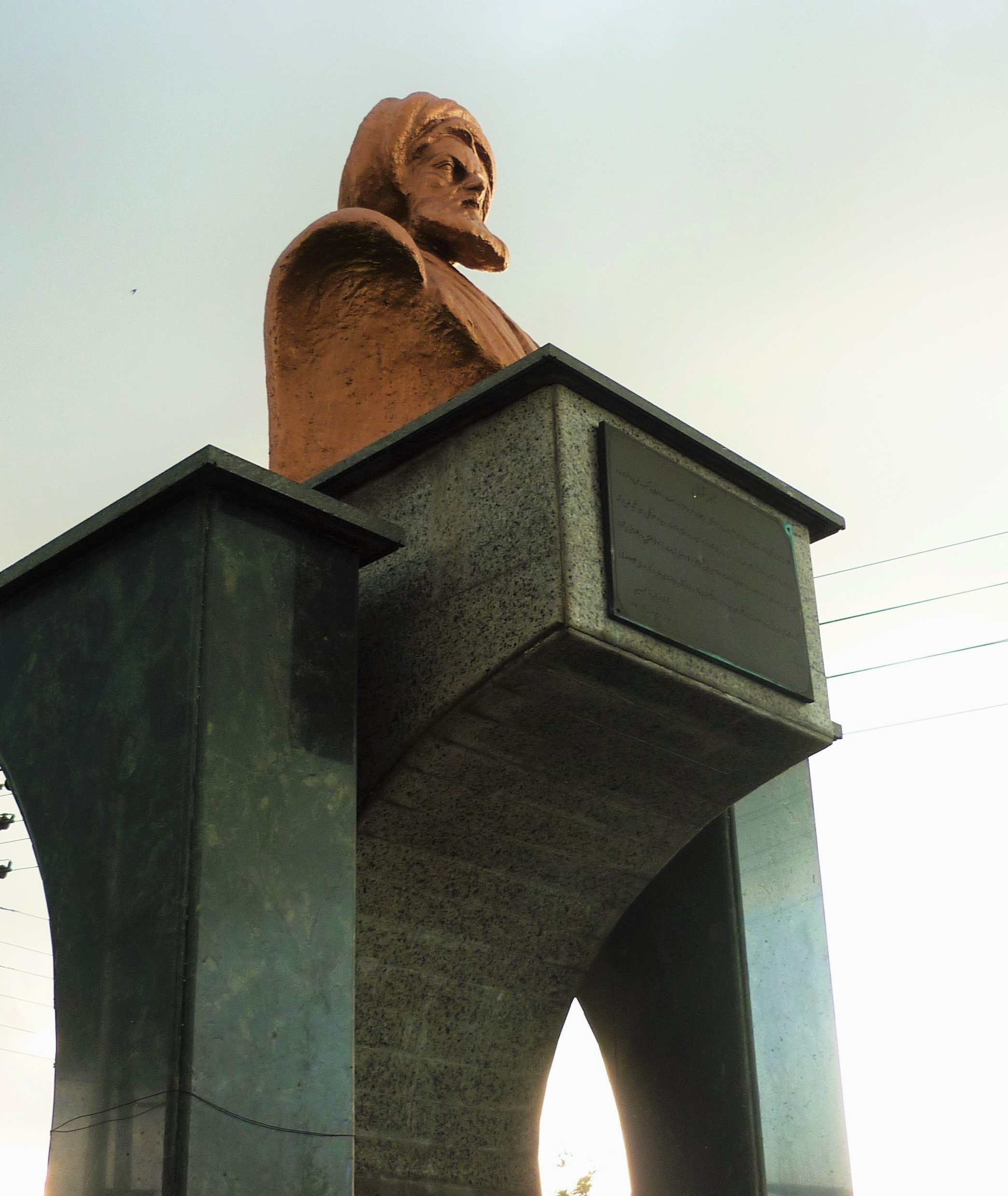
- His statue of Iran
- Born: 1319 CE; Amol, Iran
- Died: 1385 (aged 65–66) CE; Najaf, Iraq

Philosophical work
- Era: 14th century
- Main interests: Shi'ism, Hermeticism, Sufism, Philosophy, Mysticism

Sayyid Baha al-Din Haydar, Haydar al-'Obaidi al-Hossayni Amuli, Sayyed Haydar Amoli, or Mir Haydar Amoli (Persian: میر حیدر آملی) was a Shi'ite mystic, philosopher, and early representative of Shi'a mystic philosophy, being considered one of the most distinguished commentators of the mystic philosopher Ibn Arabi, during the 14th century.

== Biography ==
=== Early life ===
Haydar Amuli belongs to the Hussayni Sayyid family and hails from the town of Amol, in Mazandaran, located in the north of present-day Iran, close to the Caspian Sea. The town of Amul at the time was known to be heavily populated by Shi'ite Muslims. At a very young age he started studying Imam Shi'ism and attended the juridical school of madhhab where he also devoted his time to Sufism, until around the age of thirty. Haydar Amuli first began his studies in his home town of Amul. He eventually moved on to the town of Astarabad, located near Mazandaran, and then Isfahan, located in the centre of Iran. In his early twenties, Sayyid Haydar Amuli returned to Amul and became a trusted confidant and eventually a special deputy and chamberlain to the Bavandid Hasan II, who was the ruler of Tabaristan. Even though Amuli had a close relationship with Hasan II, he experienced a religious crisis. Amuli quotes in his work Inner Secrets of the Path that he started to feel that he was corrupt and that he needed to move to a place where he could fully devote himself to God. So Haydar Amuli gave up his position in the court to further pursue Sufism. He abandoned the courtly life, a couple of years before Hasan II was assassinated by members of his own family.

=== Return to Sufism ===
After Haydar Amuli's departure from the court, he began practicing Sufism. Living in the village of Tihran, he began to follow a shaykh by the name of Nur al-Din Tihrani, a gnostic and ascetic of Allah. Amuli spent a little less than a month in his company before going on to wear the symbolic Sufi cloak or khirqa. Eventually, Haydar Amuli went on to embark on a pilgrimage or Hajj, going on to visit various Shi'ite shrines and also traveling to Jerusalem as well as the holy cities of Mecca and Medina. Unfortunately, due to ill health, Amuli had to leave Medina . It is documented that he spent the rest of his life in Iraq. For several years he studied in Baghdad amongst important Shi'ite scholars including Fakhr al-Din Muhammad al-Hasan and Nasir al-Din al-Kashani al-Hilli. These two scholars were prominent figures in Shi'ism at the time. Haydar al-Amuli then settled in the Shi'ite city of Najaf, south of Baghdad, for over thirty years until around 1385 CE, the year he was last documented to be living. This is also around the same time that he completed his last work, called Resalat al-olum al-aliya.

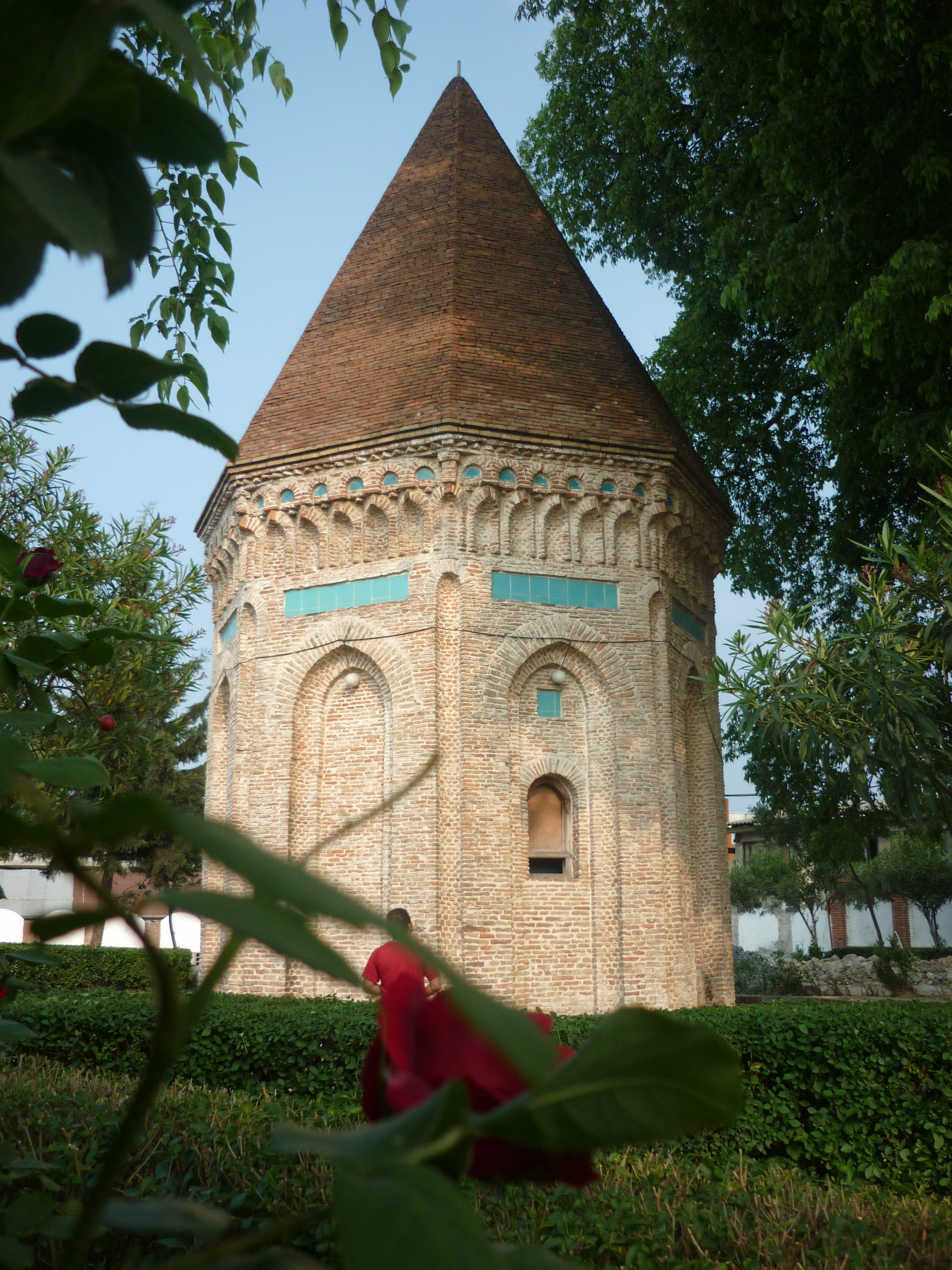
Tomb Sayyid Haydar Amuli (Seyyed se Tan)

== Amuli's Main Ideas ==
=== Synthesis of Shi'ism and Sufism ===
Early on Amuli was a supporter of Imamite Shi’ism. Similar to Sufism, Shi’ism involves the ideas of šarīʿa, ṭarīqa and ḥaqīqa. Amuli believed that every Shi’ite was "a believer put to the test", a central Sufi belief. One of Amuli's main ideas was that the Imams, who were believed to be endowed with mystical knowledge, were not just guides to the Shi’ite community, but also to the Sufi community. Amuli was both a critic of Shi’ites who limited their religion to a set of rules and equally critical of Sufis who denied certain principles that originated with the Imams. Corbin considers him most notable for splitting with Ibn Arabi in introducing a Hermetic worldview into his work, making it more compatible with overall Shi'i thought overall.

=== Pure Monotheism ===
Amuli also implemented and further explained the differences between pure monotheism and the inner aspect. Pure monotheism is constituted by the profession of faith and of the idea of the outward aspect of God's unity. The inner aspect involves the idea that nothing else exists except for God. Amuli metaphorically explained the idea of the inner and outward aspects as ink and the letters that are produced by that ink: the letters by themselves do not exist without the ink, meaning that for him, the physical world is only a reflection of God's divine names. This mediated, more hermetic belief, is widely considered to be what later inspired Fazlallah Astarabadi in his Hurufism.

=== The Seal of Walāya ===
Another doctrine of Amuli related to the arrival of the twelfth Imam, Muhammad al-Mahdi. Amuli's idea of the twelfth Imam follows the ideas of previous scholars. Amuli specifically believed that ‘Ali was the seal of the universal walāya and Mohammadan walāya is, for Amuli, the Mahdī. These ideas differ from that of Ibn ‘Arabi in that al’Arabi believes that Jesus Christ was the seal of the universal walāya.

== Works ==
It is documented that Sayyid Haydar Amuli wrote over forty different works, but of those only seven remain. In Asrār al-šarīʿa wa aṭwār al-ṭarīqa wa anwār al-ḥaqīqa, Amuli individually discusses his five basic principles of religion: divine unity, prophecy, eschatology, Imamate and justice. He also mentions the five pillars of Islam prayer, including fasting, zakāt, haǰǰ, and ǰehād. He discusses all of these topics from three different points of view, the šarīʿa, the ṭarīqa, and the ḥaqīqa. Jāmeʿ al-asrār wa manbaʿ al-anwār is the most famous of Amuli’s writings. It is divided into three books and each book is separated into four chapters or (qāʿeda). al-Masāʾel al-āmolīya (or al-ḥaydarīya) is a work that consists of theological and juridical ideas that are addressed by Amuli written to his teacher Faḵr-al-moḥaqqeqīn. From this work an autograph is preserved. Amuli wrote, Resālat al-woǰūd fī maʿrefat al-maʿbūd, in 1359 CE. It was completed while Amuli was residing in Naǰaf around 1367 CE. al-Moḥīṭ al-aʿẓam is a seven volume commentary that was completed around 1375 or 1376 CE. This work titled, Naṣṣ al-noṣūṣ is a commentary on another piece written by Ibn Arabi, titled Foṣūṣ al-ḥekam. This piece includes some autobiographical passages that provide information about Amuli’s life. Amuli's last work was titled, Resālat al- ʿolūm al-ʿālīya is a collection of Imamite traditions credited to Amuli. It is often debated that it was actually written by a different author.

=== Notable quote ===
"The ocean is the same ocean as it has been of old; The events of today are its waves and its rivers."

"Indeed I swear by Allah that if the seven heavens were made of paper and the trees of the earth were pens, if the seas of the world were ink and the spirits, mankind and the angels were scribes, then they would be unable to write even a jot of what I had witnessed of the divine gnoses and realities"

== Genealogy ==
In Sayyid Haydar Amuli's commentary Al‑Muhit al‑A`zam (The Mighty Ocean, Amuli gives a brief family genealogy.

1. Sayyid Ruknuddin Haydar
2. Sayyid Tajuddin Ali Padashah
3. Sayyid Ruknuddin Haydar
4. Sayyid Tajuddin Ali Padashah
5. Sayyid Muhammad Amir
6. Sayyid Ali Padashah
7. Sayyid Muhammad,
8. Sayyid Zayd
9. Sayyid Muhammad
10. Sayyid Ibrahim
11. Sayyid Muhammad
12. Sayyid Husayn Kusaj
13. Sayyid Ibrahim
14. Sayyid Sanaullah
15. Sayyid Harun
16. Sayyid Hamzah
17. Sayyid Ubaydullah al Iraj
18. Sayyid Husayn Asghar
19. Imam Zayn ul Abidin,
20. Imam Husayn al Shahid ‑
21. Ali ibn Abi Talib".

== Legacy ==
Amuli is not the only Imamite thinker to incorporate the writings of Ibn 'Arabi and his followers. The joining of both Sufism and Shi'ism was further explored throughout history by more scholars like Amuli. Scholars such as, Mir Damad, Mulla Sadra, Hadi Sabzavari, and Ayatollah Khomeini continued to establish a connection between Sufism and Shi’ism.
