= Old Mosque, Edirne =

Mosque in Edirne, Turkey

Old Mosque
- Eski Camii
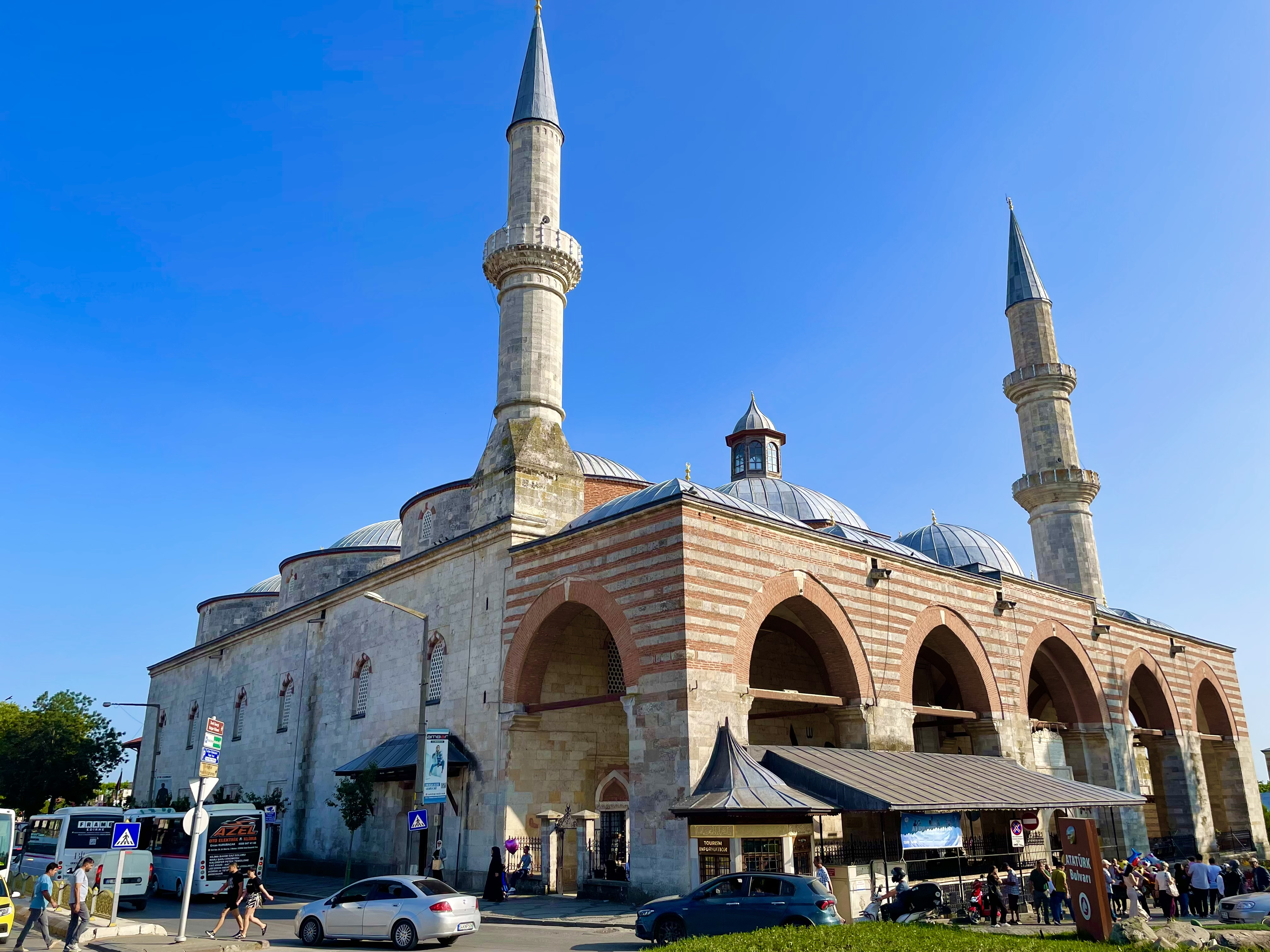

- Location of the mosque in Turkey

Religion
- Affiliation: Sunni Islam

Location
- Location: Edirne, Turkey
- Coordinates: 41.676712°N 26.555704°E

Architecture
- Architects: Haci Alaeddin, Ömer bin Ibrahim
- Type: Mosque
- Style: Ottoman architecture
- Groundbreaking: 1402
- Completed: 1414; 612 years ago

Specifications
- Dome: 9
- Minaret: 2

The Old Mosque (Turkish: Eski Camii), also known as Grand Mosque (Turkish: Ulucami), is an early 15th-century Ottoman mosque in Edirne, Turkey.

== Description ==
It was built from the order of Emir Süleyman, and completed under the rule of his brother, Sultan Mehmet I. The mosque is located in the historical center of the city, near the market and close to other prominent historical mosques, Selimiye Mosque and Üç Şerefeli Mosque. The mosque is covered by 9 domes supported on four columns. The mosque had originally a single minaret, the taller one was later built by Murat II. The mosque without a courtyard is entered through three doors. Inside the mosque large calligraphy works can be seen.

== Gallery ==
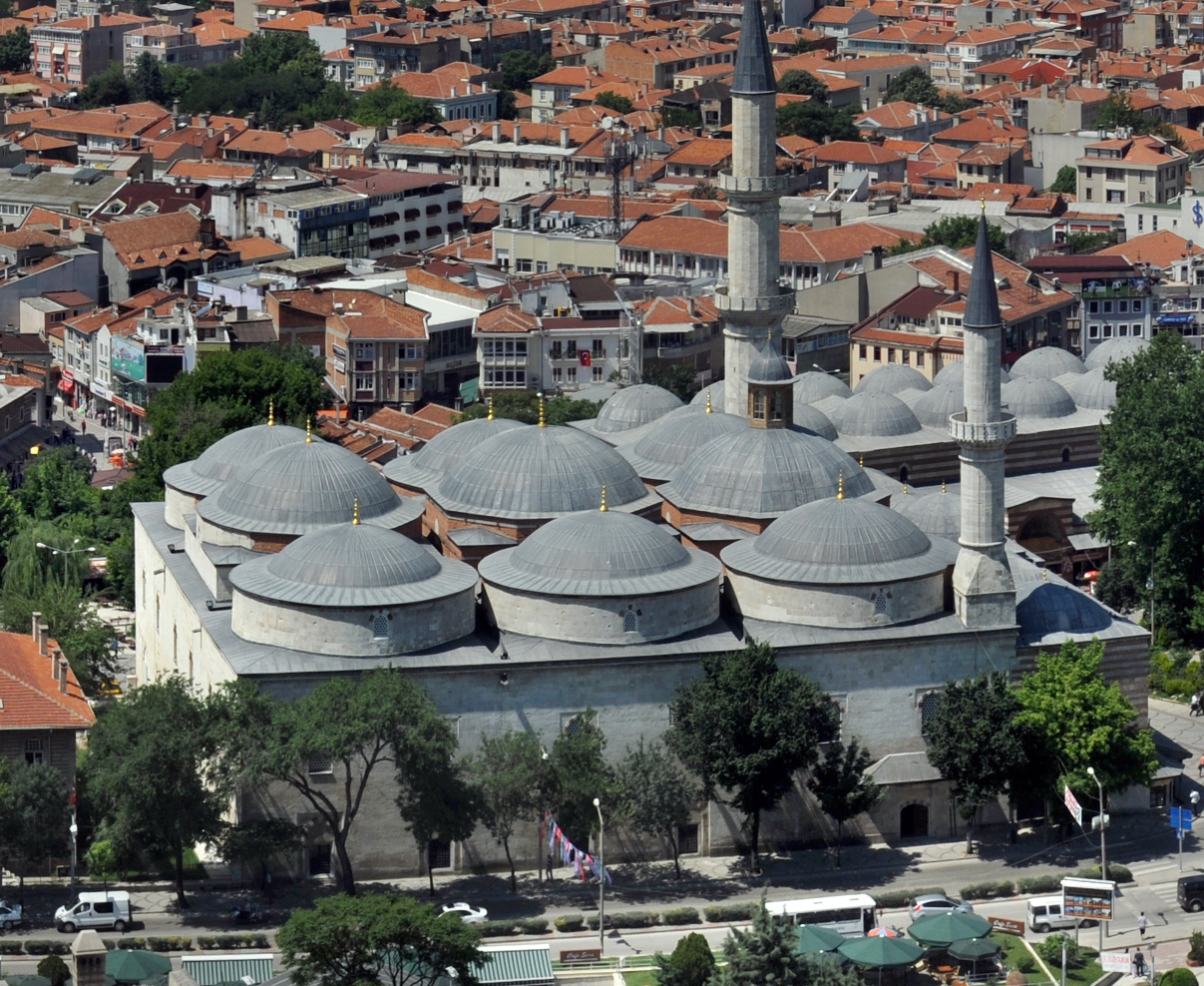
Aerial view of the mosque

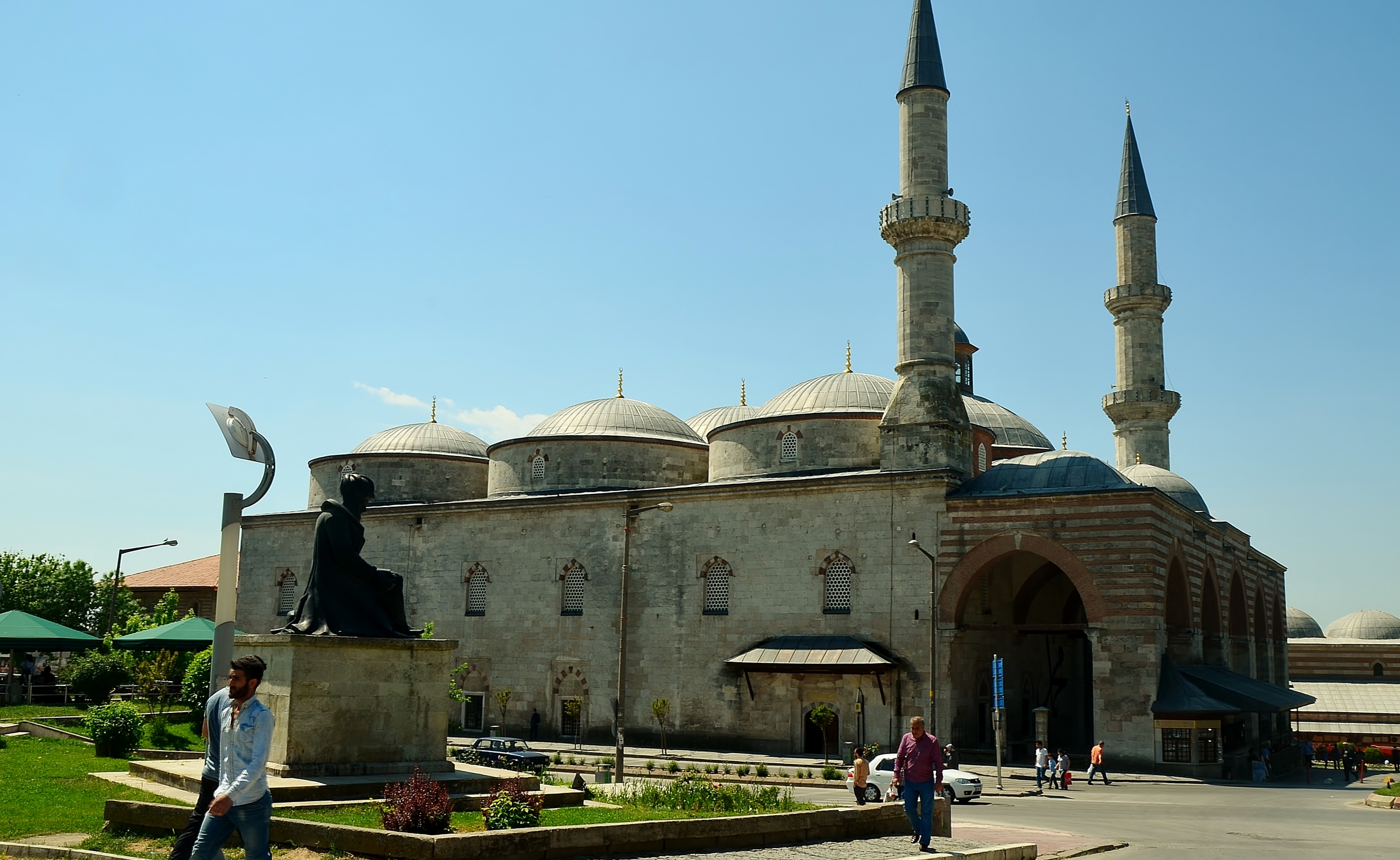
Side view of the mosque, showing the domed prayer hall preceded by a portico (right)

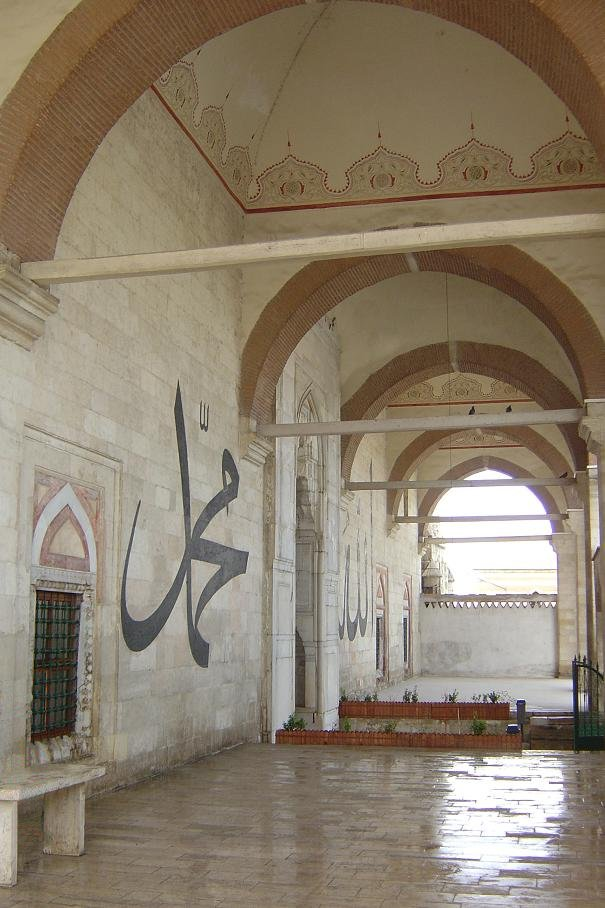
View of the front portico, with mural calligraphy of the word "Muhammad"

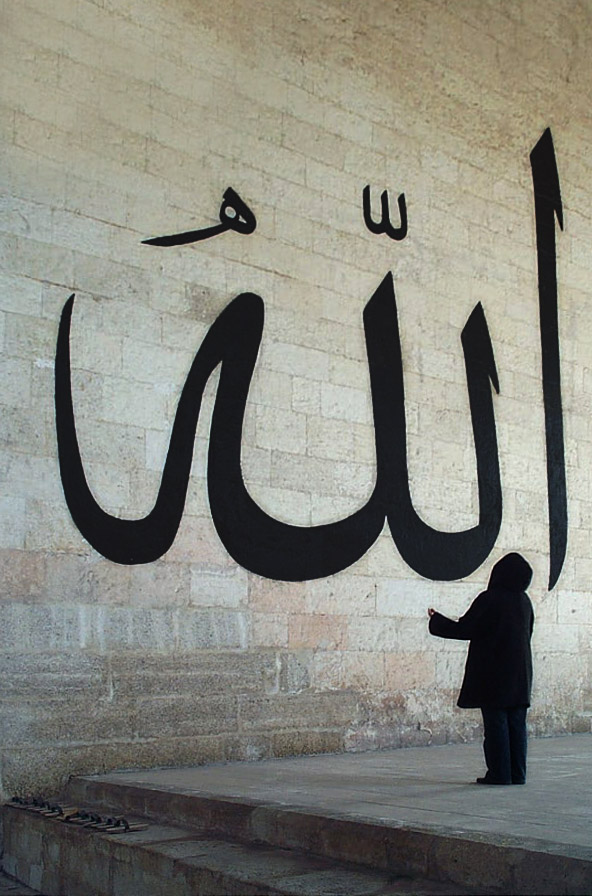
Mural calligraphy of the word "Allah", front portico

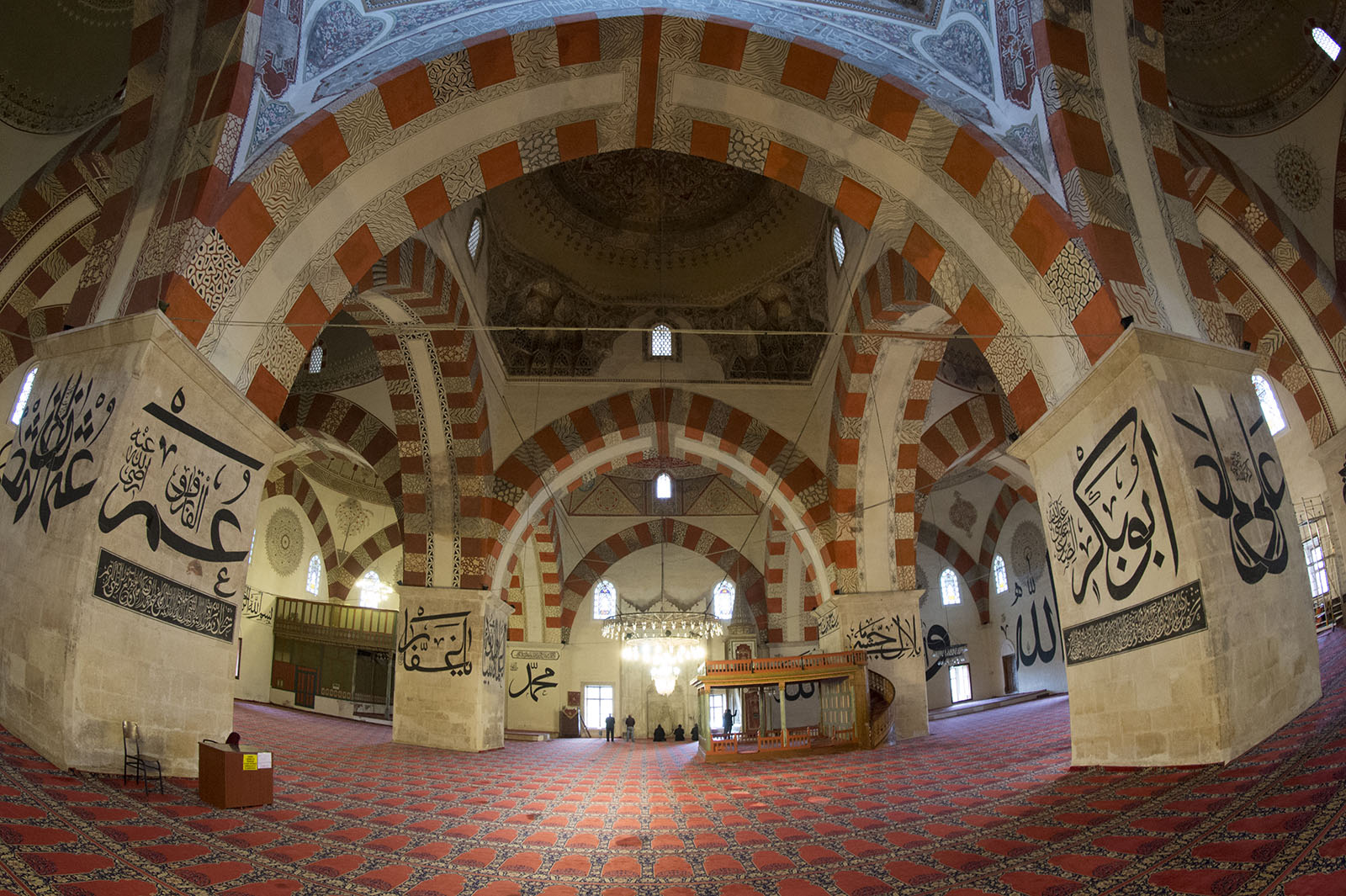
Interior of the mosque, looking from the entrance towards the mihrab

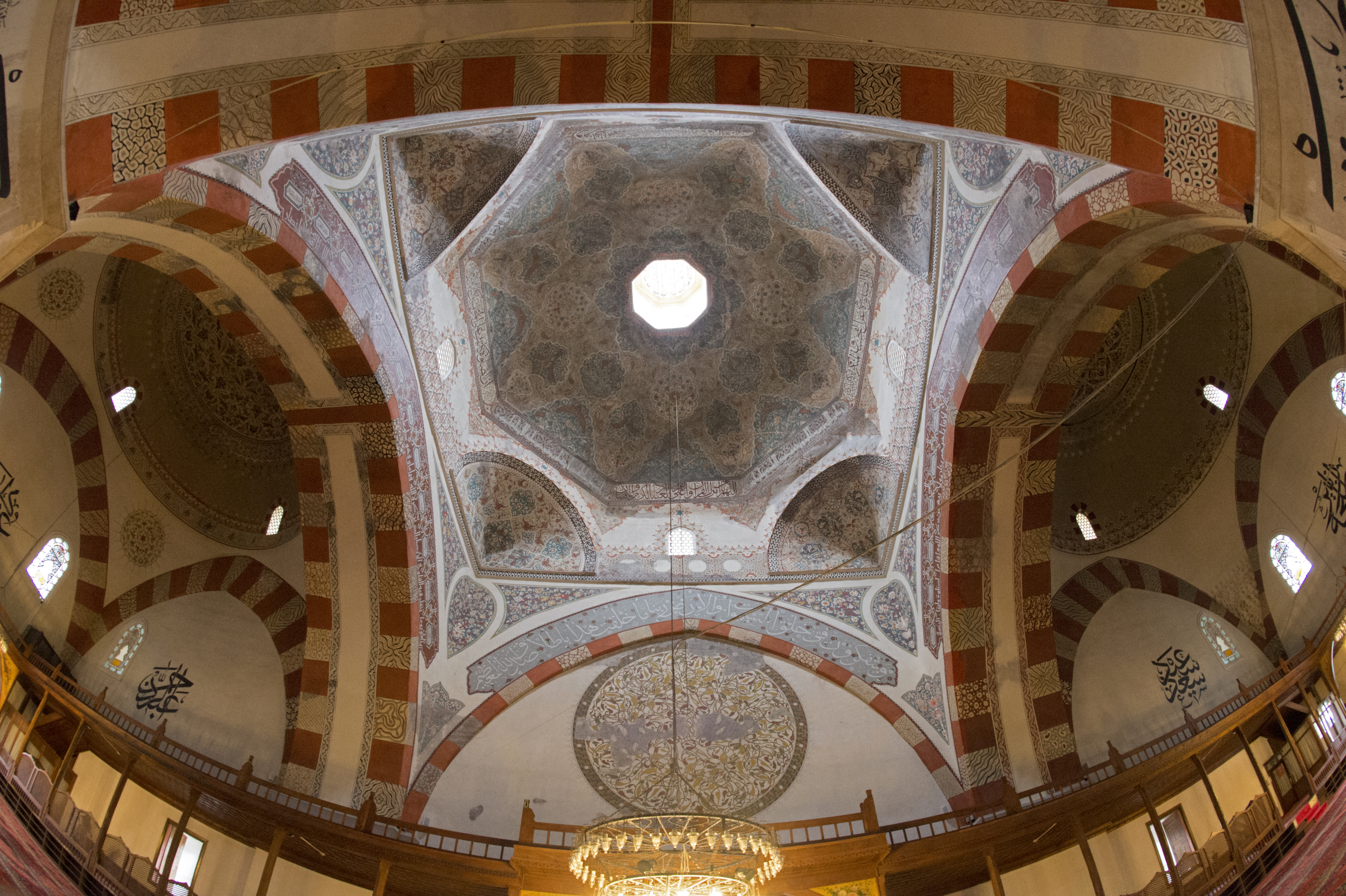
One of the nine domes of the mosque

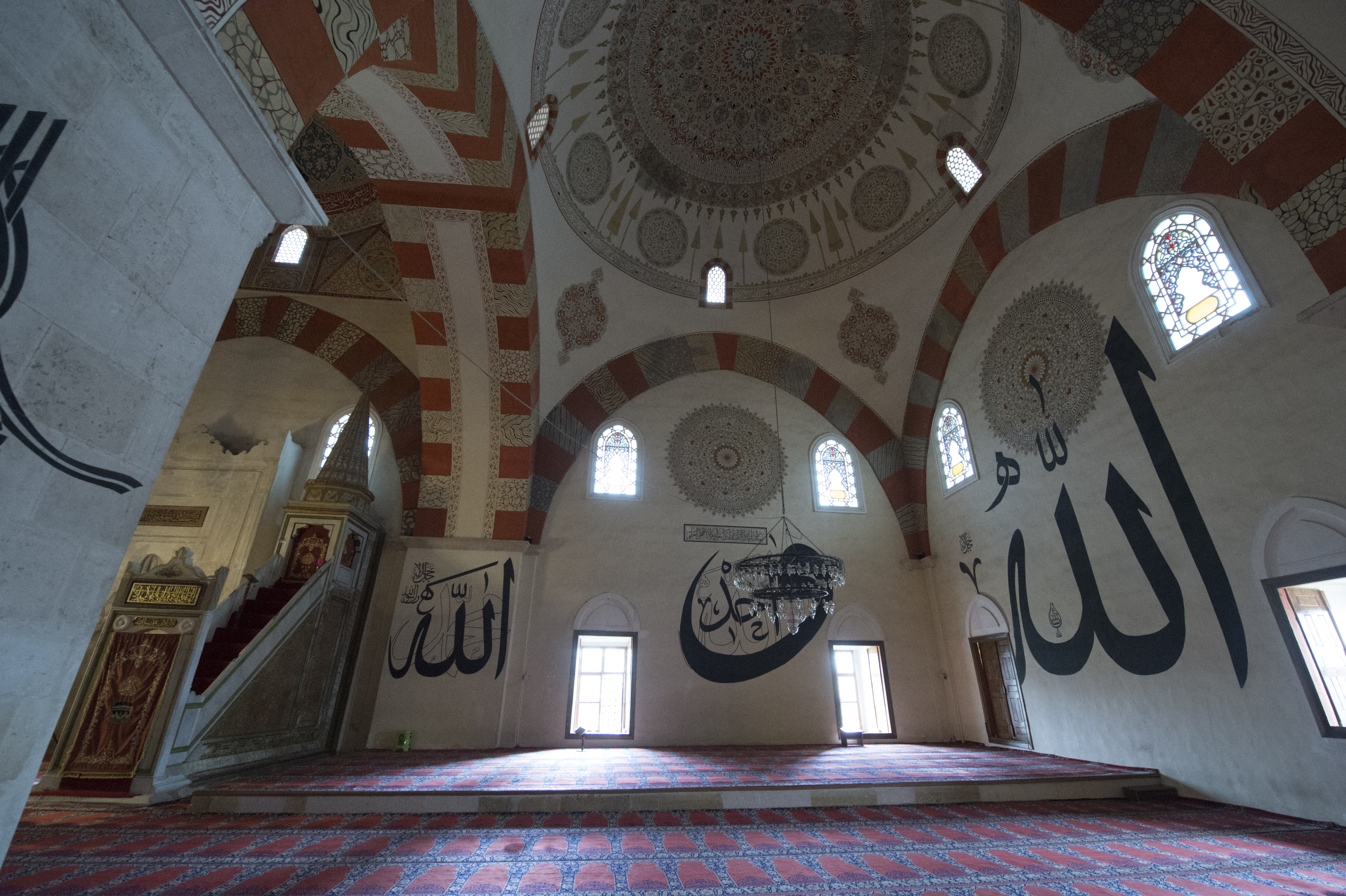
Interior of the mosque (with minbar on the left)

== See also ==
- Early Ottoman architecture
- List of mosques
- List of Turkish Grand Mosques
