= Muradiye Mosque, Edirne =

Mosque in Edirne, Turkey

Muradiye Mosque
- Muradiye Camii
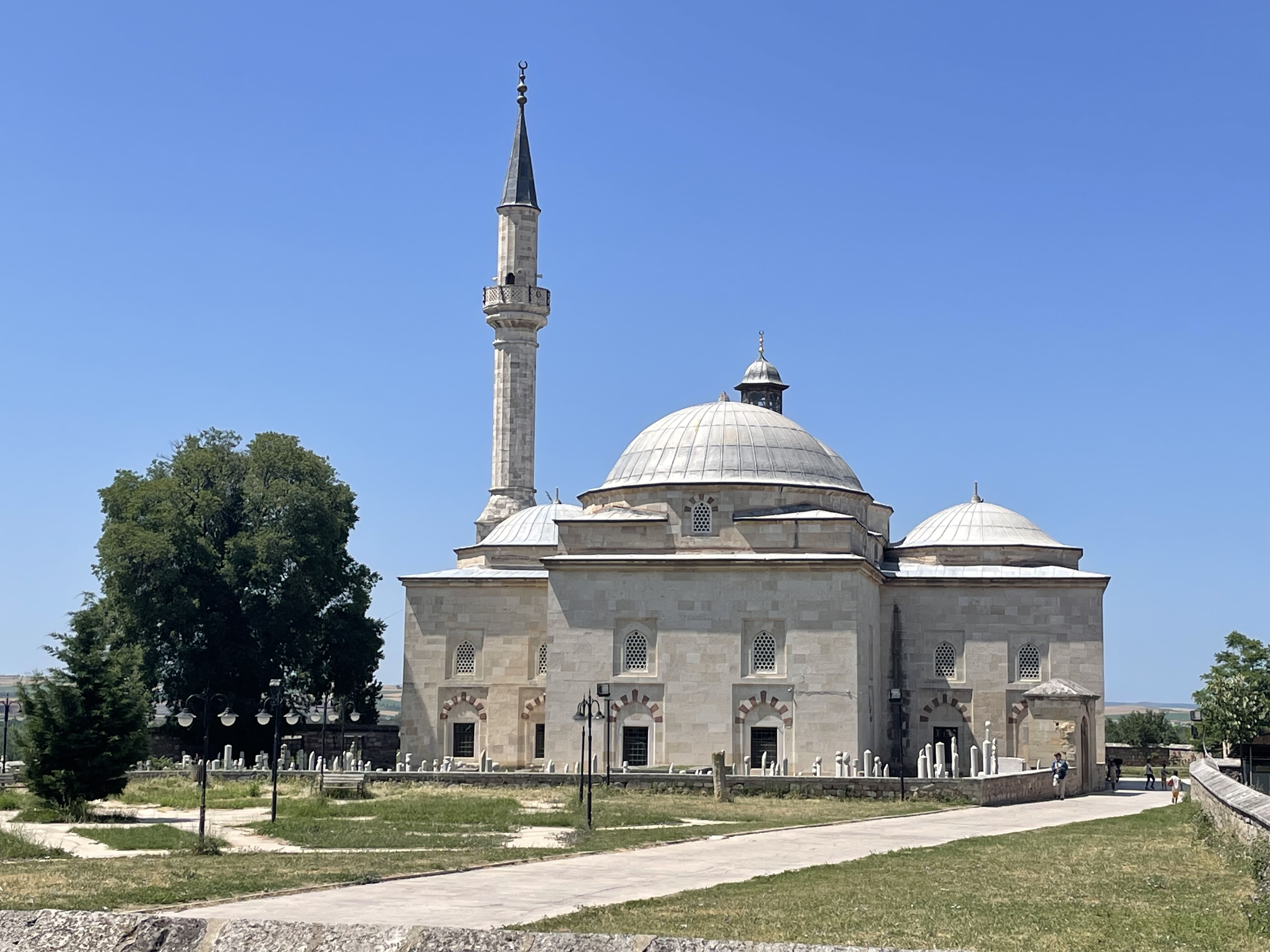
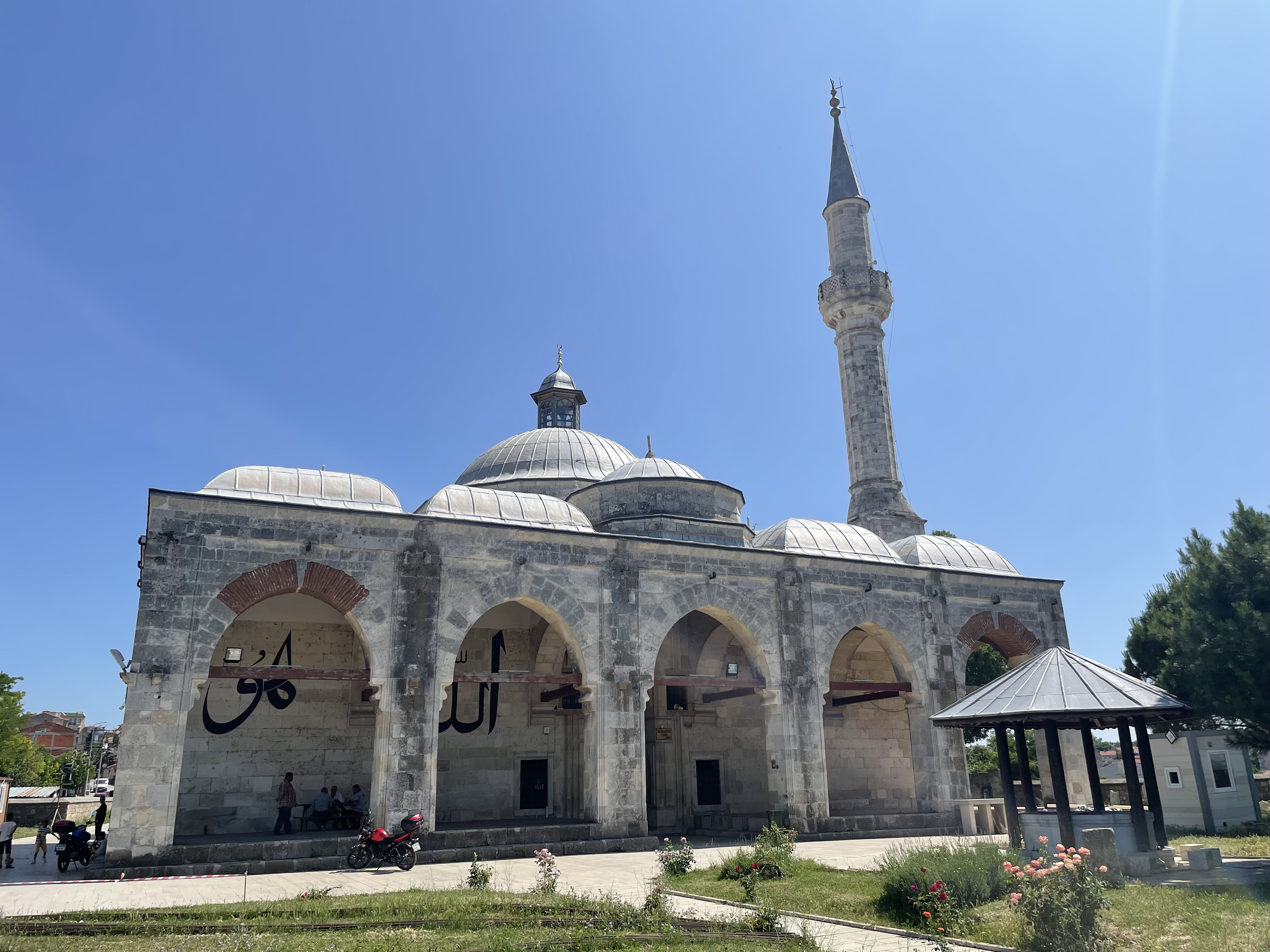

- Location of the mosque in Turkey.

Religion
- Affiliation: Islam

Location
- Location: Edirne, Turkey
- Coordinates: 41°40′56.5″N 26°33′53.3″E

Architecture
- Style: Ottoman
- Completed: 1435-36
- Minaret: 1

The Muradiye Mosque (Turkish: Muradiye Camii) is a 15th-century Ottoman mosque in Edirne, Turkey. The building is noted for the tiles that decorate the mihrab and the walls of the prayer hall.

== Construction and architecture ==
The small mosque was commissioned by Murad II and completed in 1435-6. (Note: Above the entrance doorway under the portico is a stone slab with a carved inscription in Arabic. The slab measures 70 cm (28 in) in height and 180 cm (71 in) in width. The translation given by Dijkema (1977) for the three lines of text is: 1. May the imaret of the Sultan and Son of the Sultan, the Sea of Benefits, Murad, of the line of Osman, be exalted. 2. May it flow with benefits; and the celestial spheres will envy it. Indeed the buildings speak of the zeal of the builder. 3. I ask God that it may stand forever. [dated:] 'May the beneficence of [the] Sultan flow everlasting' The third line includes a chronogram giving a date of AH 839 (27 July 1435 - 15 July 1436).) It originally formed part of a Mevlevi dervish complex but was later converted into a mosque. The complex included a soup kitchen (imaret) and an elementary school (mekteb) but these buildings have not survived. The mosque has a T-shaped plan with a five bay portico and an entrance hall with a domed room on either side. The prayer hall is separated from the entrance hall by a solid arch. The building has been heavily repaired after suffering earthquake damage. The single stone minaret has been rebuilt several times; the present structure dates from 1957.

== Tiles ==
=== Frieze ===
The prayer hall has a tiled frieze around three walls and a large tiled mihrab set between two windows. The frieze is formed of eight rows of blue-and-white hexagonal tiles that are set on their points. Some of the tiles were stolen in 2001 and the gaps have been filled with plaster. The tiles have a creamy white fritware body and cobalt blue designs under a clear transparent glaze. They measure 22.5 cm (8.9 in) across. The very varied designs are arranged haphazardly. Most show the influence of Chinese blue-and-white porcelain produced in the early 14th century during the Yuan dynasty. Before the theft in 2001 there were 479 tiles with 53 different designs. Of these, 15 designs occurred only once while the most common design occurred 54 times. Filling the gaps between the hexagonal tiles are plain turquoise glazed triangles. The borders of the frieze are formed by a row of rectangular tiles. Along the top of the frieze are a series of large blue-and-white moulded palmette tiles.

=== Mihrab ===
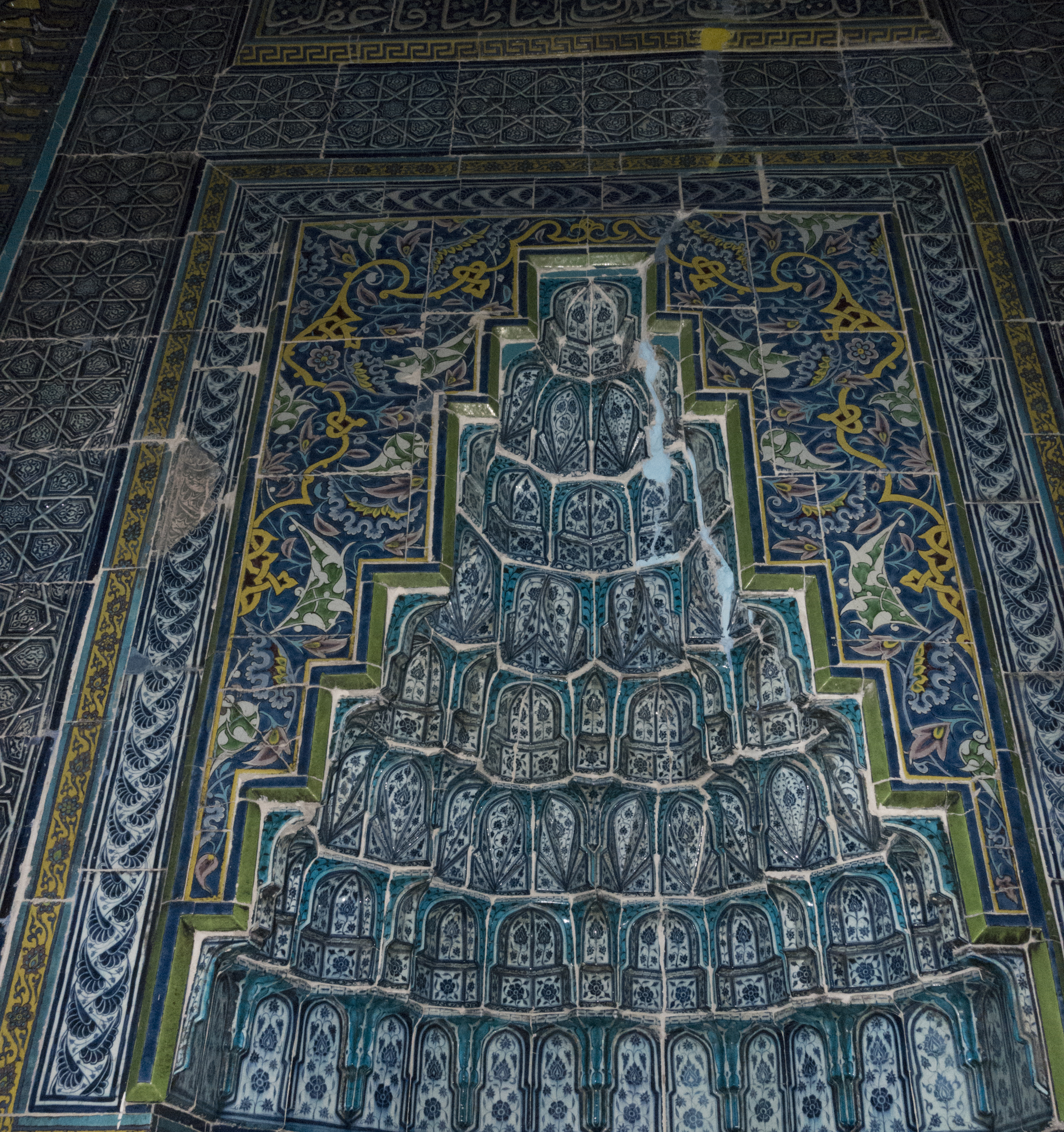
Mihrab with polychrome tiles

The exceptionally large rectangular mihrab is formed of moulded polychrome tiles. (Note: The mihrab has a height of 6.3 m (21 ft) and a width of 3.85 m (12.6 ft).) A tiled inscription on the outer cavetto moulding runs up one side, across the top and down the other side of the mihrab. The cuerda seca cavetto tiles have raised white naskh characters which contrast with the cobalt blue background. Running through the shafts of the naskh characters is a second inscription in yellow Kufic characters. Some of the text on the left side is simply a mirror image of that on the right. The inscriptions include text from the Quran (3:32 - 3:35) and a dedication to Sultan Murad II who ruled between 1421-1444 and again from 1446-1451.

The spandrels of the niche consist of elaborate cuerda sec tiles that are decorated with yellow, apple green, turquoise, mauve and cobalt blue glazes. In contrast, the stalactite vault of the niche is formed by white moulded tiles with an underglaze floral decoration in cobalt blue. Some of the floral chinoiserie designs on these tiles repeat those used on the hexagonal blue-and-white tiles of the frieze.

=== Masters of Tabriz ===
The style of the polychrome cuerda seca tilework of the mihrab is strikingly similar to that of the mihrab in the Yeşil Mosque (built 1419-21) in Bursa and it is therefore considered likely that the tiles were produced by the same team of craftsmen. In Bursa the craftsmen signed the mihrab as "the work of the masters of Tabriz". After completing the tiles of the Muradiye mosque it is believed that the "Masters of Tabriz" also produced the underglaze painted lunette panels of the Üç Şerefeli Mosque (completed in 1447) in Edirne. The blue-and-white hexagonal tiles of the Muradiye Mosque are the earliest example of underglaze painted tiles produced in Ottoman Turkey. They are also the first example of tiles with a frit body produced under the Ottomans.

=== Tile transfer ===
Although the walls of the mosque above the tiled frieze are now whitewashed, some of the original painted wall-decoration has been preserved. From the surviving patches of paintwork it is evident that at some point the walls were redecorated with a different design. Strikingly, the tilework appears to have been placed on the walls after the second layer of wall-painting had been applied. This can be clearly seen where the painting runs behind the blue-and-white palmette tiles of the frieze. (Note: The photograph of the tiled frieze published as Figure 7 on page 22 of Carswell (2006) is flipped left to right. It shows a section of the south-west wall near the minbar before the destruction in 2001. A photograph of the same section in the correct orientation has been published by Yoltar-Yildirim (2009).) The art historian John Carswell has argued that although the date of 1435-6 above the entrance fits with the dedication to Murad II on the mihrab, it is probable that the tiles were transferred to the mosque from an imperial building. As supporting evidence he points to the lack of a coherent pattern to the arrangement of hexagonal tiles and the mixing of the two different styles of rectangular border tiles. The mihrab is also unusually large for the size of the building. Carswell suggests that it is likely that the tiles were original made for a building in the palace complex on the plain below. In 1450 Murad II built a palace complex, the Saray-ı Cedid-i Amire (New Imperial Palace), to the north of the city on an island in the river Tunca. The palace was expanded by successive sultans and in the 17th century accommodated between six and ten thousand people. By the early 19th century much of the palace was in ruinous state and almost nothing now survives.

== Sources ==
- Akçıl, N. Çiçek; Özer, Cebe (2006). "Murâdiye Külliyesi, Edirne'de XV. yüzyılın ilk yarısında inşa edilen külliye" (PDF). Türkiye Diyanet Vakfı İslâm ansiklopedisi, Volume 31 Muhammediyye-Münâzara (in Turkish). Istanbul: Türkiye Diyanet Vakfı İslâm. pp. 199–201. ISBN 978-975389458-6.
- Atasoy, Nurhan; Raby, Julian (1989). Iznik: The Pottery of Ottoman Turkey. London: Alexandra Press. ISBN 978-1-85669-054-6.
- Carswell, John (1972). "Six tiles". In Ettinghausen, Richard (ed.). Islamic Art in the Metropolitan Museum of Art. New York: Metropolitan Museum of Art. pp. 99–124. ISBN 978-087099111-0.
- Carswell, John (2006) [1998]. Iznik Pottery. London: British Museum Press. ISBN 978-0-7141-2441-4.
- Dijkema, F. Th., ed. (1977). The Ottoman Historical Monumental Inscriptions in Edirne. Leiden: Brill. ISBN 90-04-05062-0.
- Gökbilgin, M. Tayyib (1991). "Edirne". Encyclopaedia of Islam, Volume 2 (2nd ed.). Leiden: Brill. pp. 683–686. ISBN 90-04-07026-5.
- Reifstahl, Rudolf M. (1937). "Early Turkish tile revetments in Edirne". Ars Islamica. 4: 249–281. JSTOR 25167042.
- Yoltar-Yildirim, Ayşin (2009). Ottoman Decorative Arts (PDF). Ankara, Turkey: Ministry of Culture and Tourism, Republic of Turkey. ISBN 978-975-17-3446-4.
