= Mahmoud Pasikhani =

Founder of the Nuqtavi movement

Maḥmūd Pasīkhānī (Persian: محمود پسیخانی) was the founder of the Nuqtavi movement in Iran, an offshoot of the Hurūfī movement. He was born in Pasikhān, Iran in Gīlān. Pasikhānī claimed he was the reincarnation of Muḥammad on a higher plane. He declared himself Mahdī in 1397.

Nuqtavi and Shia Islam

== See also ==
- Mahdi
- Isma'ili
- Sufism
- Nāīmee
- Nasīmee
- Hurufiyya
- Shi'a Islam
- Nuktawiyya
- Murād Mīrzā
- Nuqta-yi Ula (Báb)
- List of Ismaili imams
- List of extinct Shia sects
