= Nuqtavi =

Iranian Sufi mystic order in Shia Islam

The Nuqtavi (Persian: نقطویان Nuqṭawiyyah) movement was founded by Mahmoud Pasikhani (Persian: محمود پسیخانی) when he proclaimed himself the Mahdi in 1397. The group is an offshoot of Hurufism, from which Pasīkhānī was expelled for arrogance. The group first arose in Anjudan near Kashan an area known for its Nizari Isma'ili Shia Islam. The group attempted to proclaim Tahmasp I as Mahdi after Pasikhani died.

== Doctrines ==
Mahmoud Pasikhani never married and encouraged celibacy among his followers saying that the celibate have reached the rank of wāḥid, which has the numerical value of nineteen. The Nuqtavis placed an exceptionally heavy emphasis on the number nineteen. They also advanced a cyclical view of time, which is reminiscent of the Isma'ilis. The Nuqtavis held that the total length of the Earth's existence is 64,000 years and that this is divided into four periods of 16,000 years and these in turn are subdivided into two sections of 8,000 years, one an Arab epoch and the other a Persian epoch.

== Intellectual influences ==
The Nuqtavis owe most of their doctrines to the ḥurūfis. Most obviously the personal link between Mahmoud Pasikhani and Fazlallah Astarabadi (d.1394), founder of Hurufism. The notable influences were the obsession with the numerical and phonemic meanings of the letters of the Persian alphabet. Likewise, Astarabadi had proclaimed himself Mahdi as well as Jesus returned. Like many of the Muslim splinter groups in Iran, Hurufis believed that Astarabadi's Javedanname abrogated previous revelation (i.e. the Qur'an).

== Modern influences ==
The writings of Ali Mohammad Shirazi, known as the Báb, contained many codified chronograms, cabbalistic interpretations, talismanic figures, astrological tables, and numerical calculations, some of which appear to be similar to Nuqtavi symbolism. ʿAlī Muḥammad Nāżim al-Sharī‘ah claims that the Báb was taught the Nuqtavi doctrines while imprisoned in Maku and that he incorporated them directly into his Bayán. Saiedi states, however, that while some elements found in the Nuqtavi school are confirmed in the writings of the Báb (Nuqtaye Ula), the literal emphasis that the Nuqtavi school placed on letters as direct elements of divine creation are foreign to the Báb's teachings; his teachings have little to do with the issue of the actual letters or their literal divine character, but instead, concern a mystical world view where the sacred character of human beings is the image of God.

Nuqtavi and Shia Islam

== See also ==
- Mahdi
- Isma'ili
- Sufism
- Nāīmee
- Nasīmee
- Hurufiyya
- Shi'a Islam
- Murād Mīrzā
- Nuqta-yi Ula (Báb)
- Mahmoud Pasikhani
- List of extinct Shia sects
