= Ahmed Lur =

Follower of Hurufism (died 1426)

Ahmed Lur was a primary Luri follower of the Hurufism school of Sufi Islam in 15th century in Iran. He was one of the disciples of Fazlallah Na'imi, the founder of the Hurufism sect.

Ahmed Lur also attempted to assassinate the Timurid ruler, Shahrukh Mirza. Though Shahrukh was injured in the altercation, the attack ultimately failed to kill him.

== Biography ==
His hometown was in Luristan. The Timurid era historian Hafiz-i Abru mentioned Ahmed Lur as a commander of Ahmad Jalayir, the Jalayirid ruler of Iraq. Ahmed Lur was accompanied by Jalayirid sultan in his last military campaign in Azerbaijan. Jalayir was killed in this war. As a result, Ahmed Lur decided to go to Shirvan and finally he settled in Herat, the Timurid dynasty's capital city.

Lur started weaving hats in a simple booth. Apparently, this occupation (weaving the hats) had a special sacred place among the followers of Hurufism. As Ahmed immediately communicated with the followers of the Hurufism sect after entering Herat, it seems likely that Ahmed was already familiar with the sect before going to Herat and perhaps even while in Azerbaijan.

== Efforts to kill Shahrukh ==
Sheykh Fazlallah Astarabadi, the founder of the Hurufism sect was killed by Miran Shah, son of Timur in 1393. As a result, a group of followers of Hurufism in the Timurid territory started revenge-seeking fights against the Timurid rulers.

While he wearing a shepherd's coat, Ahmed attacked Shahrukh Mirza, the brother of Miran Shah on the pretext of delivering a letter of complaint in Herats main mosque. The king was badly injured by the knife attack but ultimately survived. Ahmed was killed by a friend of Shahrukh Mirza, Ali Sultan Qouchin in 1426.

After this incident, Shahrukh's emirs used this opportunity to repress the followers of Hurufism, leading to many being killed and even burned. A well-known calligrapher at Shahrukh's court was accused of having been a friend of Ahmed and was sentenced to prison. These persecutions eventually reached the point where the famous Persian poet, Qasem-e Anvar was exiled to Samarqand due to his diwan being found in Ahmed Lur's booth.
