= Al-Mohit al-azam =

Commentary on the Quran written by Sayyid Haydar Amuli

- Author: Sayyid Haydar Amuli
- Original title: المحیط الأعظم
- Language: Arabic
- Subject: Qur'anic exegesis (Tafsir)
- Genre: Islamic literature
- Publisher: Nur 'Ala Nur
- Publication date: 1375-1376 CE
- Publication place: Iran
- Media type: Print
- Pages: 7 volumes

Al-Moḥīṭ al-aʿẓam (Arabic: المحیط الأعظم) is a seven-volume commentary on the Quran written by Sayyid Haydar Amuli that was completed around 1375 or 1376 CE.

== Exegetic method ==
The commentary is premised on Ibn Arabi teachings. In Al-Mohit al-azam, the author brings the Shi'a and the Sufi traditions together. This exegesis includes both esoteric and exoteric approaches.
