= Üç Şerefeli Mosque =

Mosque in Edirne, Turkey

- Üç Şerefeli Camii
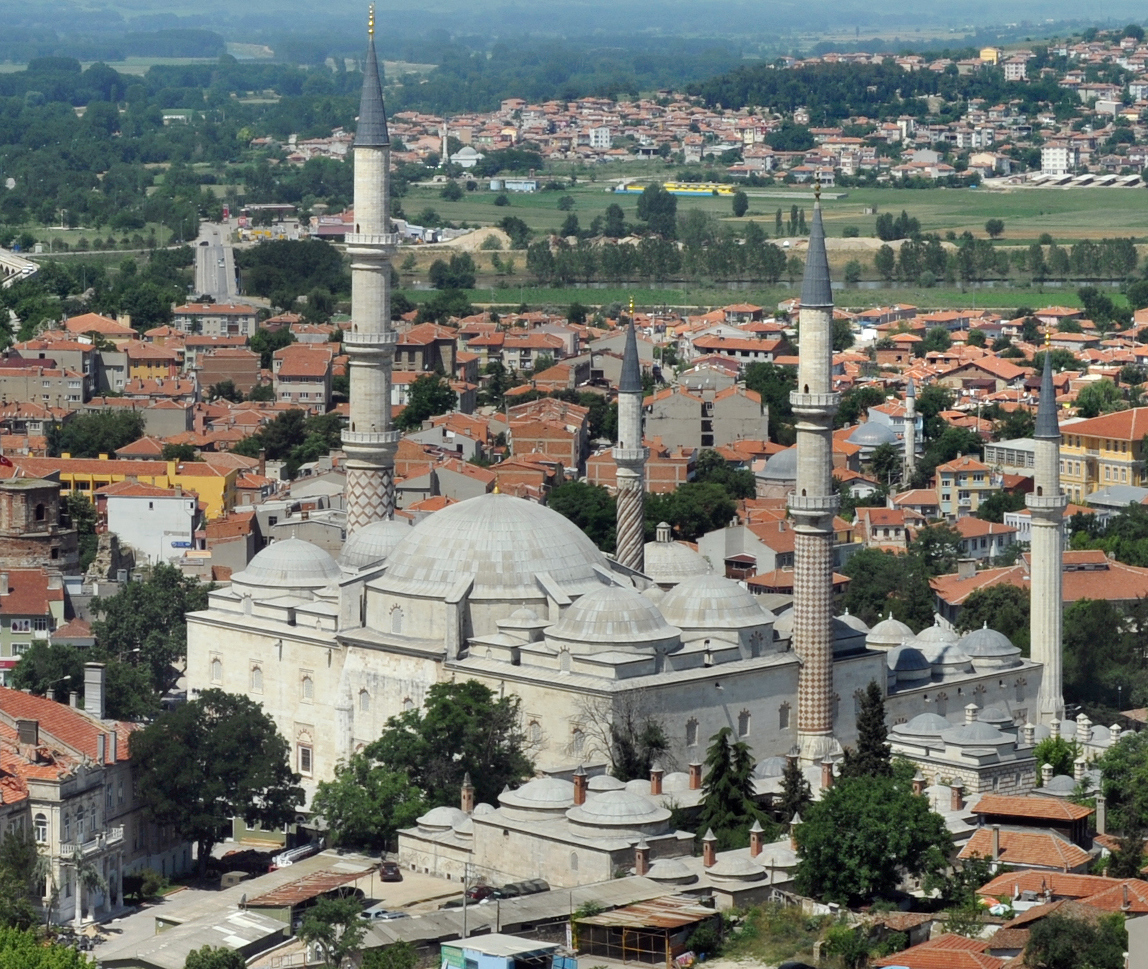

- Location of the mosque in Turkey.

Religion
- Affiliation: Islam

Location
- Location: Edirne, Turkey
- Coordinates: 41°40′41.1″N 26°33′12.7″E

Architecture
- Type: Mosque
- Style: Ottoman architecture
- Groundbreaking: 1438
- Completed: 1447

Specifications
- Dome dia. (outer): 24 m
- Minaret: 4
- Minaret height: 67 m (tallest)
- Materials: limestone

The Üç Şerefeli Mosque (Turkish: Üç Şerefeli Camii) is a 15th-century Ottoman mosque in Edirne, Turkey.

== History ==
The Üç Şerefeli Mosque was commissioned by Ottoman sultan Murad II (r. 1421–1444, 1446–1451), and built between 1438 and 1447. It is located in the historical center of the city, close to the Selimiye Mosque and Old Mosque. The name refers to unusual minaret with three balconies (Turkish: üç şerefeli). It was originally called the New Mosque (Yeni Cami) to distinguish it from the city's Old Mosque (Eski Cami) nearby.

In the Şakaiki Numaniye Taşköprüzade relates how 'Certain accursed ones of no significance' were burnt to death in front of the mosque by Mahmut Paşa who accidentally set fire to his beard in the process.

The mosque was severely damaged by fire in 1732 and by an earthquake in 1752 but was repaired and partly reconstructed on the order of Mahmud I.

== Architecture ==
=== Design ===
The Üç Şerefeli Mosque is one of the most important mosques of this period of early Ottoman architecture. It has a very different design from preceding mosques. The floor plan is nearly square but is divided between a rectangular courtyard and a rectangular prayer hall. The courtyard has a central fountain and is surrounded by a portico of arches and domes, with a decorated central portal leading into the courtyard from the outside and another one leading from the courtyard into the prayer hall. The prayer hall is centered around a huge dome which covers most of the middle part of the hall, while the sides of the hall are covered by pairs of smaller domes. The central dome, 24 meters in diameter (or 27 meters according to Doğan Kuban), is much larger than any other Ottoman dome built before this. The mosque, which is built in cut stone (particularly Burgaz limestone) and makes use of alternating bands of coloured stone for some of its decorative effects, also marks the decline of the use of alternating brick and stone construction seen in earlier Ottoman buildings. Its architect is not known.

On the outside, this design results in an early example of the "cascade of domes" visual effect seen in later Ottoman mosques, although the overall arrangement here is described by Sheila Blair and Jonathan Bloom as not yet successful compared to later examples. The mosque has a total of four minarets, arranged around the four corners of the courtyard. Its southwestern minaret, at over 67 metres (220 ft) tall, was the tallest Ottoman minaret built up to that time and it features three balconies, from which the mosque's name derives.

The two blue and turquoise underglaze-painted tile panels in the tympana of the courtyard windows were probably produced by the same group of tilemakers who had decorated the Yeşil Mosque (1419–21) in Bursa, where the tiles are signed as "the work of the masters of Tabriz" (ʿamal-i ustadan-i Tabriz). The running pattern of the Chinese influenced floral border tiles is similar to those in the smaller and slightly earlier Murad II Mosque in Edirne.

Elements of the mosque

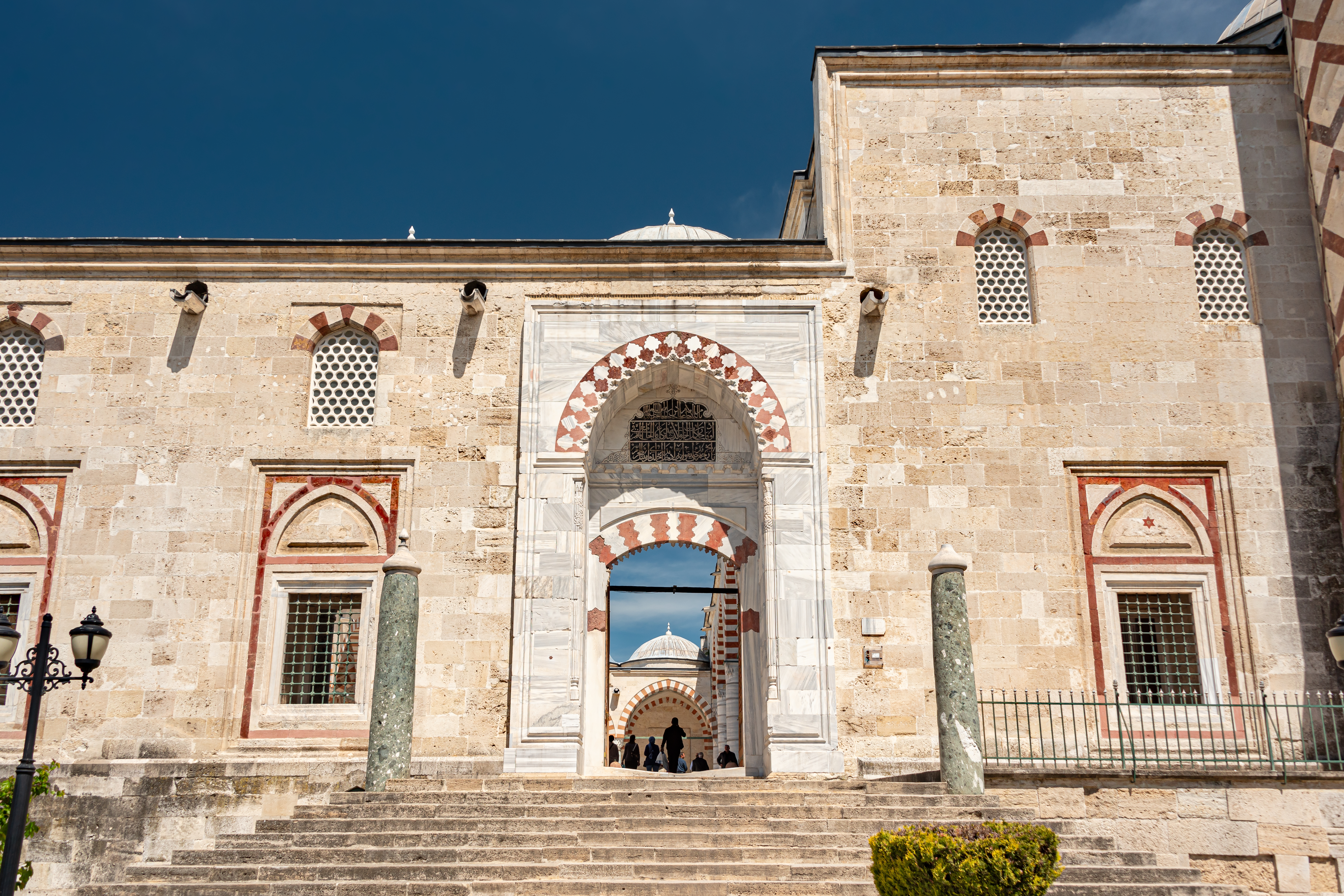
One of the lateral entrances into the mosque

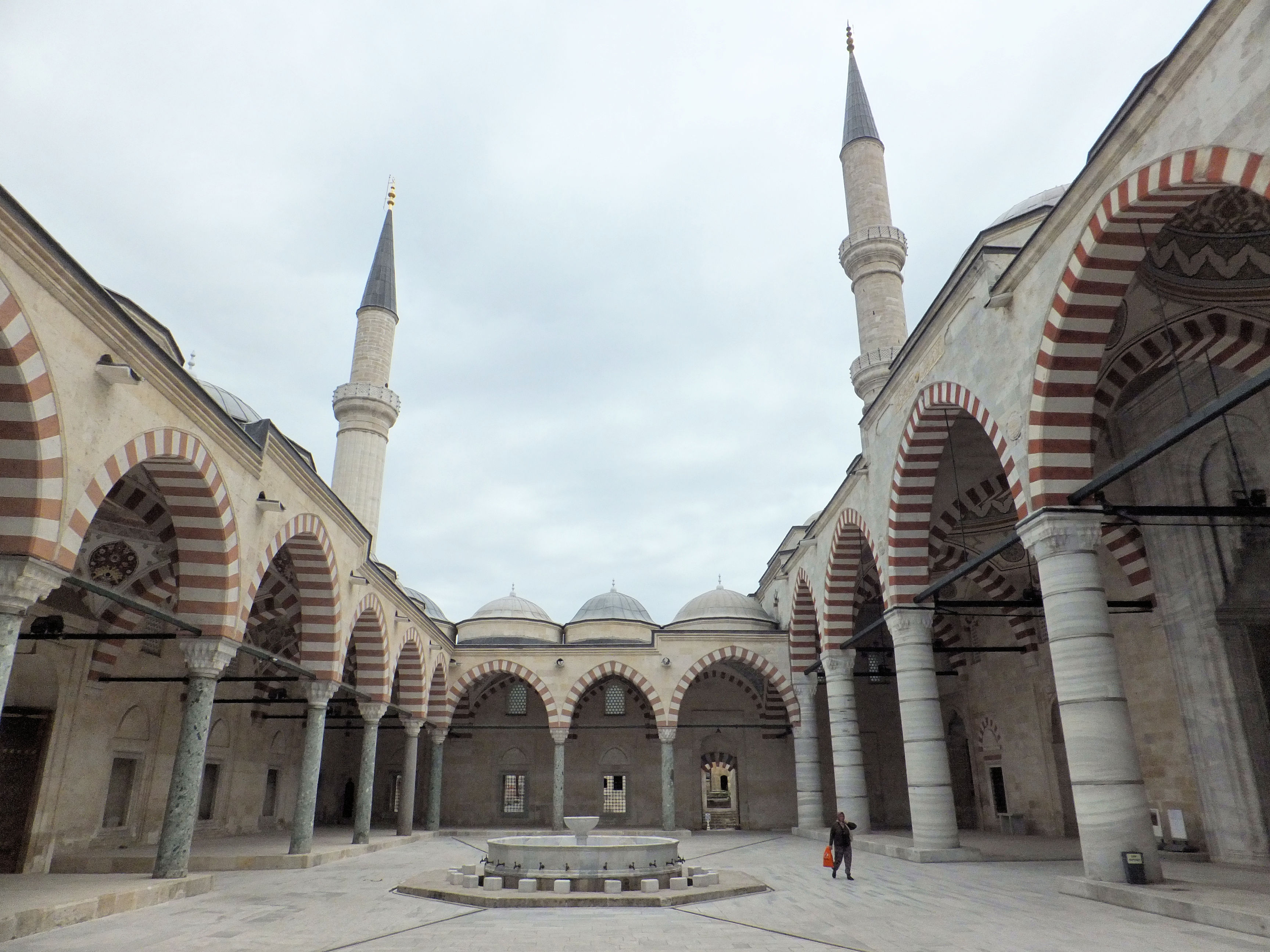
The courtyard

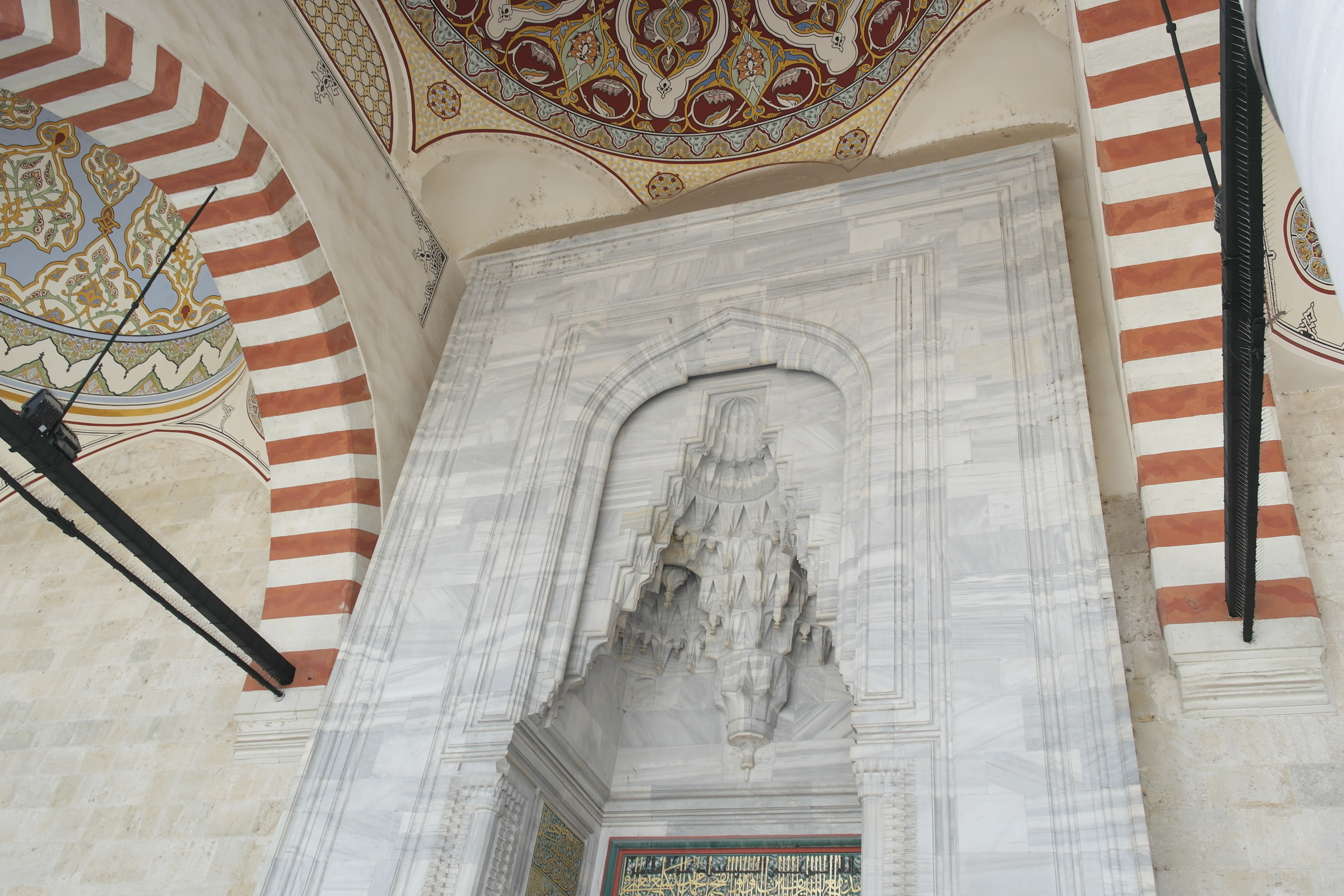
Entrance portal to the prayer hall, with muqarnas stonework

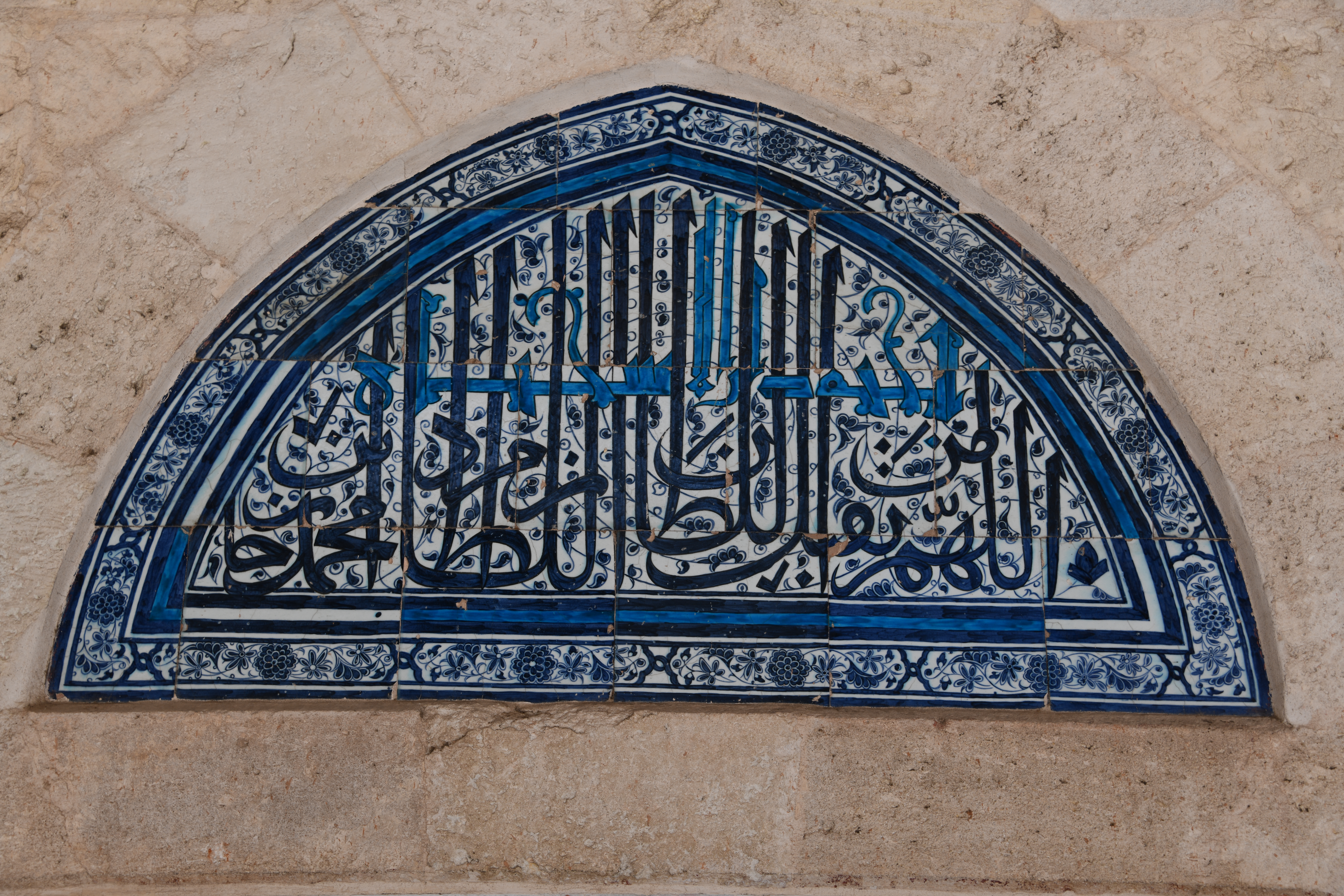
Tile decoration above one of the courtyard windows

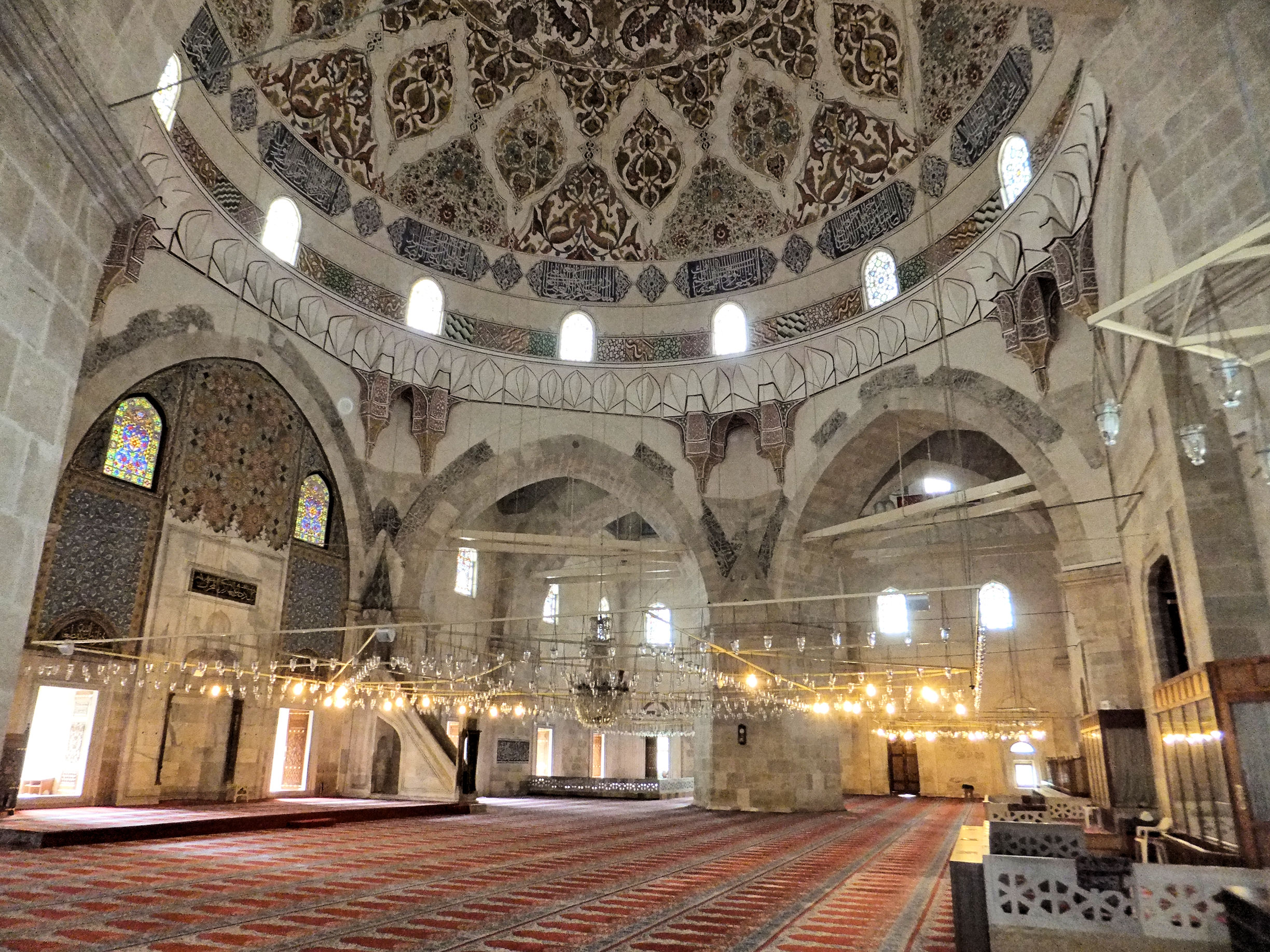
Interior of the prayer hall (with mihrab and minbar on the left)

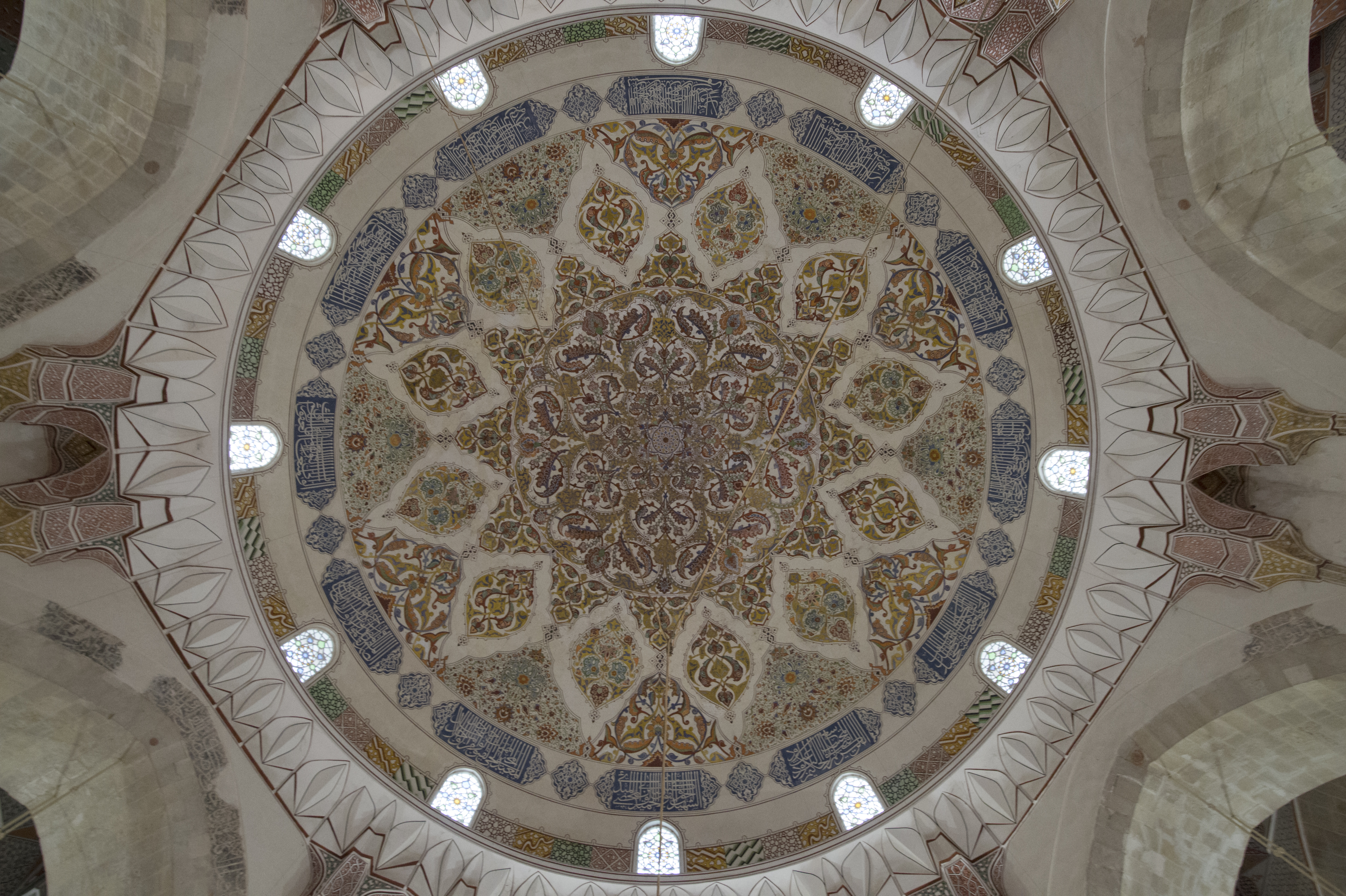
The main (central) dome

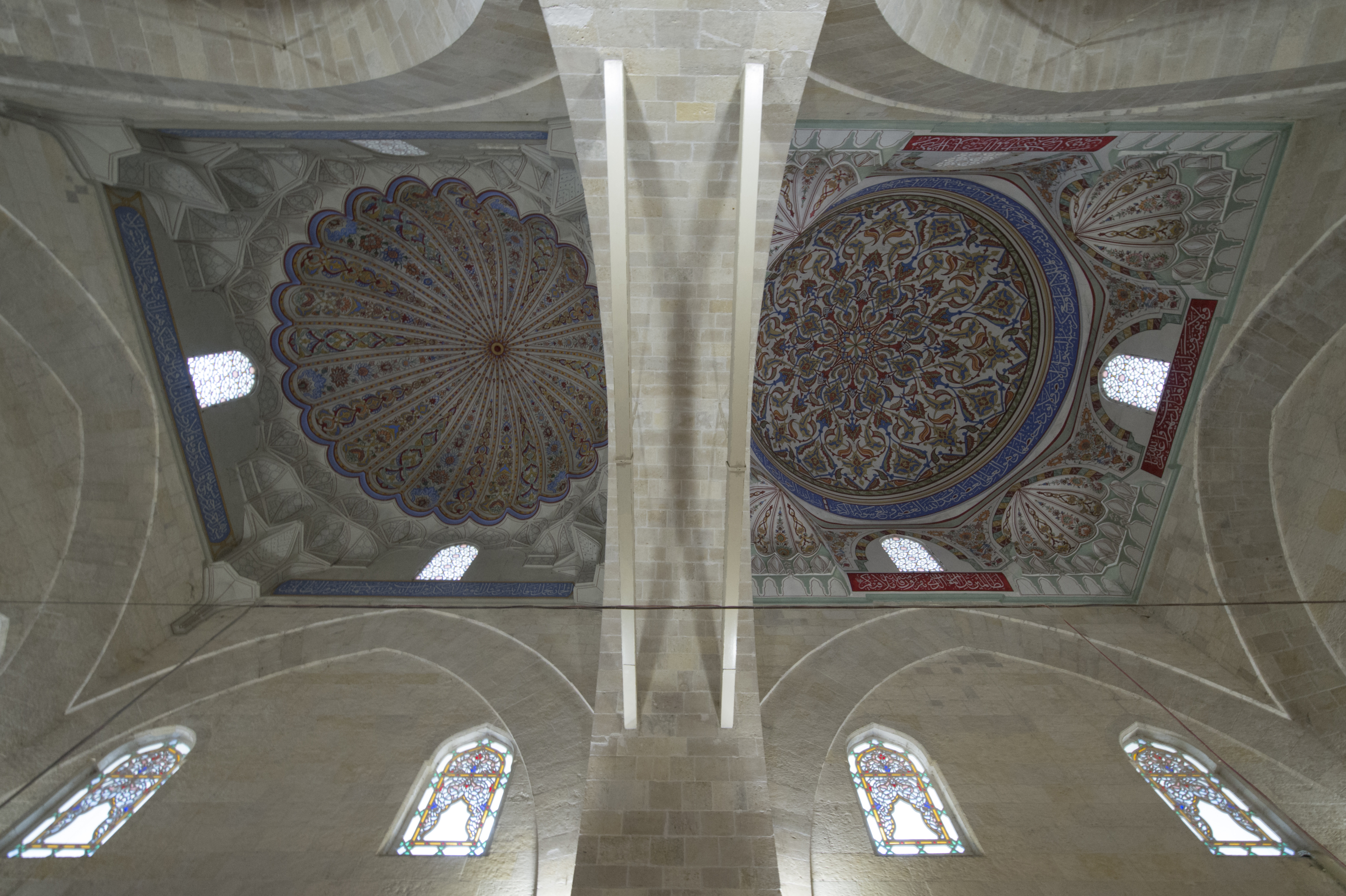
One of the two pairs of lateral domes

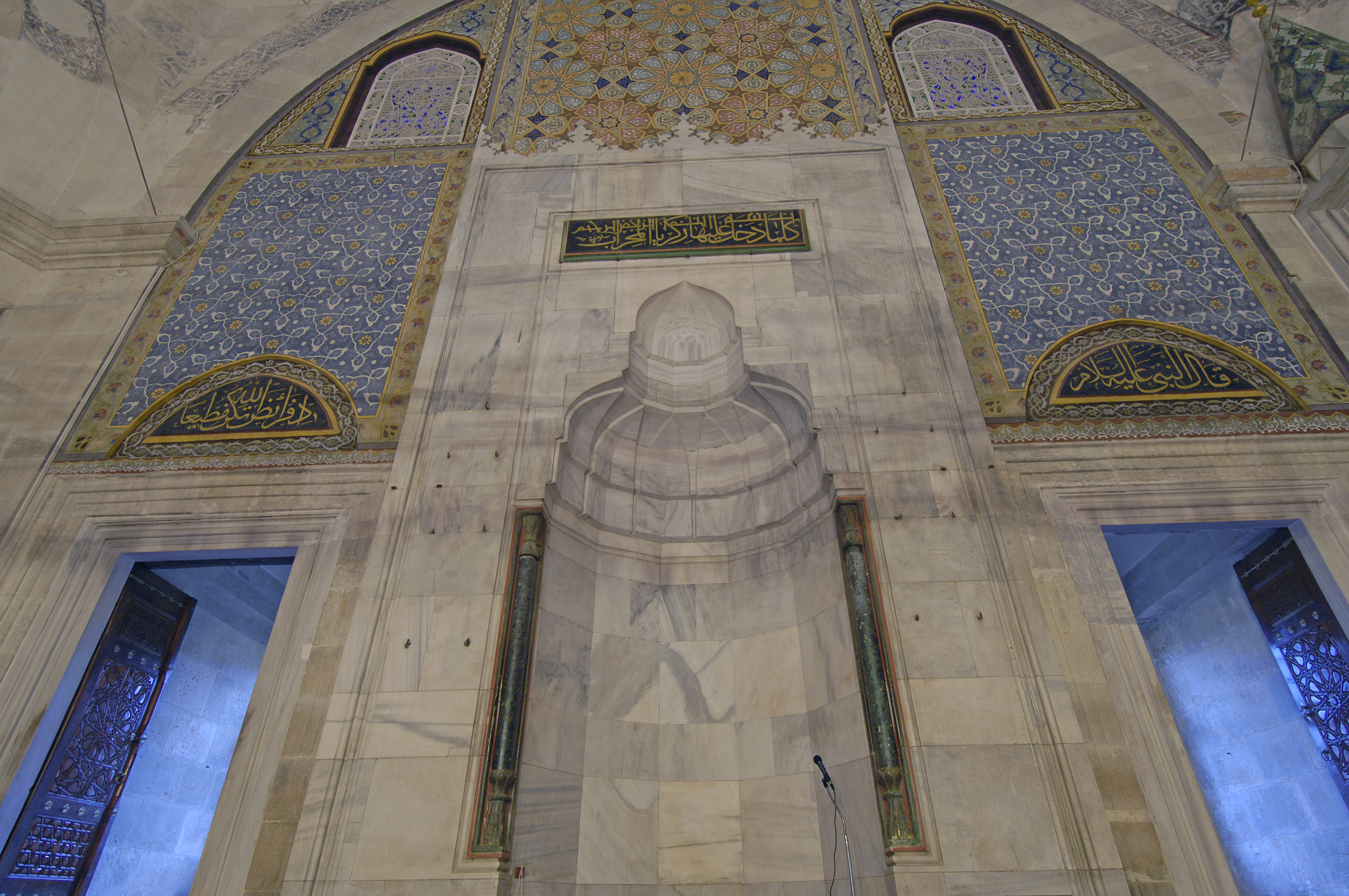
Detail of the mihrab

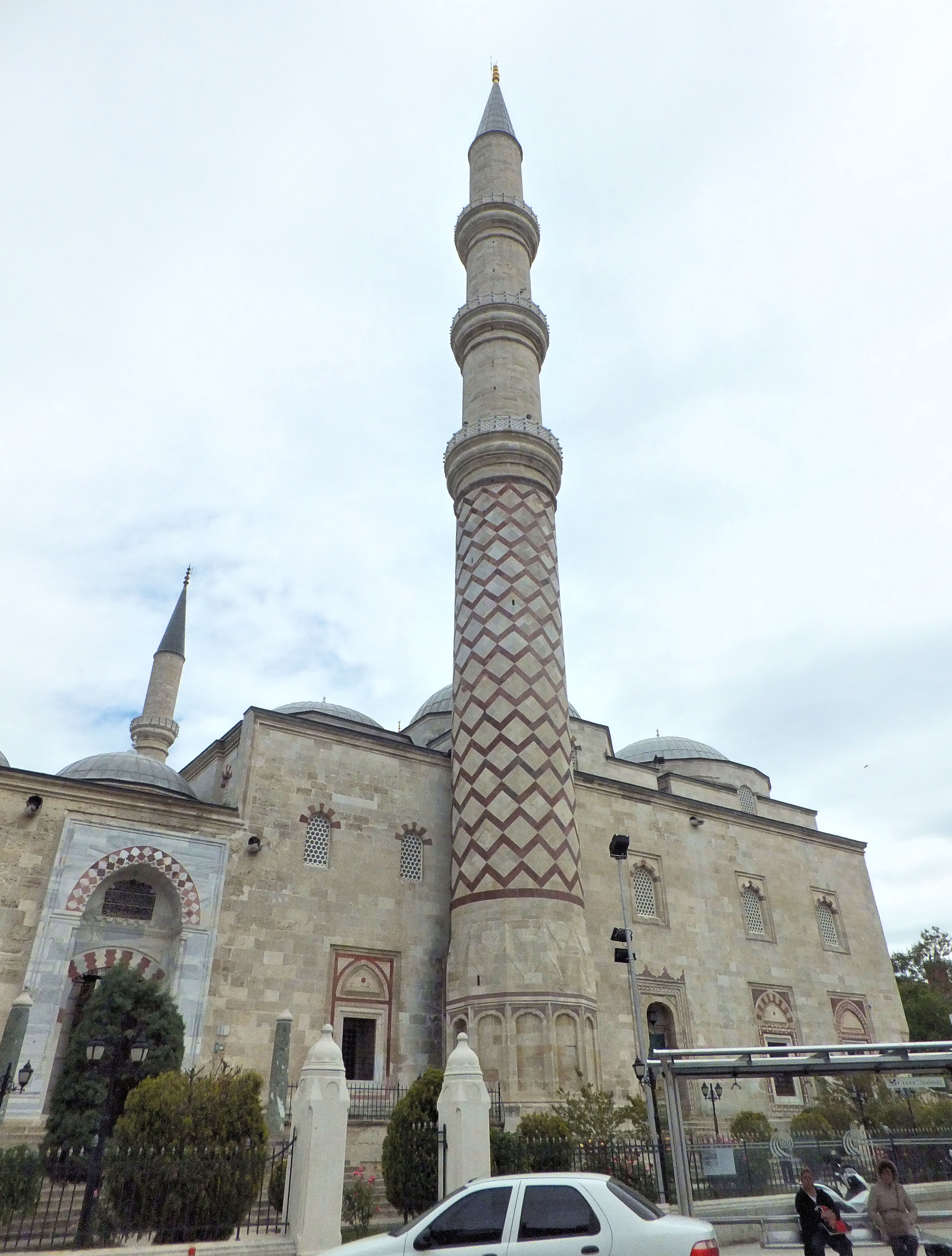
The southwestern minaret, featuring three balconies

=== Influences ===
The overall form of the Üç Şerefeli Mosque, with its central-dome prayer hall, arcaded court with fountain, minarets, and tall entrance portals, foreshadowed the features of later Ottoman mosque architecture. It has been described as a "crossroads of Ottoman architecture", marking the culmination of architectural experimentation with different spatial arrangements during the period of the Beyliks and the early Ottomans. Kuban describes it as the "last stage in Early Ottoman architecture", while the central dome plan and the "modular" character of its design signaled the direction of future Ottoman architecture in Istanbul.

Scholars have tried to suggest various possible sources of influence and inspiration for this design. Blair and Bloom suggest that it is a grander-scale version of the Saruhanid congregational mosque or Ulu Cami (1367) in Manisa, a city with which Murad II was familiar. Godfrey Goodwin suggests that all the elements needed for the design of the Üç Şerefeli Mosque were already present in the existing mosques of western Anatolia, such as the Ulu Cami of Manisa and the Isa Bey Mosque of Selçuk, but that they had simply not been united together in a single design. Kuban suggests that the mosque's spatial design evolved from the importance of the domed space commonly found in front of the mihrab in early Islamic architecture, as well as from the influence of earlier single-domed Ottoman mosques.

== See also ==
- Islamic architecture
- List of mosques
- Ottoman architecture

== Sources ==
- Blair, Sheila S.; Bloom, Jonathan M. (1995). The Art and Architecture of Islam 1250-1800. Yale University Press. ISBN 9780300064650.
- Carswell, John (2006) [1998]. Iznik Pottery. London: British Museum Press. ISBN 978-0-7141-2441-4.
- Goodwin, Godfrey (1971). A History of Ottoman Architecture. London: Thames and Hudson. ISBN 0-500-27429-0.
- Necipoğlu, Gülru (2011) [2005]. The Age of Sinan: Architectural Culture in the Ottoman Empire (Revised ed.). Reaktion Books. ISBN 9781861892539.
- Kuban, Doğan (2010). Ottoman Architecture. Translated by Mill, Adair. Antique Collectors' Club. ISBN 9781851496044.
- Reifstahl, Rudolf M. (1937). "Early Turkish tile revetments in Edirne". Ars Islamica. 4: 249–281. JSTOR 25167042.
