= Fazlallah Astarabadi =

Persian mystic

al-Ḥurūfī

Personal life
- Born: 1339 or 40 Astarabad (now known as Gorgan, Iran)
- Died: 1394 (aged 53-55) Nakhchivan
- Children: Amīr Nūrullāh, Salāmullāh, Kalīmullāh, Kalīmatullāh-ē 'Ulyā, 'Ā'išah, Fātimah, Bībī, Umm'ul-kitāb, Fātihat'ul-kitāb
- Main interest(s): Lettrism, Hermeticism
- Notable work(s): Jāwidānnāmah-i Kabir, Maḥabbatnāmah, Nawnnāmah

Religious life
- Religion: Islam
- Jurisprudence: Šāfiʿī (formerly)
- Movement: Hurufism

Fażlu l-Lāh Astar-Ābādī (Persian: فضل‌الله استرآبادی, 1339/40 in Astarābād – 1394 in Nakhchivan), also known as Fażlullāh Tabrīzī Astarābādī by a pseudonym al-Ḥurūfī and a pen name Nāimī, was a Persian mystic who founded the Ḥurūfī movement.

The basic belief of the Ḥurūfiyyah is that the God is reflected in the signs of Letters, which is ultimately derived from the Hermetic doctrines introduced into Shi'ism by Haydar Amuli, like the Microcosm–macrocosm analogy. His followers first came from the village of Toqchi near Isfahan and from there, the fame of his small community spread throughout Khorasan, Iraq, Azerbaijan and Shirvan. The center of Fażlullāh Nāimī's influence was Baku and most of his followers came from Shirvan. Among his followers was the famous Ḥurūfī poet Seyyed Imadaddin Nasimi, one of the greatest Turkic mystical poets of the late 14th and early 15th centuries.

== Early life ==
Fażlullāh was born in Astarābād, Iran, circa 1339/1340, to a family of judges. According to the traditional Ḥurūfī biography, Fażlullāh Astarābādī was born in a household that traced its descent to the seventh Shī‘ah Imam, Musa al-Kazim. Fażlullāh's predecessor, in eighth or ninth generation, was Muhammad al-Yamanī, from the family which originated in Yemen, the center of heterodox Islam at the time. Fażlullāh's family was from the Shāfi‘ī school of Sunni Islam — however, this did not figure greatly in his religious development.

When his father died when he was still a child, Fażlullāh inherited his position and appeared at the courthouse on horse back everyday, acting as a figurehead while his assistants carried out the work of the court. At the age of eighteen he had an extraordinary religious experience when a nomadic dervish recited a verse by Jalal ad-Din Muhammad Rumi:

Why are you afraid of death when you have the essence of eternity?
How can the grave contain you when you have the light of God?

Fażlullāh fell into a trance and when he inquired as to the verses meaning, his religious teacher told him that to understand it one would have to devote their life to religious pursuits and then one could experience the meaning rather than knowing it intellectually. After a year of trying to maintain his duties as a judge during the day while engaged in solitary prayer in a graveyard at night, he abandoned his family, possessions and security to become an itinerant religious seeker. As he left Astarābād, he exchanged his clothes for the felt clothing of a shepherd he met. From then on he always wore this shirt as a symbol of having abandoned worldly connections and comforts.

== Works ==
Fażlullāh composed his works in Standard Persian as well as the Persian dialect of Astarābād. His most significant work which establishes the foundation of Ḥurūfism is titled Javidan-namah "Eternal Book". Two recensions were made of the Javidan-namah. The one which is designated as Kabīr "Great" is in the Astarābādī Persian dialect and the one that is entitled Ṣaghīr "Small" is in standard Persian. Another book in the Astarābādī Persian dialect is the Nawm-namah, giving an account of the dreams of Fażlullāh at various times in his life. A prose work, entitled Mahabbat-namah in the Astarābād Persian dialect was imitated by Turkish Ḥurūfīs. He also composed a book of poetry in standard Persian and gave it the title Arsh-namah. In addition to this book, he also composed another small collection of poetry in standard Persian using the pen name Nāimī. From his poetic works, it is evident that he knew Arabic, Persian and his native language, the Gorgani language. He was well-versed in Persian literature, and that he was capable of composing poetry in the classical style.

== Sahib-i ta'vil: the Master of Esoteric Interpretation ==
According to Encyclopedia of Islam, one of the key tenets of Ḥurūfism is that God reveals himself in the Word and that words are composed of sounds that are associated with letters (ḥurūf). The total number of letters (and their numerical value according to the abjad) is the total of all emanating and creating possibilities of God and is God himself made manifest.

=== Dreams of Fażlullāh ===
Fażlullāh made his way to Isfahan in central Iran. Unused to walking, he suffered a leg injury by the time he arrived. Here he found a variety of religious seekers many of whom shunned contacts with wider society and often flouted religious convention. However, Fażlullāh never joined any of these groups. He began to experience a series of dreams which he came to regard as prophetic. He then made Hajj (pilgrimage) to Mecca before moving to Kunya Urgench, the capital of Khwarazm. He decided to make another Hajj, but only got as far as Luristan when he had a dream in which a man told him to go to Mashhad. Concluding the man was ‘Alī ar-Riḍā (d. 818) — who is buried in Mashhad — he made a detour to ar-Riḍā's shrine before completing a second Hajj and returning to Urgench. Here he practiced sufi religious practices and continued to have a number of dreams. In one Jesus told him that four sufis — Ibrahim Bin Adham, Bayazid Bistami, Al-Tustari and Bahlul — were the most sincere religious seekers in the history of Islam. In another, Muhammad appeared to him explaining to an old man that dream interpretation was very hard as the surface identities of characters in dreams were stand-ins for others and that dreams involved far deeper meanings than their apparent concern. Then Muhammad turned to Fażlullāh and said that true dream interpretation was like a rare star that becomes visible every 30,000 years and encompasses seven thousand worlds. He told Fażlullāh that he could see it if he stood under an orange tree, This Fażlullāh did and saw seven stars one of which was bigger than the rest. And the luminous star emitted a ray of light which entered his right eye conveying a special intuitive knowledge to him. This felt like a pearly light which enabled him to understand the hadith. After this dream Fażlullāh claimed he could understand dreams and the language of birds. His followers called him sahib-i ta'vil — the master of esoteric interpretation following this. He rapidly attracted a crowd of people seeking explanations of dreams drawn from all walks of life. However, he preferred the company of religious aescetics and eventually decided to leave Urgench.

== Amongst the Sarbadars ==
Fażlullāh then moved to the region of Sabzavar in North east Iran, where a significant proportion of the local population were involved in apocalyptical religion. From 1337 to 1381 this region was under the rule of a diverse collection of noble families who did not follow a dynastic principle, with many people affiliated to a religious group known as the Sarbadars. There is some evidence that he was here in 1360 and that he made the prediction that ‘Alī Mu'ayyad would expel the Sarbadars, but that the latter would return within a year. Fifteen years later darwīsh Ruknu d-Dīn was expelled, only to return in triumph within the year. There are a number of stories relating to Fazlallah in this region, but he was to leave in 1365 traveling first to Yazd and then to Isfahan.

== Sojourn in Isfahan ==
Fażlullāh made himself at home in a mosque in the suburb of Tuqchi where he attracted two kinds of visitors: firstly, religious seekers seeking a guide and secondly those who wanted him to interpret dreams for more worldly reasons. Fażlullāh would accept no money for his interpretations and led an ascetic life, going without sleep spending the night in prayer and weeping continually to control his carnal desires. The Sufi Mu'in al-Din Shahrastani visited him and asked him about his understanding of a true man of God. He replied quoting Junayd Baghdadi that it is someone who is silent on the outside so that his inner reality can speak through him. Shahrastani became one of his prominent followers alongside men like Nasrallah Nafaji whose Khwab-namah "Book of Dreams" became one of the main biographical sources about Fażlullāh's life. These followers formed a tight-knit community around him, sharing a hermit-like lifestyle and a deep brotherly love that led them to think of themselves as sharing the same soul. These sincere followers claimed the received Karamat, spiritual gifts like special knowledge about sacred texts like the Bible and the Qur'an, an understanding of hidden matters and clear interpretations of the sayings and deeds of Muhammad and his immediate entourage. Meanwhile, a steady stream of the social elite, such as scholars, ministers, military and administrative officers as well as all kinds of wealthy people would ask his advice. Giving advice to such people as Mawlana Zayn ad-Dīn Rajayī and the Amir Farrukh Gunbadi, Fażlullāh's reputation spread throughout the provinces of Khurasan, Azerbaijan and Shirvan. Eventually he decided to move to Tabriz.

== Imprisonment and execution ==
For his spread of Hurūfism, circa 1394/1395, Fażlullāh Nā'imī was captured and imprisoned in Alinja, near Nakhchivan. He was subsequently sentenced for his heresies by the religious leaders and executed at the orders of Miran Shah, the son of Tamerlane.

His shrine is at Alinja.

== See also ==
- Mahdi
- Isma'ili
- Sufism
- Nasīmee
- Hurufiyya
- Shi'a Islam
- Hermeticism
- Nuktawiyya
- Murād Mīrzā
- Nuqta-yi Ula (Báb)
- Mahmoud Pasikhani
- Ahmed Lur
- List of extinct Shia sects
