= 'Ilm al-huruf =

Arabic numerological process

ʿIlm al-Ḥurūf (Arabic: عِلْم الْحُرُوف) or the science of letters, also called Islamic letterism, is a process of Arabic numerology whereby numerical values assigned to Arabic letters are added up to provide total values for words in the Quran, similar to Hebrew gematria. Used to infer meanings and reveal secret or hidden messages.

ʿIlm al-Ḥurūf is composed of the two words ʿilm (Arabic: عِلْم) meaning "knowledge", and ḥurūf (Arabic: حُرُوف), the plural of the word ḥarf (Arabic: حَرْف), meaning "letters".

== Table of letter values ==
Arabic alphabet	name	numerological value
ا	ʼalif	1
ب	bāʼ	2
ج	jīm	3
د	dāl	4
ه	hāʼ	5
و	wāw	6
ز	zāy	7
ح	ḥāʼ	8
ط	ṭāʼ	9
ي	yāʼ	10
ك	kāf	20
ل	lām	30
م	mīm	40
ن	nūn	50
س	sīn	60
ع	ʿayn	70
ف	fāʼ	80
ص	ṣād	90
ق	q̈āf	100
ر	rāʼ	200
ش	šīn	300
ت	tāʼ	400
ث	thāʼ	500
خ	khāʼ	600
ذ	ḏāl	700
ض	ḍād	800
ظ	ẓāʼ	900
غ	ġayn	1000

== See also ==
- Eastern Arabic numerals – Numerals used in the eastern Arab world and Asia
- Gematria – Numerological practice of reading a word or phrase as a number
- Hurufism – Iranian Sufi mystic order in Islam
- Hurufiyya movement – Art movement drawing upon Islamic calligraphy
- Western Arabic numerals – Symbols 0, 1, 2, 3, 4, 5, 6, 7, 8, and 9

== Bibliography ==
- Bahr al-Karai'b, Tayyeb Zohair, Heravi Mohammad (Thiqatul islam), Islamic Turath, 2024, ISBN 9786226946179.
- Fahd, T. (1971). "Ḥurūf". In Lewis, B.; Ménage, V. L.; Pellat, Ch. & Schacht, J. (eds.). The Encyclopaedia of Islam, Second Edition. Volume III: H–Iram. Leiden: E. J. Brill. doi:10.1163/1573-3912_islam_SIM_2971. OCLC 495469525.
- Gilis, Charles André (1993). Les sept étendards du califat (in French). Paris: Éditions Al-bouraq. ISBN 2713801419. OCLC 33895971.
- Guénon, René (1962). Les Symboles de la Science Sacrée (in French). Paris: Éditions Gallimard. OCLC 1132121884 – via classiques.uqam.ca.
- Hamès, Constant (2007). Coran et talismans : textes et pratiques magiques en milieu musulman, Hommes et sociétés (in French). Karthala. ISBN 978-2845868731. OCLC 159955184.
- Ibn Arabi (1997). "La Science des lettres". Les Illuminations de La Mecque (in French). Translated by Gril, Denis. Paris: Éditions Albin Michel.
- Lory, Pierre; Regourd, Annick, eds. (1993). Sciences occultes et Islam (in English and French). Institut français de Damas. ISBN 2901315046. OCLC 1006217995.
- Vâlsan, Michel (1984). L'Islam et la fonction de René Guénon (in French). Paris: Éditions de l'Œuvre. ISBN 2904011056. OCLC 14564314.
