= Hurufism =

Iranian Sufi mystic order in Islam

Hurufism (Arabic: حُرُوفِيَّة ḥurūfiyyah, Persian: حُروفیان horūfiyān) is a form of Islamic numerology based on the mysticism of letters (ḥurūf), essentially being the Islamic equivalent of gematria. It originated in the Sufi circles of Astrabad and spread to areas of western Iran (Persia), Anatolia, and the Balkans in the late 14th and early 15th centuries.

== Foundation ==
The founder and spiritual head of the Hurufi movement was Fazlallah Astarabadi (1340–94). Born in Astrabad (now Gorgan, Iran), he was strongly drawn to Sufism and the teachings of Mansur al-Hallaj and Rumi at an early age. In the mid-1370s, Fazlallah started to propagate his teachings all over Iran and Azerbaijan. While living in Tabriz, Fazlallah gained an elite following in the court of the Jalairid Sultanate. At that time, Fazlallah was still in the mainstream of Sufi tradition. Later, he did move towards more esoteric spirituality, and, failing to convert Timur, was executed in 1394 near Alinja Tower in Nakhchivan by the ruler's son, Miran Shah. The large uprising of Hurufis was crushed, but the popular movement survived for another decade or so in different guises.

Fazlallah's greatest work was the Jāvdānnāme-ye Kabir ("Great Book of Eternity"), likely written in Baku before his arrest, which survived due to its dissemination due to copies made by his daughter Makhdumzāde. It was largely preserved in popular culture due to its use by dervishes of the Bektashi Order.

== Key elements ==
According to Fazlallah, the key to open the seventh sealed book, the Qurʾan, is a kabbalistic system of letters that is expounded by later Hurufis in the Hidayat Namah, Jawidan and in the Mahram Namah. The Universe is eternal and moves by rotation. Divine countenance is imperishable and is manifest in Man, the best of forms, zuhur kibriya. God is incarnated in every atom. Hurufis considered Fazlallah Astarabadi a manifestation of God's force after Adam, Moses and Muhammad. God is also embodied in words and the 28 letters of the Arabic alphabet, and the 32 letters of the Persian alphabet are the basis for love and beauty in the world. Seven is a key number corresponding to noble parts of the face, the verses of Al-Fatiha and verbal confession of faith. Man is a supreme copy of the divine and the key to haqiqa.

According to R. N. Frye's The Cambridge History of Iran, Hurufism was an expression of Isma'ilism in its mystical identification of the human figure but differed in its recognition of haqiqa in the substance of letters rather than in the person of the Imam.

== Impact ==
After Fazlallah's death his ideas were further developed and propagated by Imadaddin Nasimi and "certain accursed ones of no significance" in Azerbaijan and Seyid Ishag in Turkey. The poet Imadaddin Nasimi (?–1417) and other Hurufis made kabbalistic tendencies subordinate to mystic concepts of Sufism, and specifically those of Mansur Al-Hallaj, who was another great influence on Imadaddin Nasimi.

Through Nasimi's poetry Hurufi ideas influenced, to different degrees, people like Niyazi-i Misri, Fuzûlî, Habibi, Ismail I, and Rushani. The Bektashi Order, which is still active in Anatolia and the Balkans, was a repository for the Hurufi teachings and writings. One of Fazlallah's personal students, Rafî'î, emigrated into the Balkans. He transmitted a central thesis of Hurufism, that the cardinalities of the Arabic and Persian alphabet respectively enumerate all types of shape and sound, by axes of symmetry. A Hurufi rebellion in Kwarezem was suppressed by the Mongols, and that motivated the exodus of Hurufis to the Balkans. The Bektashi manuscripts show almost 500 years of Hurufism in the Balkans, with a peak in the 1700s. Other Sufi orders, such as the Qadiriyya and the Naqshbandi, contributed in the collection, retrieval, and translation of Hurufi manuscripts.

=== Hurufi manuscripts ===
From the Balkans, a great number of records were recorded in what is today Albania, but the relation between Bektashism and Hurufism is evidenced from Greek transcriptions. In total, many of the Hurufi manuscripts that are existent today were safeguarded in the libraries of Bektashi lodges, including Fadl’Allah Yazdânî’s Cāvidān-Nāma, Shaykh Sāfî’s Hākikāt-Nāma, Ali’ûl-A’lâ’s Māhşar-Nāma, Amîr Gıyâs’ad-Dîn’s İstivâ-Nāme, Frişte Oğlu’s Ahirat-Nāma, and some other books written on "Hurufi Theology" like Aşık-Nāma, Hidāyat-Nāma, Mukāddama’t-ûl-Hākayık, Muhārram-Nāma-i Sayyid İshāk, Nihāyat-Nāma, Tûrāb-Nāma, Miftāh’ûl-Gayb, Tuhfat’ûl-Uşşak, Risâla-i Noktā, Risāle-i Hurûf, Risāla-i Fāzl’ûl-Lah, and Risāla-i Virān Abdāl. Hurufi terms and concepts permeate Bektāshi poetry. Gül Baba provided an extensive compendium of Hurufi ideas in The Key to the Unseen.

== In contemporary culture ==
- The scenes of Fazlallah's execution and of Nasimi's brutal flailing in Aleppo appear in the Nasimi (1973) movie produced in Azerbaijan SSR.
- Hurufism plays a role in Turkish author Orhan Pamuk's novel The Black Book.
- Hurufism also plays a role in Ian McDonald's futuristic novel, The Dervish House.

== See also ==
- Abjad numerals
- Ahmed Lur
- Arabic alphabet
- Arabic numerals
- Báb
- Certain accursed ones of no significance, a phrase used by the Ottoman Sunni scholar Taşköprüzade to describe the Hurufis in their attempt to exert influence over Sultan Mehmed II
- Eastern Arabic numerals
- Ideas of reference and delusions of reference
- 'Ilm al-Huruf
- Isma'ilism
- Kabbalah, a Jewish movement finding secret meanings in Hebrew letters.
- List of extinct Shia sects
- Mahmoud Pasikhani
- Murād Mīrzā
- Nuqtavi
- One Dimension Group
