= Early Ottoman architecture =

Ottoman architecture in the 14th and 15th centuries

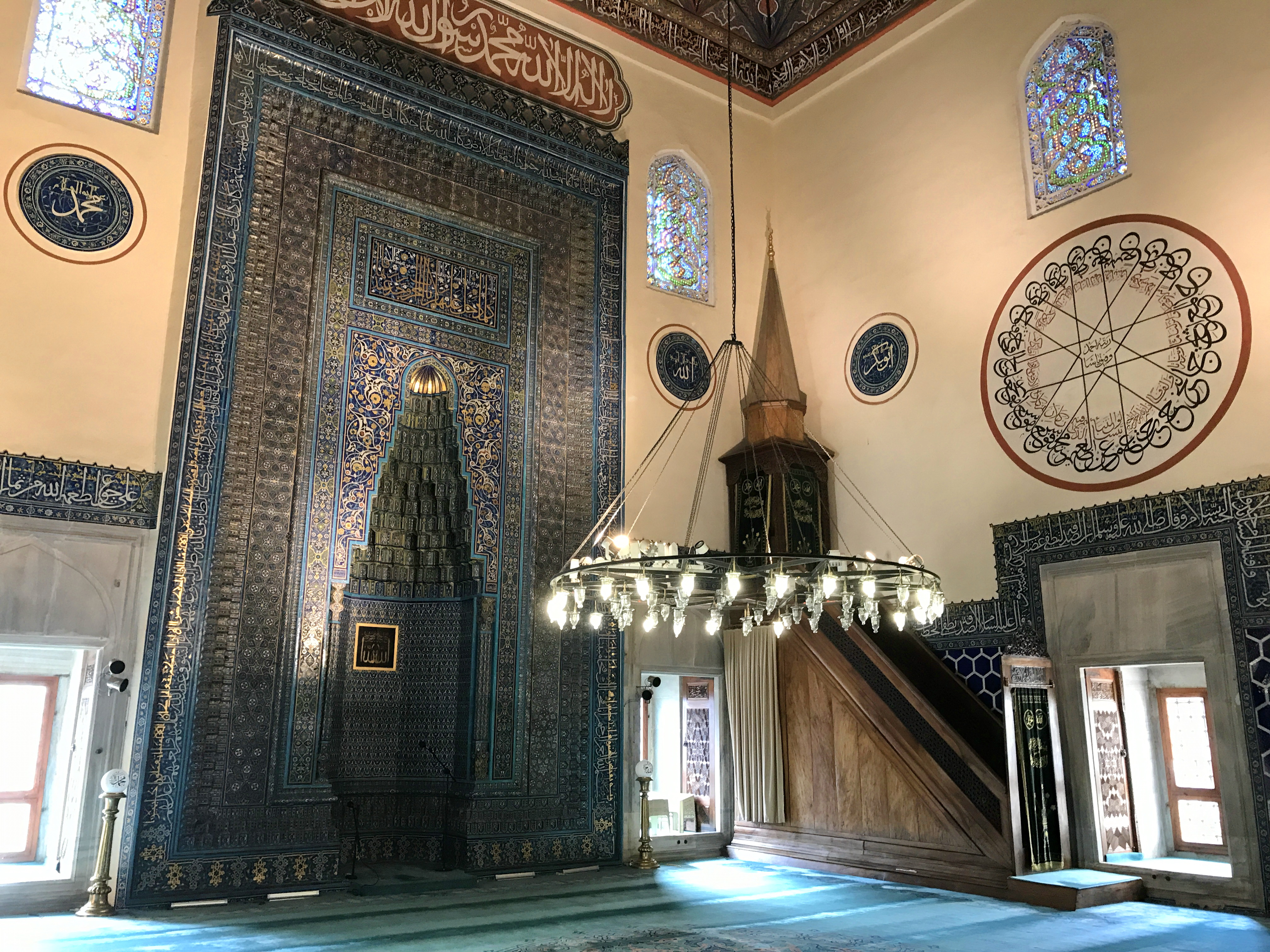
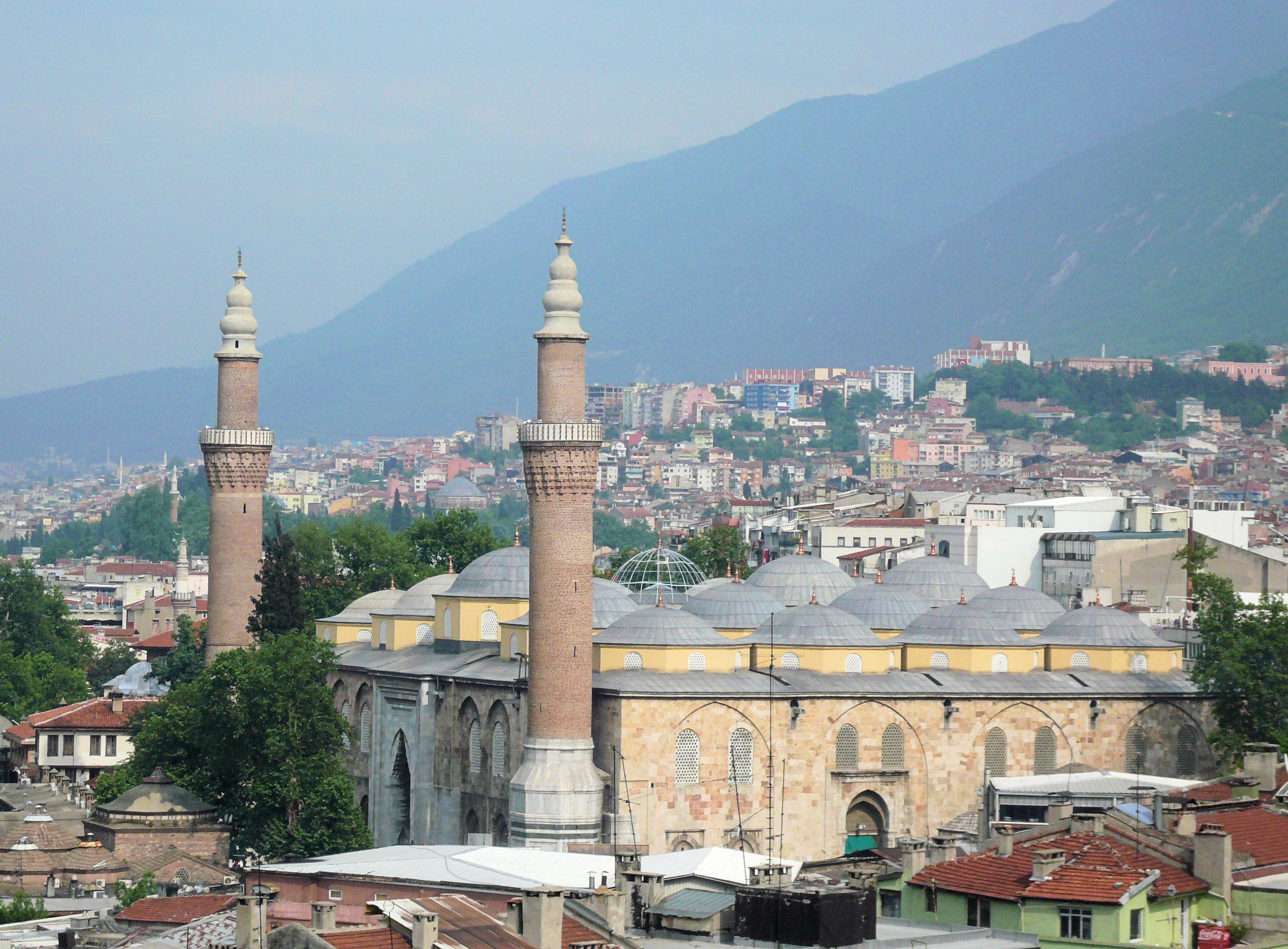
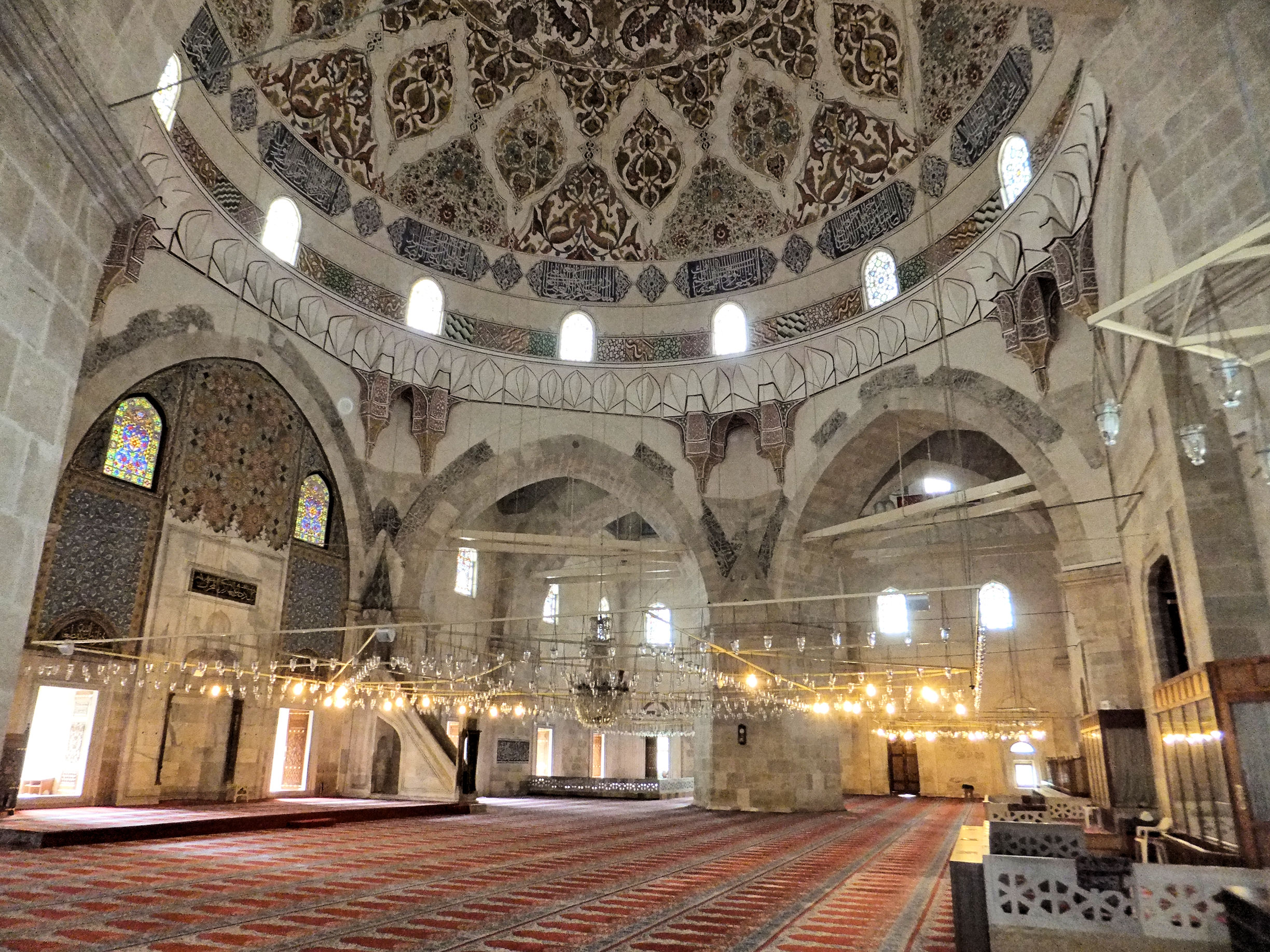
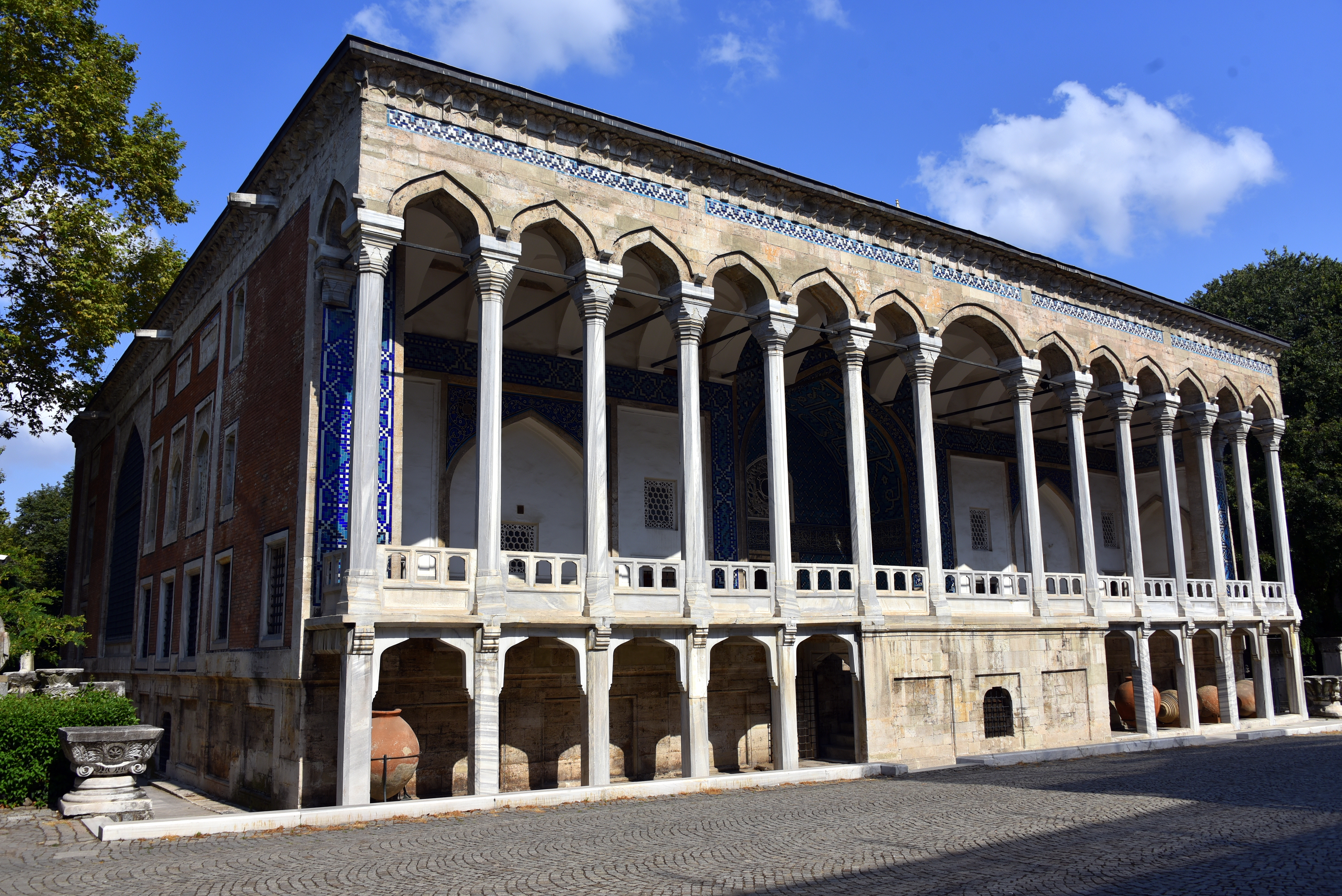
Clockwise from top left: Green Mosque in Bursa (1412–1424); Grand Mosque (Ulu Cami) of Bursa (c. 1400); Üç Şerefeli Mosque in Edirne (1437–1447); Tiled Kiosk (1472) at Topkapı Palace, Istanbul

Early Ottoman architecture developed through several stages during the 14th and 15th centuries, prior to the advent of what is generally considered "classical" Ottoman architecture in the 16th century. (Note: This article covers the history of Ottoman architecture up to the end of Bayezid II's reign (r. 1447–1512). This periodization is not strict or universal. Most references consulted in this article (e.g. Goodwin 1971 and Kuban 2010) do not necessarily state a sharp stylistic division between one period and the next, but rather describe a progressive evolution of forms and features over time. Some general references, such as Blair & Bloom (1995) and the Grove Encyclopedia of Islamic Art and Architecture, divide their discussion of this period between pre-1453 architecture and post-1453 architecture.) Ottoman architecture began as a continuation of earlier Seljuk and Beylik architecture while also incorporating local Byzantine influences. The new styles took shape in the capital cities of Bursa and Edirne as well as in other important early Ottoman cities such as Iznik.

Three main types of structures predominated in the early period: single-domed mosques (e.g. the Green Mosque in Iznik), "T-plan" buildings (e.g. the Green Mosque in Bursa), and multi-domed buildings (e.g. the Great Mosque of Bursa). Religious buildings were often part of larger charitable complexes (külliyes) that included other structures such as madrasas, hammams, tombs, and commercial establishments.

The Üç Şerefeli Mosque in Edirne, completed in 1447, features a wide arcaded courtyard leading to a prayer hall dominated by a huge central dome. Its design marked a major step in the evolution towards the form of later imperial mosques. After the conquest of Constantinople in 1453 by Mehmed II, the first Ottoman imperial mosque in the city was the Fatih Mosque completed in 1470. Its design demonstrated an increasing influence of the ancient Hagia Sophia on Ottoman architects while also setting a precedent for vast külliye complexes with a highly organized site plan. The Mosque of Bayezid II, completed in 1505 in the same city, is often considered the culmination of architectural developments of the 15th century and the final step leading to the classical style of the 16th century.

== Early developments (up to the reign of Mehmed I) ==
=== Background ===
The first Ottomans were established in northwest Anatolia near the borders of the Byzantine Empire. Their position at this frontier encouraged influences from Byzantine architecture and other ancient remains in the region, and there were examples of similar architectural experimentation by the other local dynasties of the region. The first Ottoman structures were built in Söğüt, the earliest Ottoman capital, and in nearby Bilecik, but they have not survived in their original form. They include a couple of small mosques and a mausoleum built in Ertuğrul's time (late 13th century). Bursa was captured in 1326 by the Ottoman leader Orhan. It served as the Ottoman capital until 1402, becoming a major center of patronage and construction. Orhan also captured İznik in 1331, turning it into another early center of Ottoman art.

The late 14th century and the early 15th century was furthermore a period of political and cultural interaction between the Ottoman state, the other Anatolian Beyliks, the Mamluk Sultanate, and the Timurid Empire. Some of the Anatolian dynasties employed Syrian architects in this period. In western Anatolia, the İsa Bey Mosque in Selçuk (1374–5) built for the Aydinids and the Grand Mosque of Manisa (1367) built for the Saruhanids were both designed by architects from Mamluk Syria and inspired by the layout of the Umayyad Mosque in Damascus (early 8th century). Ottoman and Anatolian architecture of this era thus absorbed architectural ideas from Timurid architecture, Mamluk architecture, and older Islamic monuments in these regions.

One of the early Ottoman stylistic distinctions that emerged was a tradition of designing more complete façades in front of mosques, especially in the form of a portico with arches and columns. Another early distinction was the reliance on domes. The main construction materials were brick and rubble masonry. The preference for bricks may have been influenced by Byzantine practice, while their relative lightness also made them well-suited for dome and vault constructions. It was also common for walls to be built with layers of brick alternating with layers of cut stone, a technique inherited from Byzantine architecture. Though there was no standard, a typical construction of this kind would employ three layers of bricks for one layer of cut stone.

In this early period there were generally three types of mosque or religious building: the single-domed mosque, the T-plan mosque or zaviye, and the multi-unit or multi-dome mosque. In early Ottoman society, the Sufi religious orders were the most important organisations that mobilized people and organized religious life; the Sunni ulama (religious scholars and jurists) only became leaders of religious life later, as the Ottoman state evolved. As a result, the most important type of religious building up until the first half of the 15th century (until the reign of Murad II) was the zaviye (from Arabic zawiya), a multi-functional religious structure that accommodated Sufi brotherhoods. While mosques in the strict sense were also built, the major foundations sponsored by early Ottoman sultans were zaviyes rather than mosques. Madrasas (Turkish: medrese), which catered to the ulama, were likewise less important and less numerous until later periods. Many of the early zaviyes were later converted into formal mosques during the 14th and 15th centuries, a conversion which was expressed architecturally by the addition of minarets (sometimes of crude appearance).

=== Single-domed mosques ===
The Hacı Özbek Mosque (1333) in İznik is the oldest Ottoman mosque with an inscription that documents its construction. It is also the first example of an Ottoman single-domed mosque, consisting of a square chamber covered by a dome. It is built in alternating layers of brick and cut stone, similar to Byzantine examples. The dome is covered in terracotta tiles, which was also a custom of early Ottoman architecture before later Ottoman domes were covered in lead. Other structures from the time of Orhan were built at İznik, Bilecik, and in Bursa.

Single-domed mosques continued to be built after this, such as the example of the Green Mosque in Iznik (1378–1391), which was built by an Ottoman pasha. The Green Mosque of İznik is the first Ottoman mosque for which the name of the architect (Hacı bin Musa) is known. It is notable for its careful exterior design and decoration (although this was damaged in the 20th-century Greco-Turkish War), as well as for the antechamber preceding the large domed chamber. The main dome covers a square space, and as a result the transition between the round base of the dome and the square chamber below is achieved through a series of triangular carvings known as "Turkish triangles", a type of pendentive which was common in Anatolian Seljuk and early Ottoman architecture.

An example of a single-domed mosque with a much larger dome can be found in the Yildirim Bayezid I Mosque in Mudurnu, which dates from around 1389. The ambitious dome, with a diameter of 20 meters, was comparable to much later Ottoman mosques but it had to be built closer to the ground in order to be stable. Instead of Turkish triangles the transition is made through squinches that start low along the walls.

Single-domed mosques

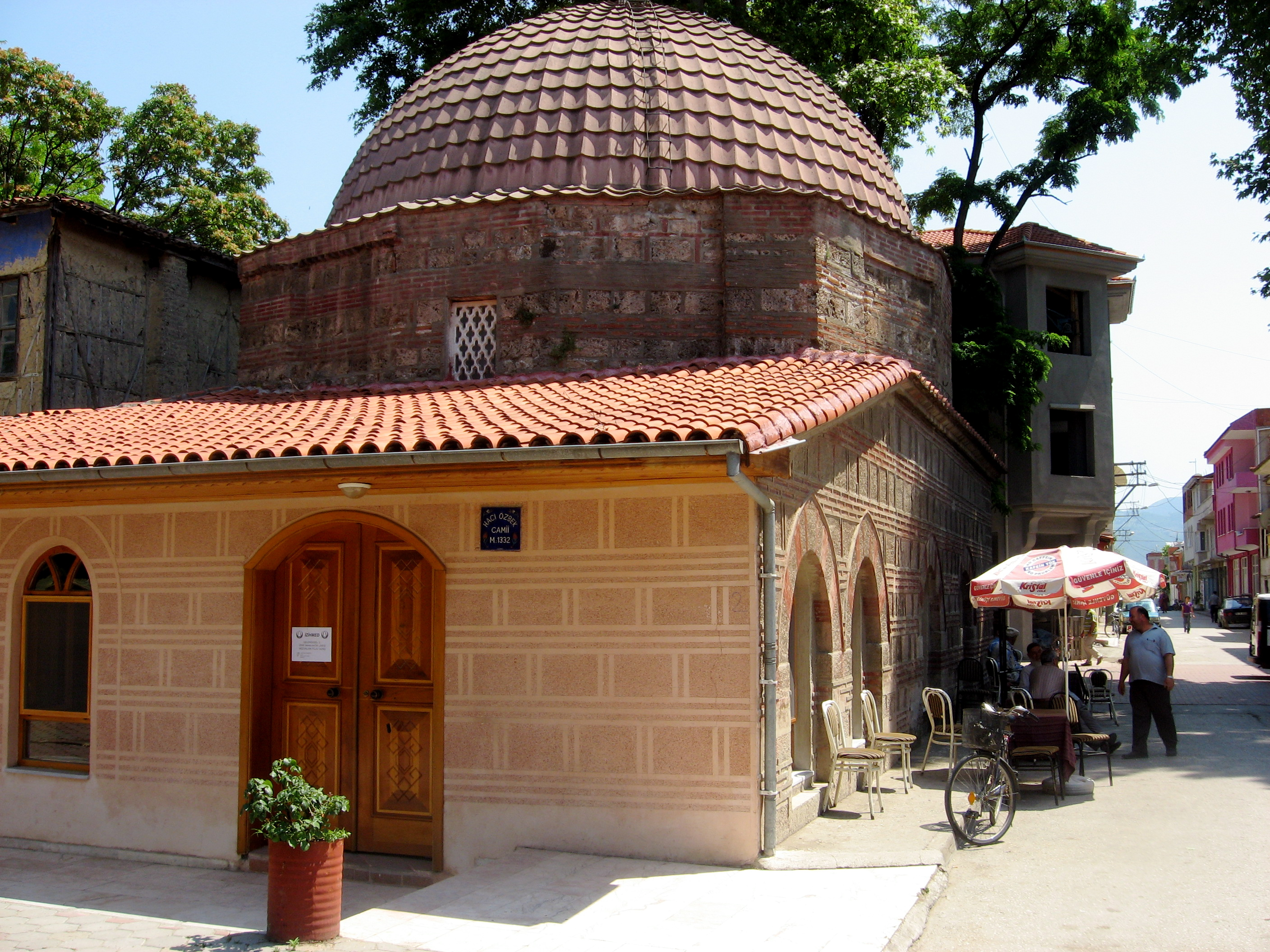
Hacı Özbek Mosque in Iznik (1333)

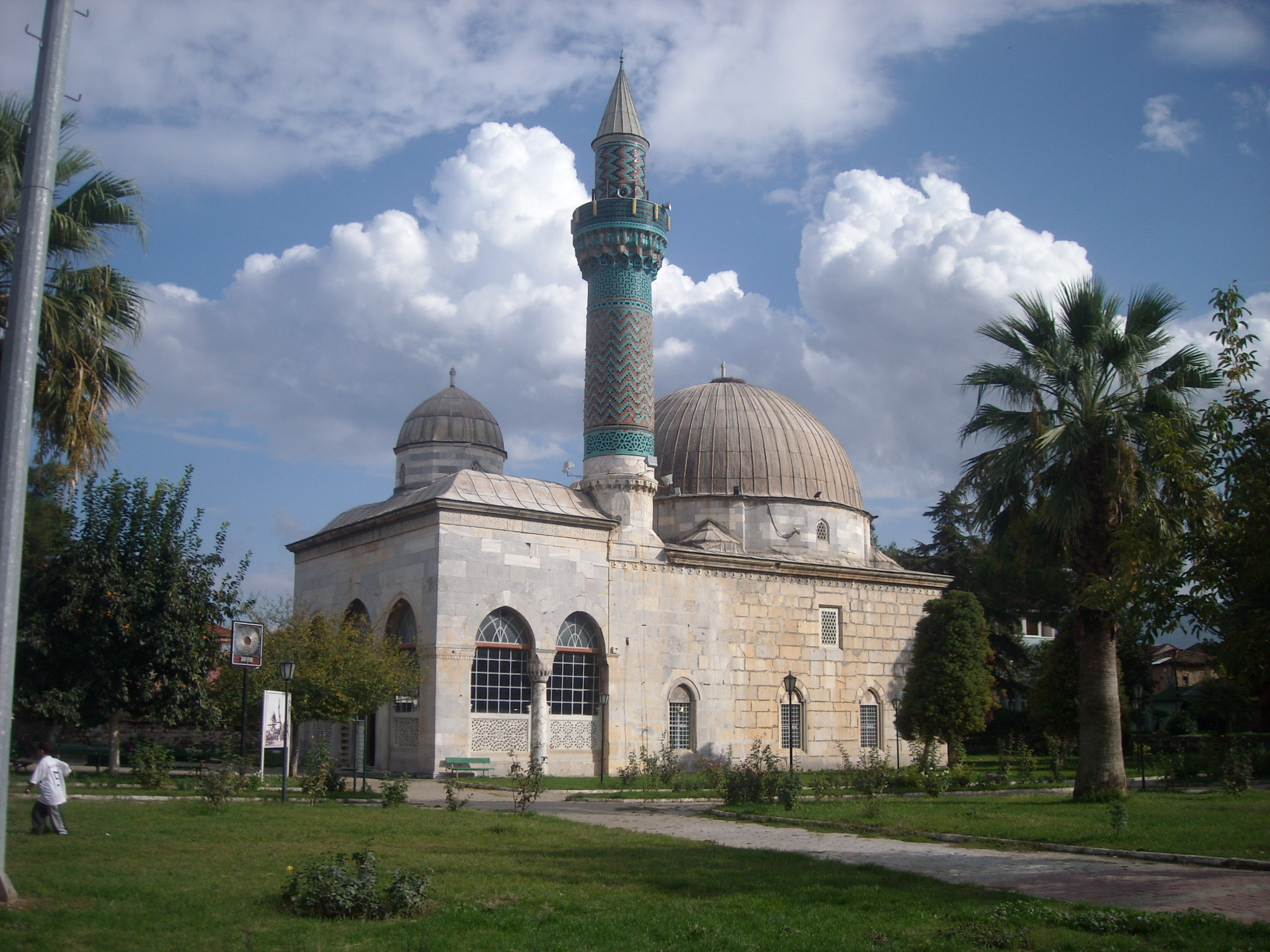
Green Mosque in Iznik (1378–1391)

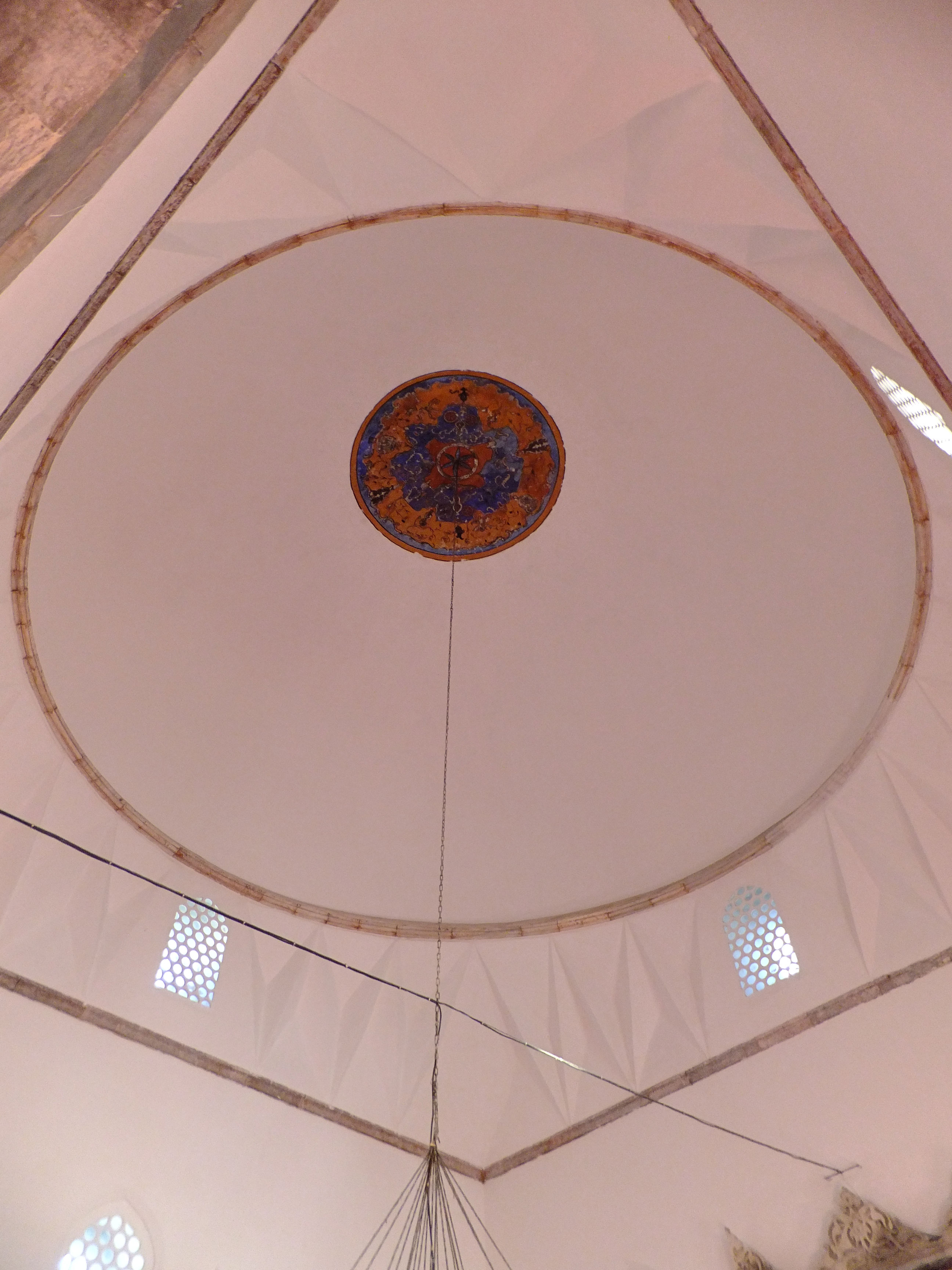
Green Mosque interior: "Turkish triangles" form the transition from dome to square chamber

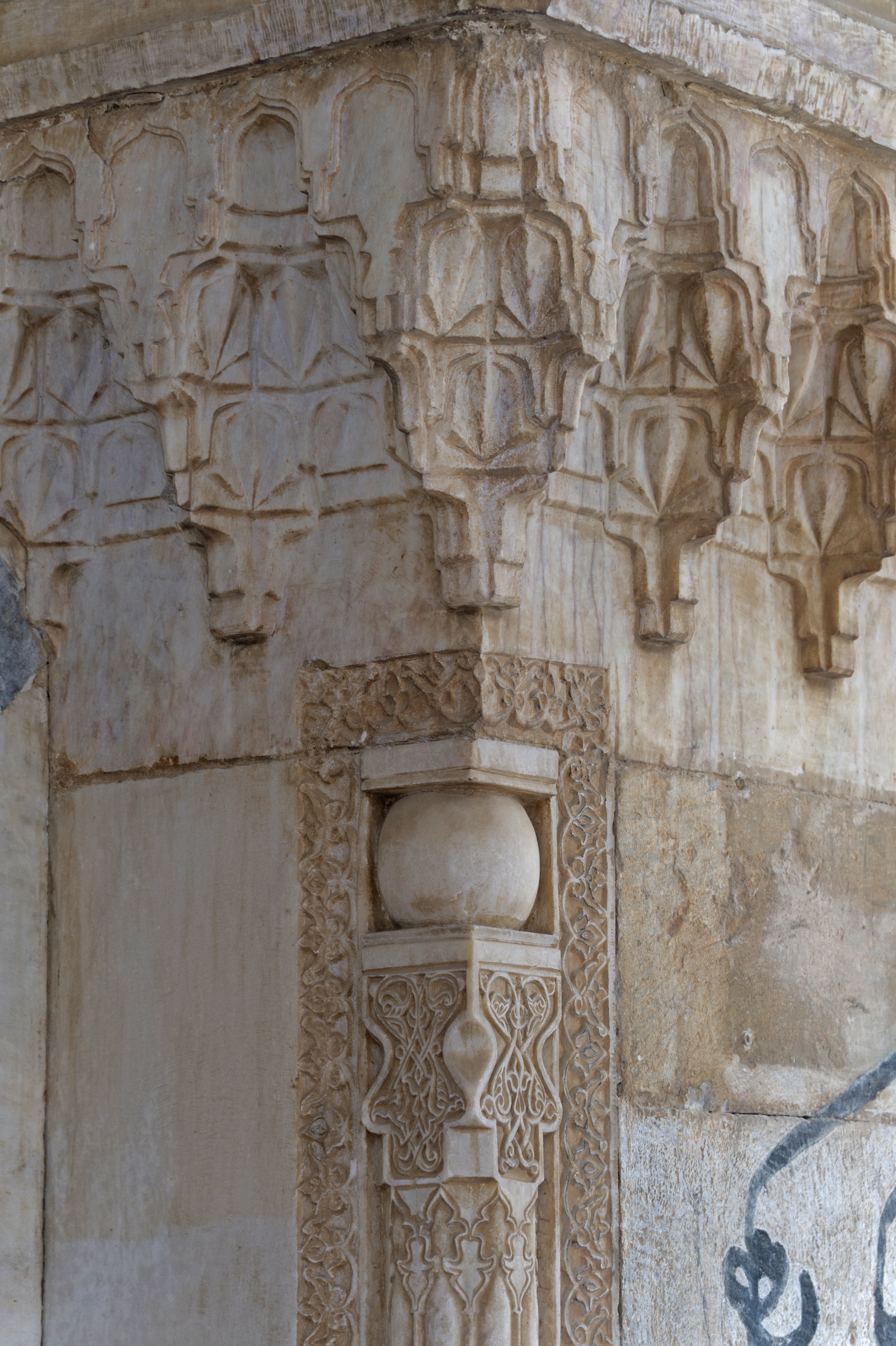
Details of Green Mosque, including stone-carved muqarnas

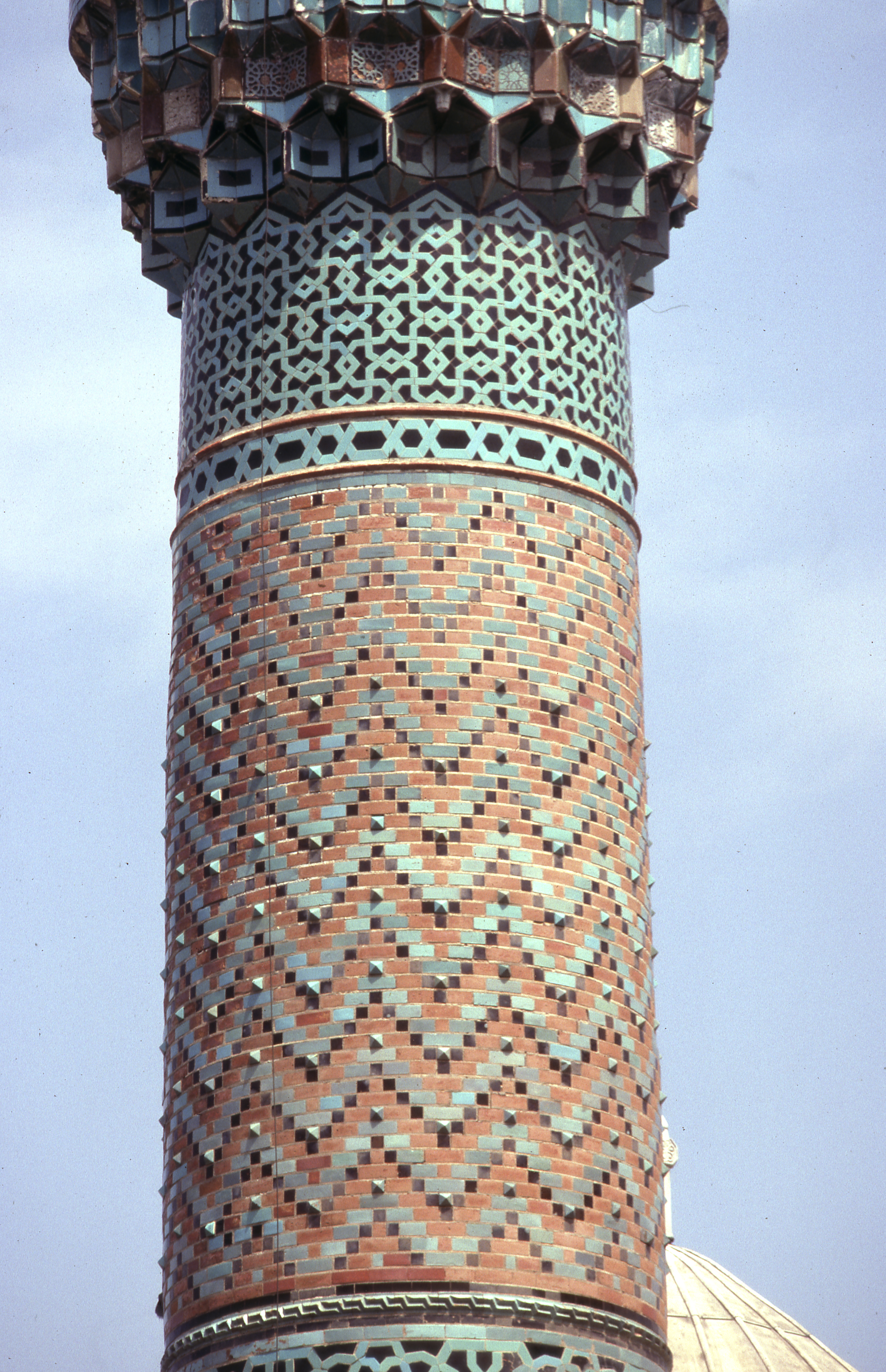
Details of Green Mosque minaret

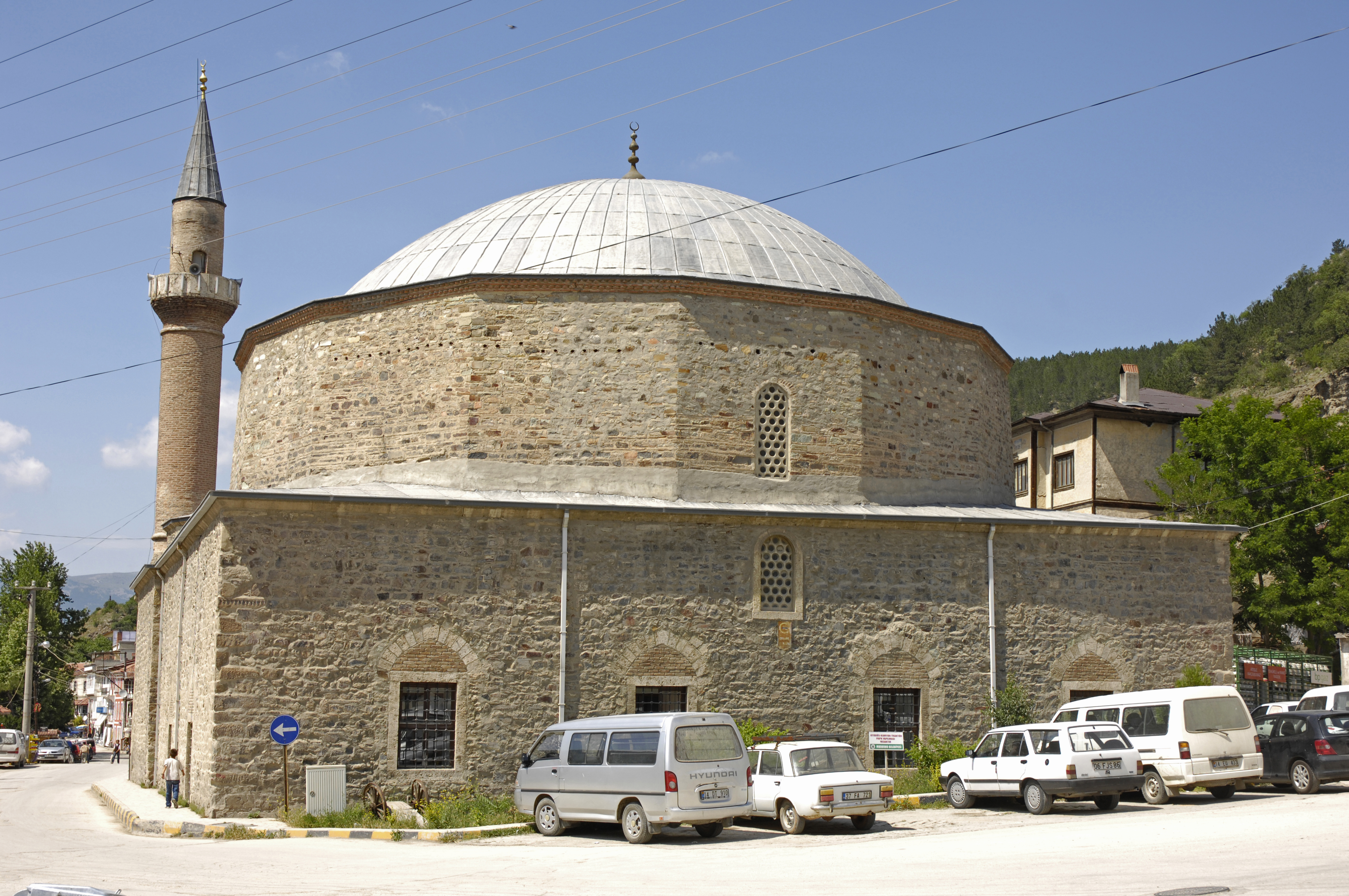
Yildirim Bayezid Mosque in Mudurnu (circa 1389)

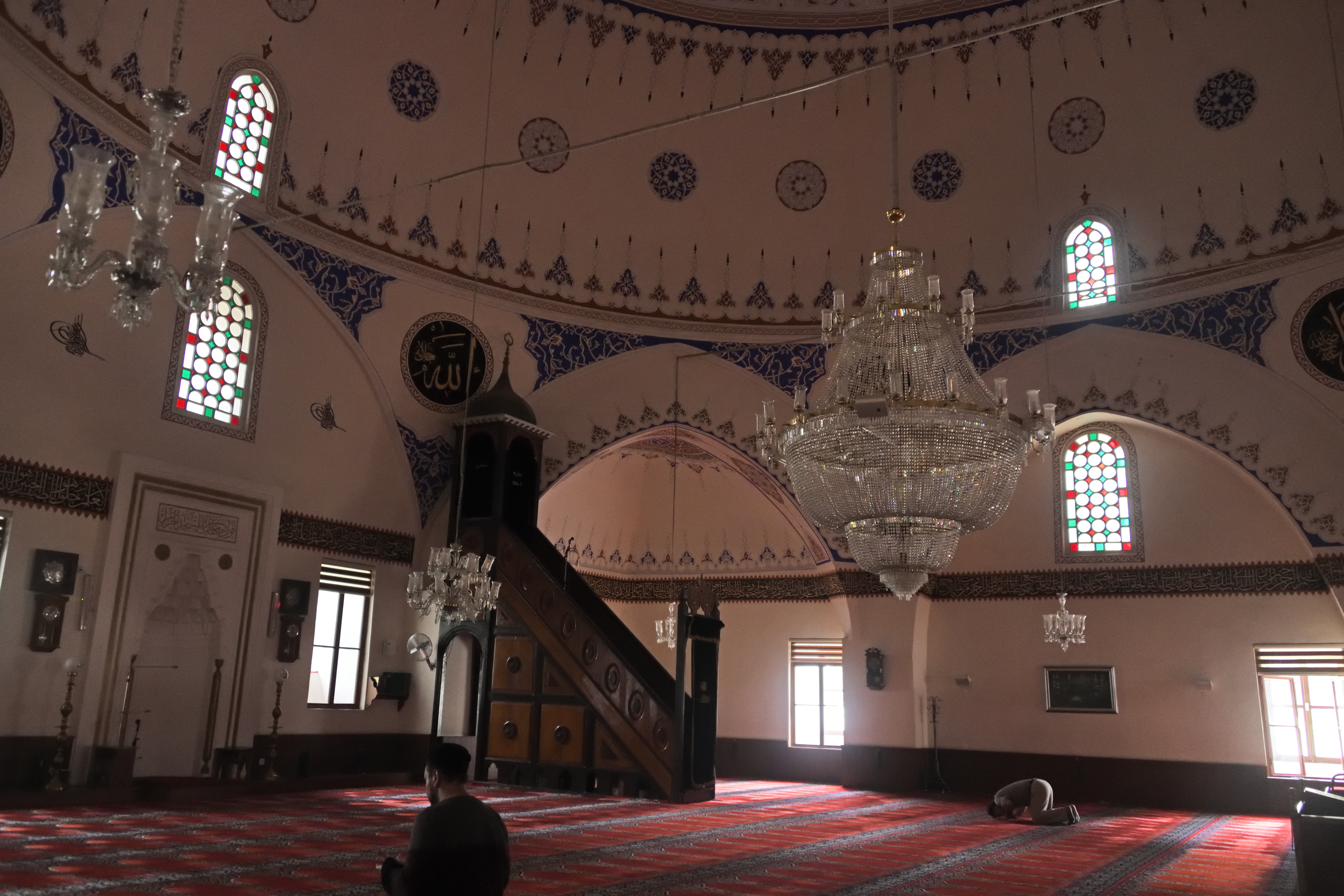
Interior of Yildirim Bayezid Mosque in Mudurnu

=== "T-plan" mosques and zaviyes ===
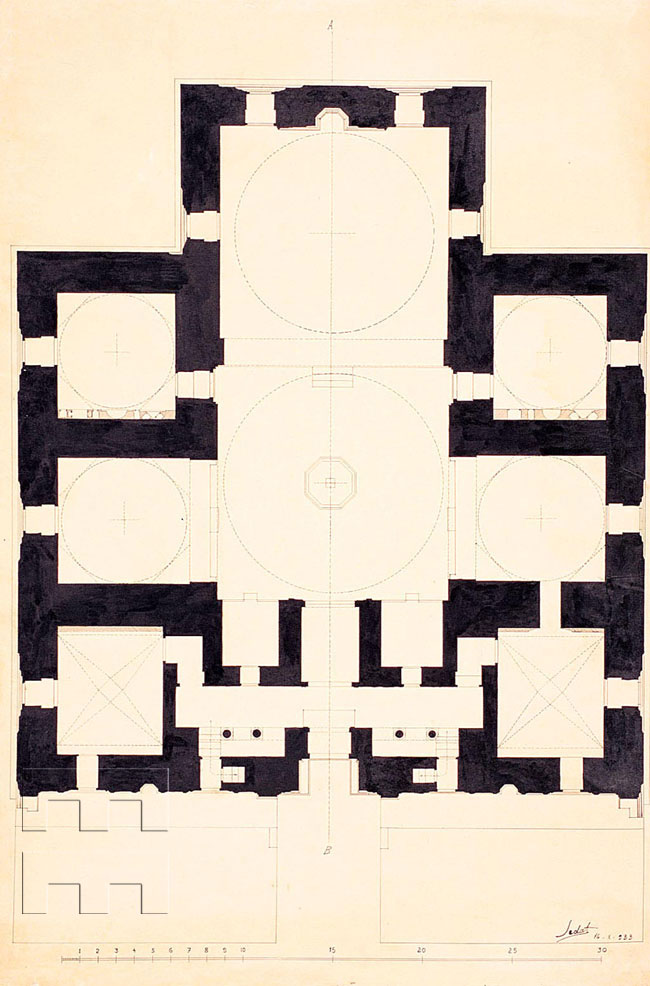
Example of a "T-plan" layout: the floor plan of the Green Mosque in Bursa

In 1334–1335 Orhan built a mosque outside the Yenişehir Gate in İznik which no longer stands but has been excavated and studied by archeologists. It is significant as the earliest known example of a type of a zaviye, also known as a "T-plan" mosque or "Bursa-type" mosque. This type of building is characterized by a central courtyard, typically covered by a dome, with iwans (domed or vaulted halls that are open to the courtyard) on three sides, one of which is oriented towards the qibla (direction of prayer) and contains the mihrab (wall niche symbolizing the qibla). The front façade usually incorporated a portico along its entire width. The iwans on the side and the other various rooms attached to these buildings may have served to house Sufi students and traveling dervishes, since the Sufi brotherhoods were one of the main supporters of the early Ottomans.

Variations of this floor plan were the most common type of major religious structure sponsored by the early Ottoman elites. The "Bursa-type" label comes from the fact that multiple examples of this kind were built in and around Bursa, including the Orhan Gazi Mosque (1339), the Hüdavendigar (Murad I) Mosque (1366–1385), the Yildirim Bayezid I Mosque (completed in 1395), and the Green Mosque built by Mehmed I. These mosques were all part of larger religious complexes (külliyes) that included other structures offering services such as madrasas (Islamic colleges), hammams (public bathhouses), and imarets (charitable kitchens).

The Green Mosque in Bursa, according to its inscriptions, was begun in 1412 and completed in December 1419 or January 1420 (Dhu'l-Hijja 822 AH), but its extravagant tile decoration is recorded as being completed in August 1424 (at the end of Ramadan 827). The tile decoration, which is present in both the mosque and the nearby mausoleum (Green Tomb) that accompanies it, is the first instance of this type of decoration in Ottoman architecture. The tiles are made in a cuerda seca technique which may have been imported to the region at this time by master tile-makers who were brought here from Tabriz in western Iran, which was under Timurid control. The Trabrizi origins of the craftsmen are recorded in some of the inscriptions. Scholar Doğan Kuban notes that the decoration of the mosque and tomb as a whole was likely a product of collaboration between craftsmen of different regions and that this was in line with the nature of Anatolian Islamic art and architecture in the preceding centuries.

Green Mosque (Mehmed I) complex in Bursa (1412–1424)

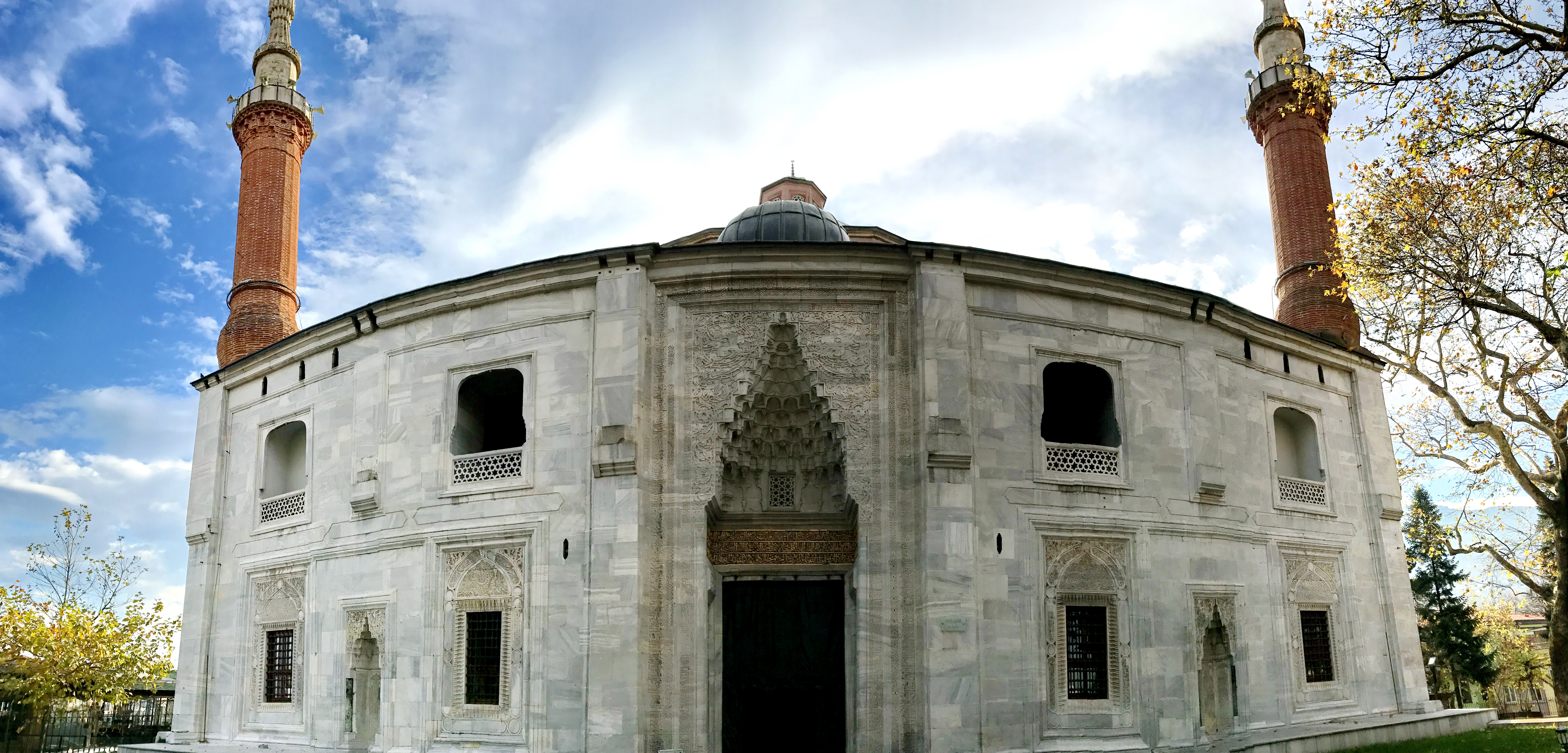
Green Mosque in Bursa: exterior façade and entrance portal

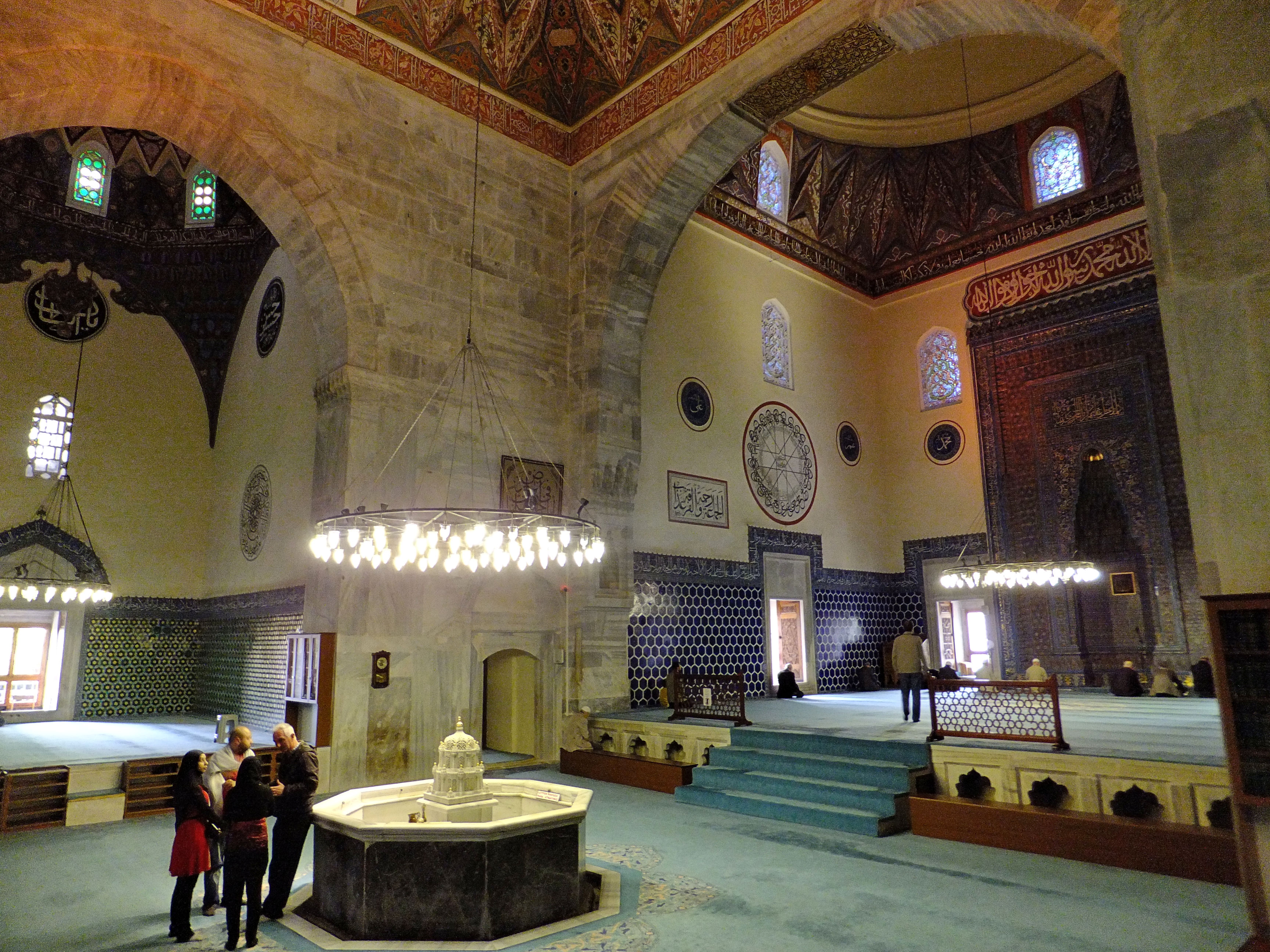
Green Mosque: interior

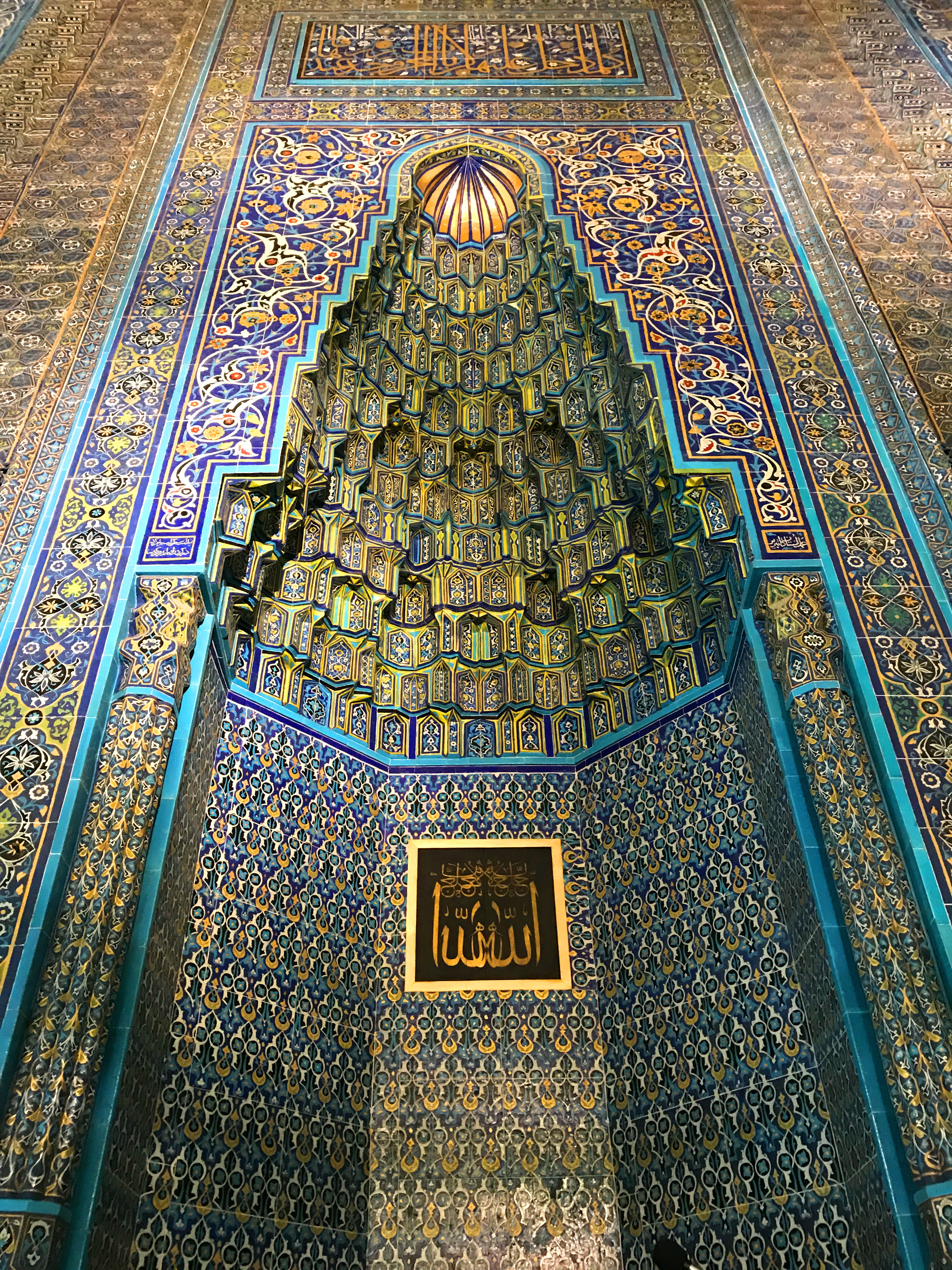
Green Mosque: mihrab and tile decoration

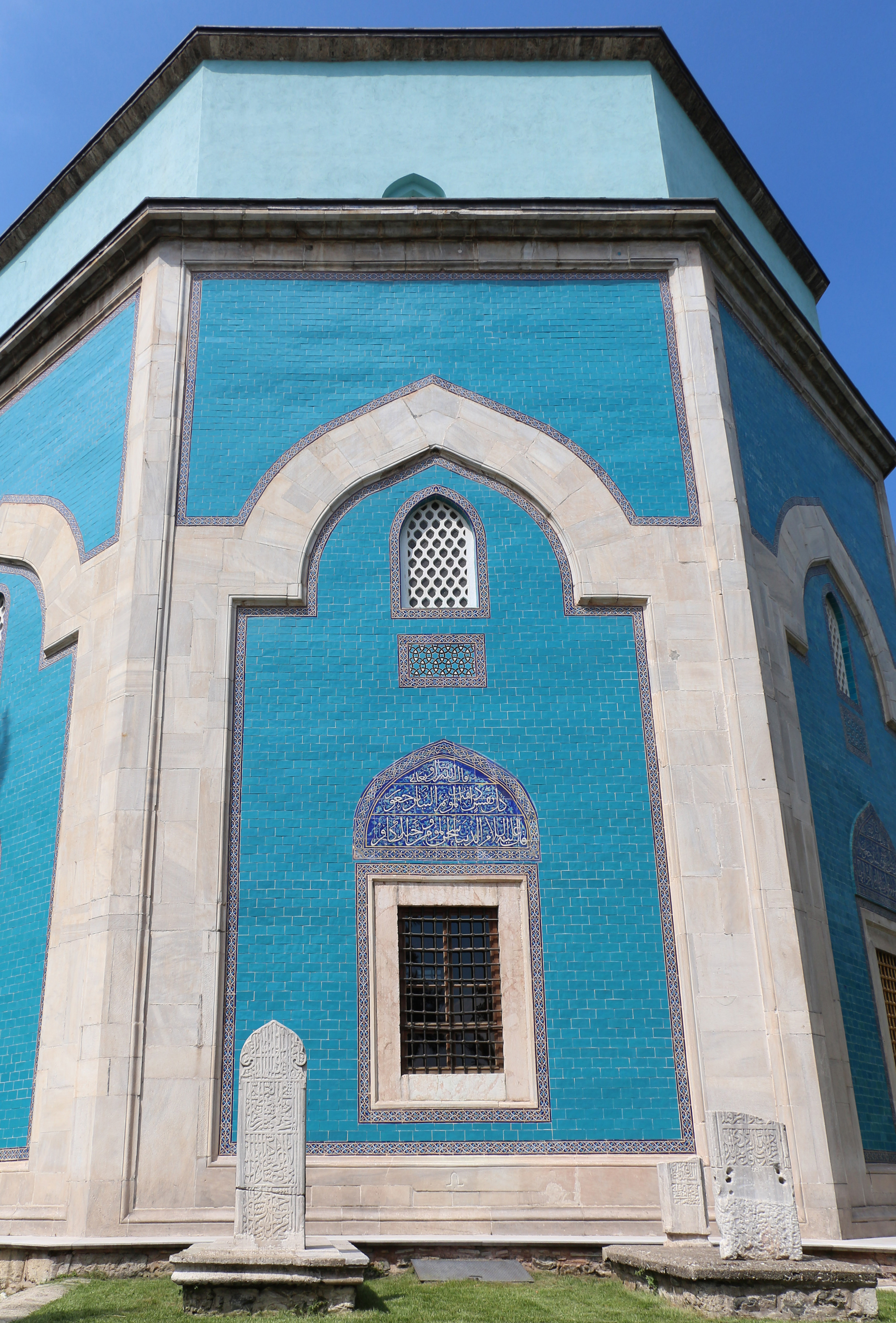
Green Tomb in Bursa, part of the Green Mosque complex

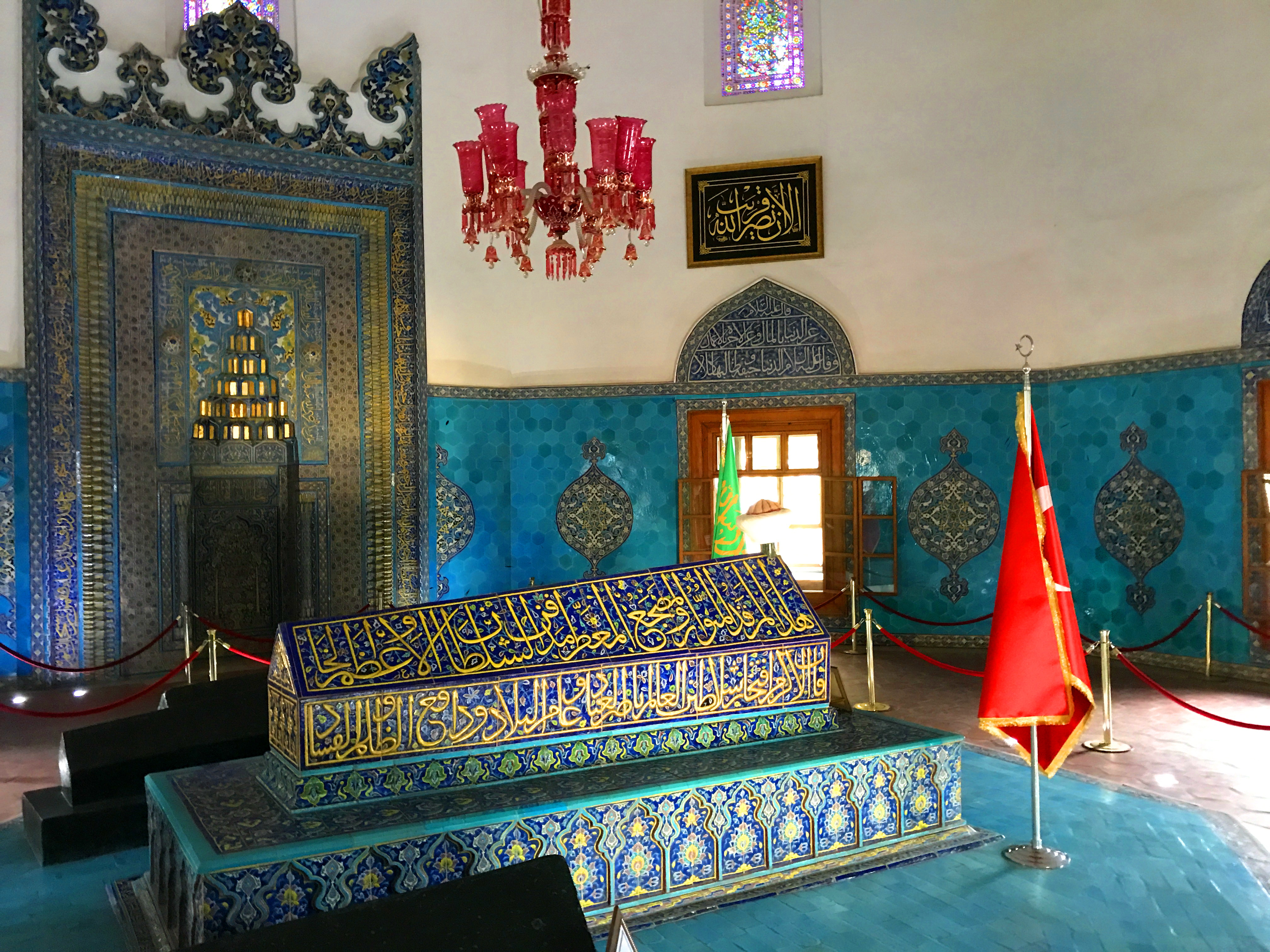
Interior of the Green Tomb

Notable examples of T-plan buildings beyond Bursa include the Firuz Bey Mosque in Milas, built in 1394 by a local Ottoman governor, and the Nilüfer Hatun Imaret in Iznik, originally a zaviye built in 1388 to honor Murad I's mother. The Firuz Bey Mosque is notable for being built in stone and featuring carved decoration of high quality. Two other T-plan examples, the Beylerbeyi Mosque in Edirne (1428–1429) and the Yahşi Bey Mosque in Izmir (circa 1441–1442), are both significant as later T-plan structures with more complex decorative roof systems. In both buildings the usual side iwans are replaced by separate halls accessed through doorways from the central space. As a result, prayers were probably only held in the qibla-oriented iwan, demonstrating how zaviye buildings were often not designed as simple mosques but had more complex functions instead. In both buildings the qibla iwan is semi-octagonal in shape and is covered by a semi-dome. Large muqarnas carvings, grooving, or other geometrical carvings decorate the domes and semi-domes.

Other T-plan mosques and buildings

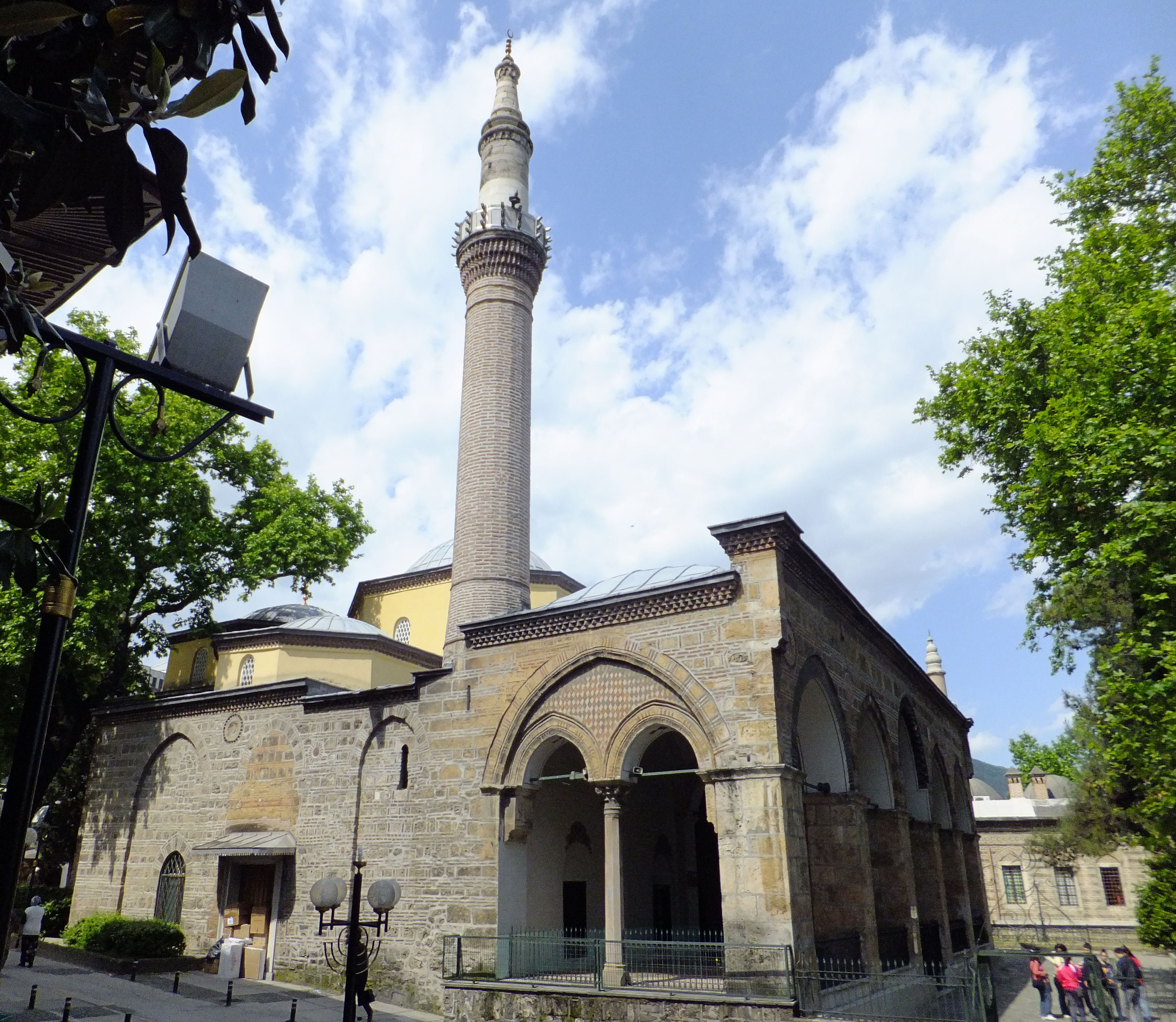
Orhan Gazi Mosque in Bursa (1339): exterior and front portico

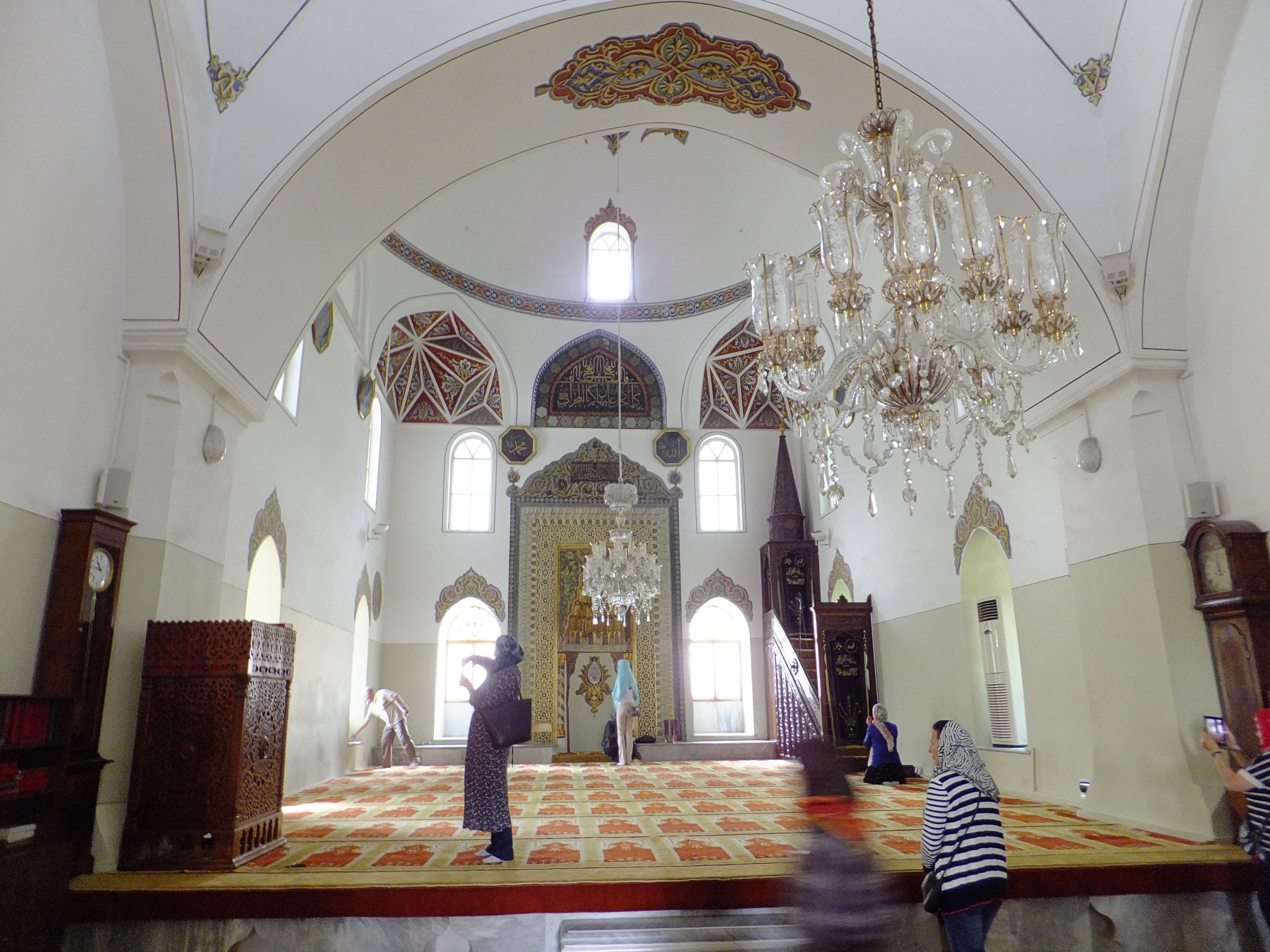
Orhan Gazi Mosque: interior prayer hall, view towards the qibla

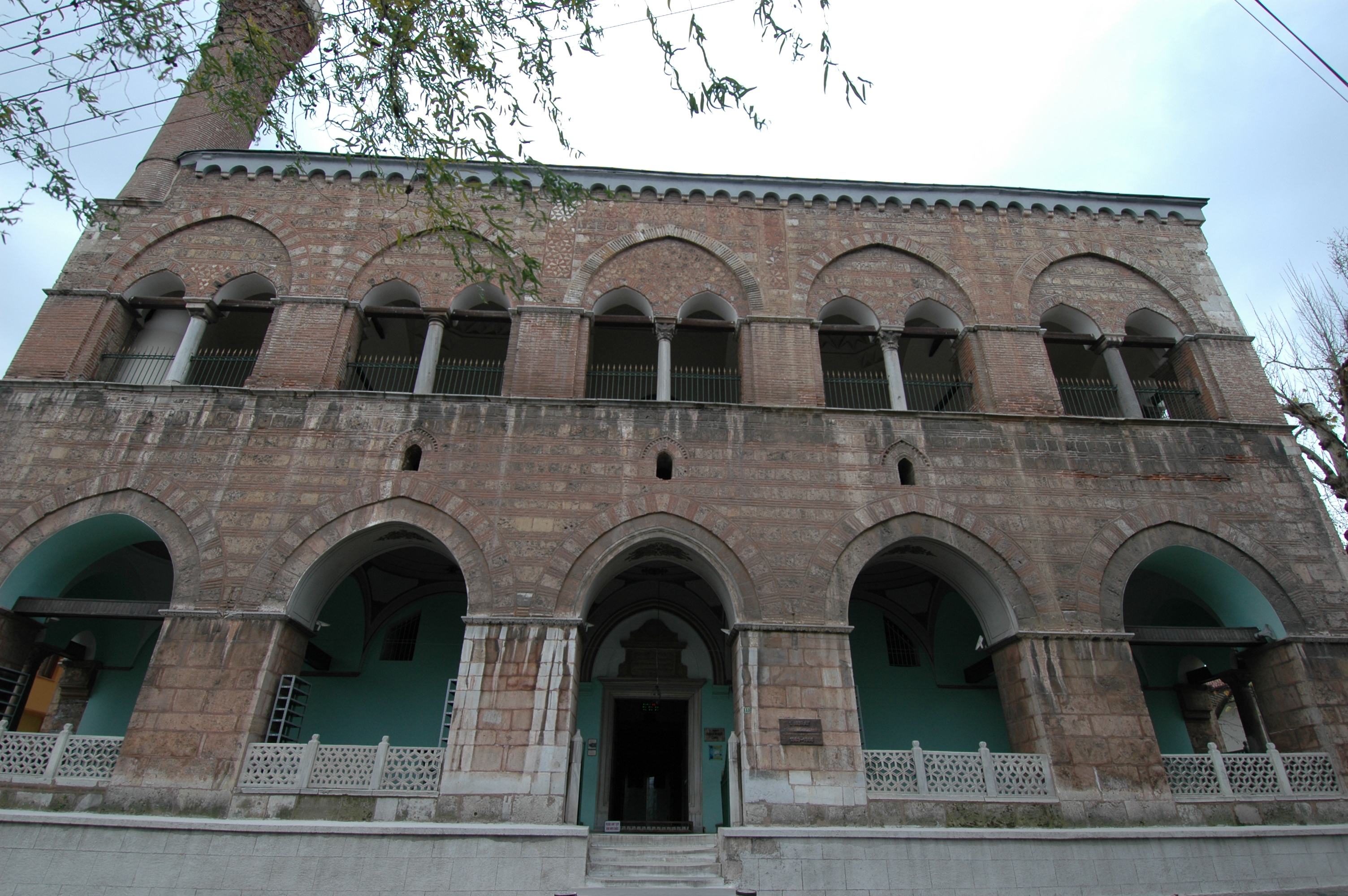
Hüdavendigar Mosque in Bursa (1366–1385): front façade

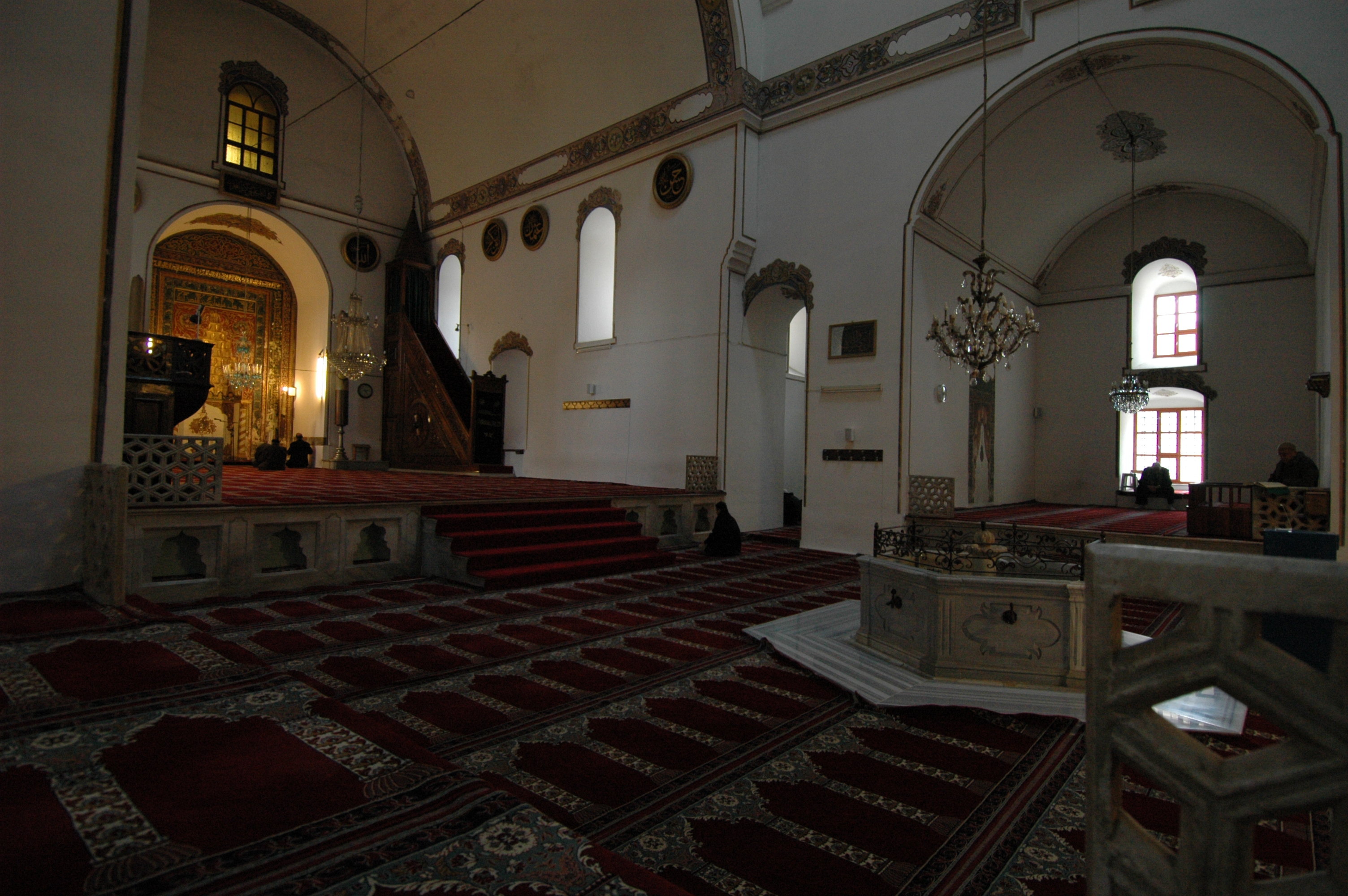
Hüdavendigar Mosque: interior of the prayer hall

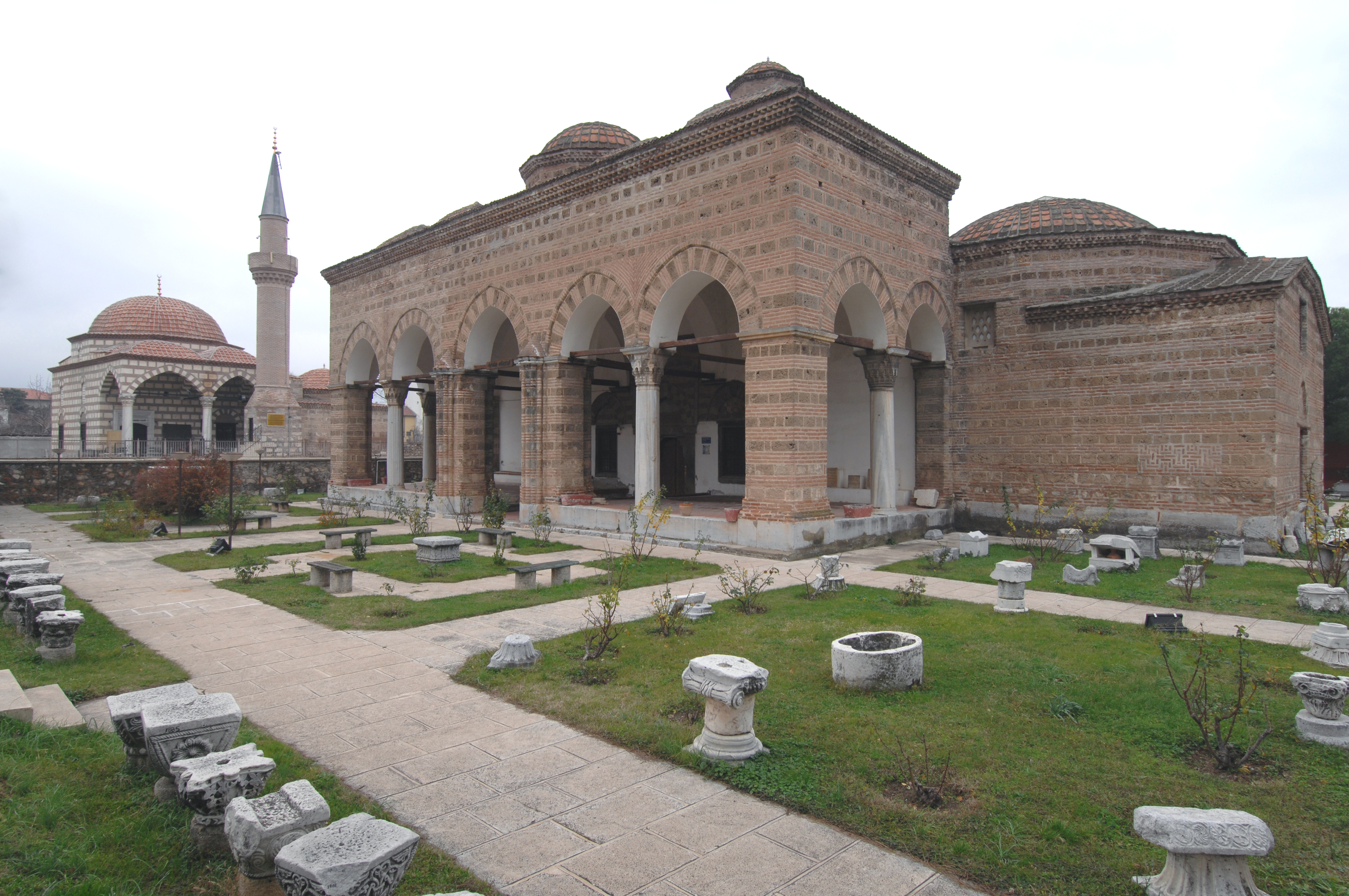
Nilüfer Hatun Imaret in Iznik (1388)

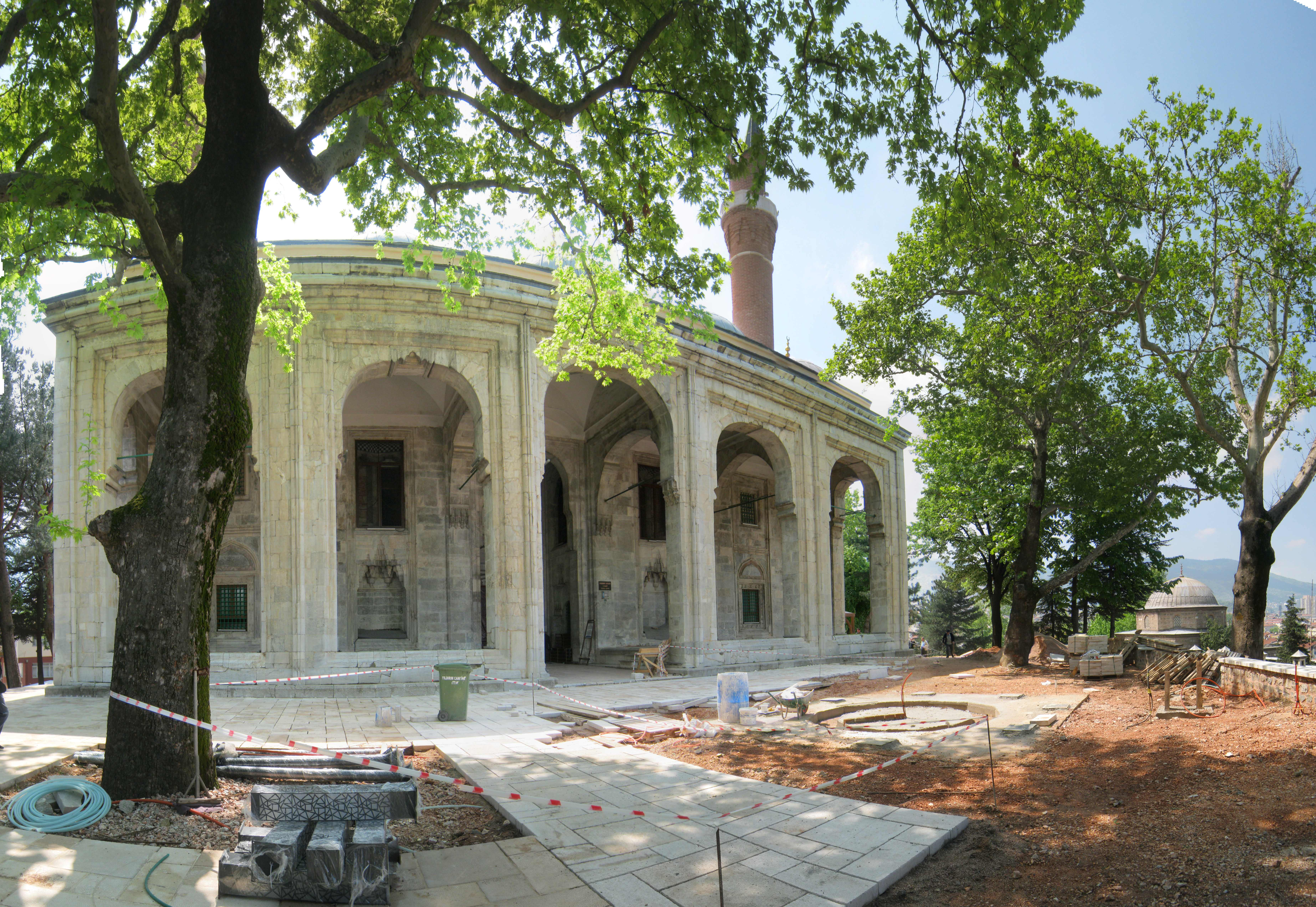
Yıldırım Bayezid I Mosque in Bursa (1395): exterior and portico

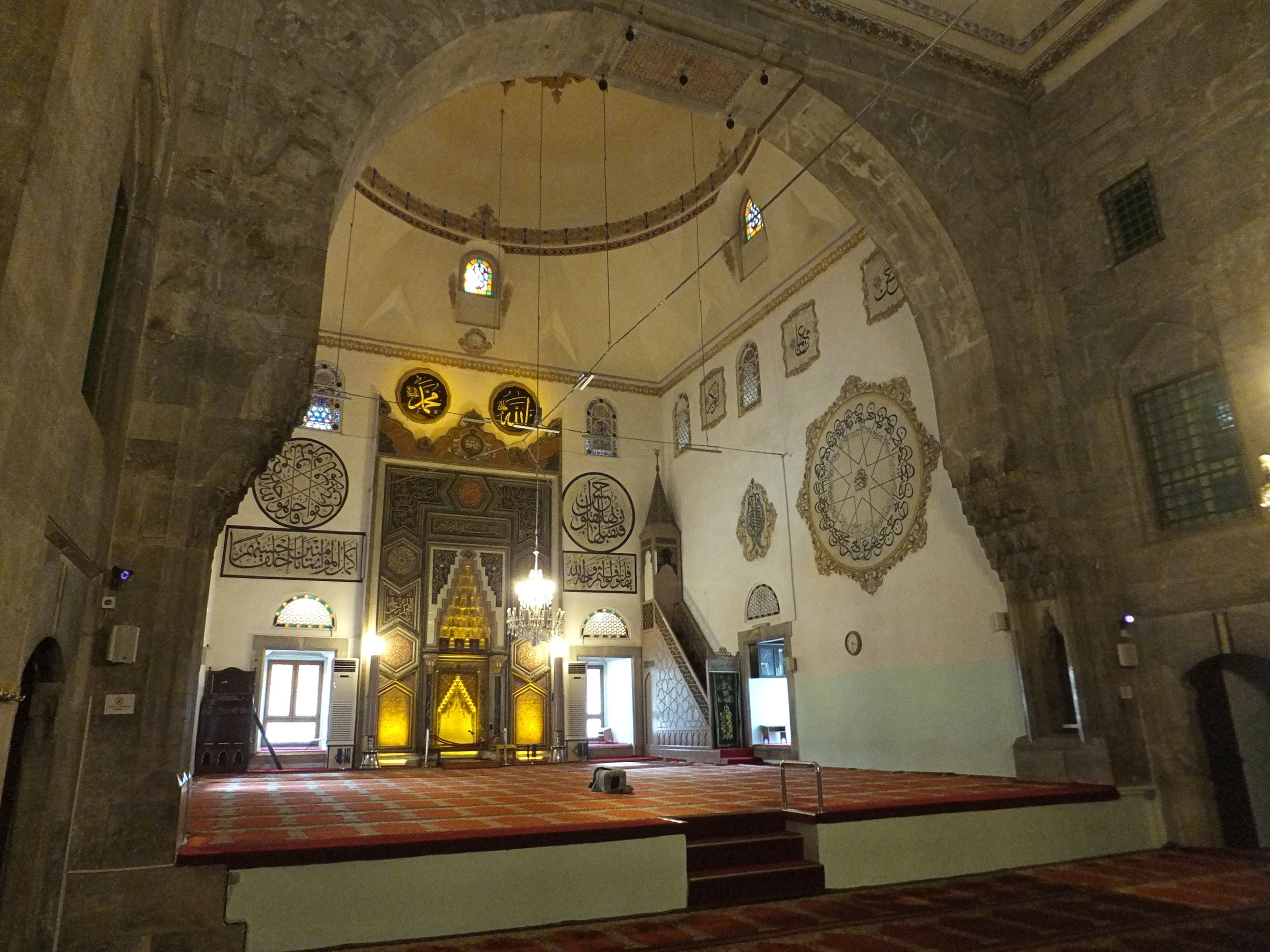
Yıldırım Bayezid I Mosque: interior view towards the qibla iwan

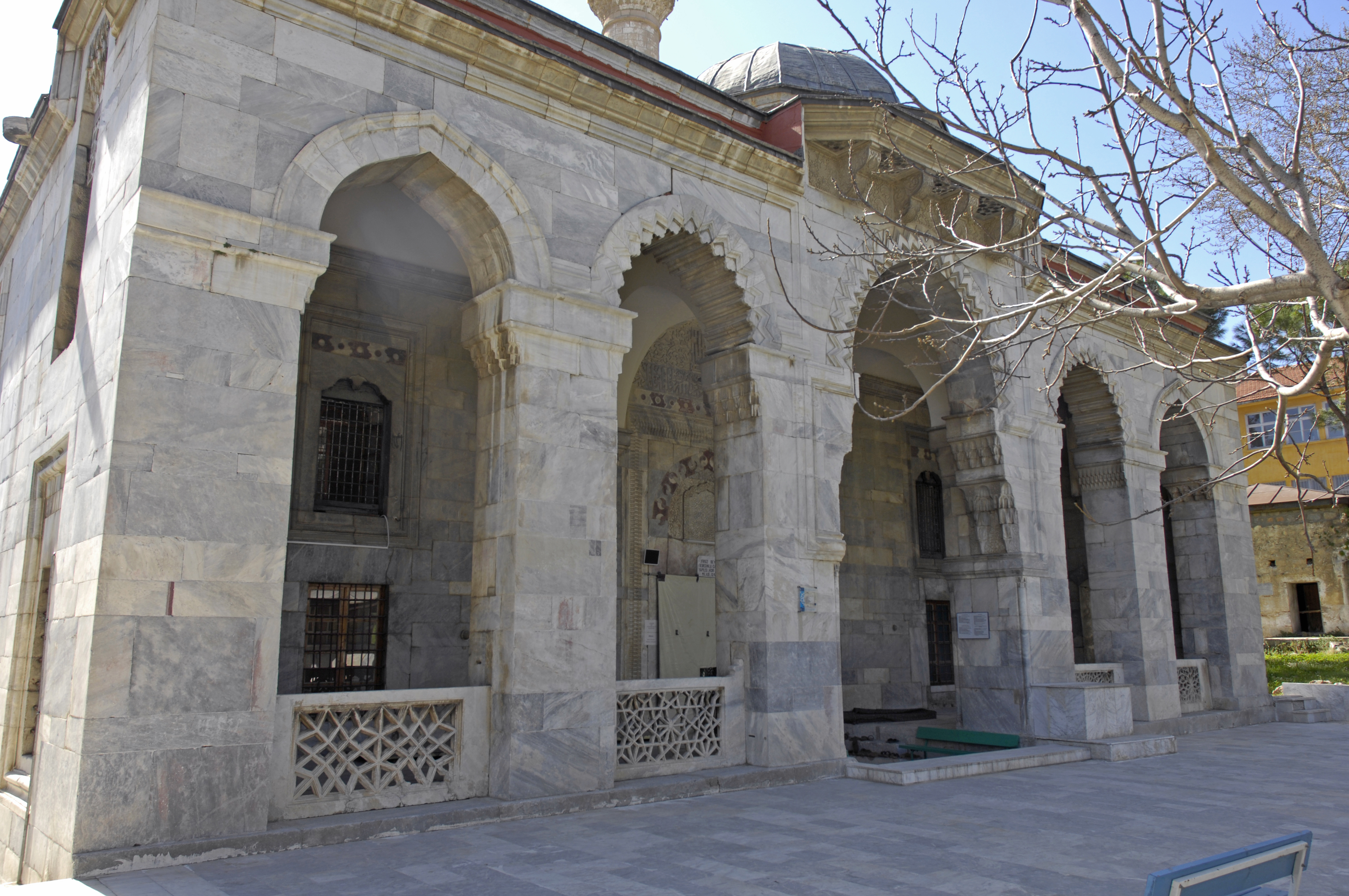
Firuz Bey Mosque in Milas (1394): exterior façade

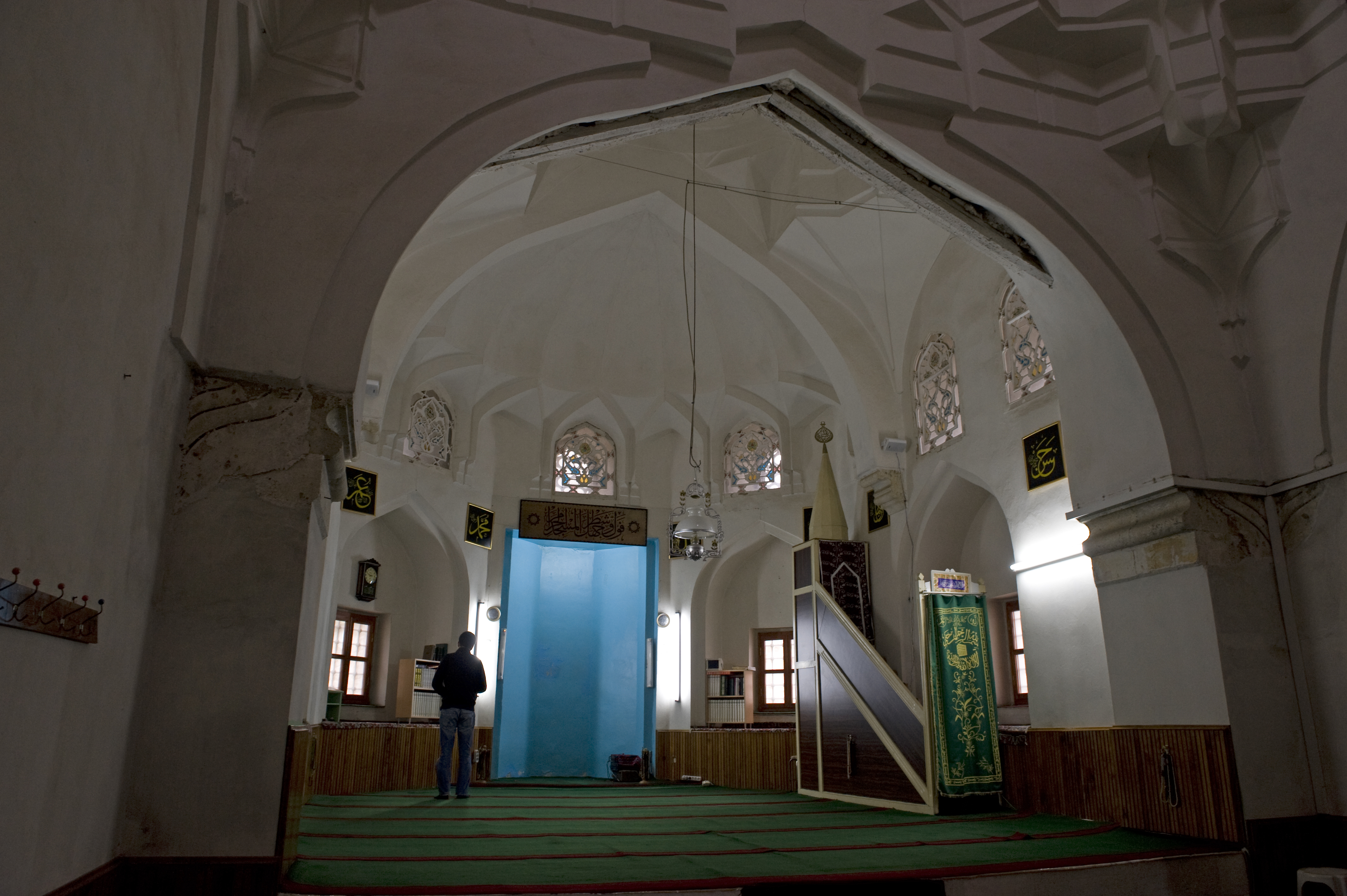
Beylerbeyi Mosque in Edirne (1428–1429): interior view of the qibla iwan

=== Multi-domed buildings ===
The most unusual mosque of this period is the congregational mosque known as the Great Mosque of Bursa or Ulu Cami. The mosque was commissioned by Bayezid I and funded by the booty from his victory at the Battle of Nicopolis in 1396. It was finished a few years later in 1399–1400. It is a multi-dome mosque, consisting of a large hypostyle hall divided into twenty equal bays in a rectangular four-by-five grid, each covered by a dome supported by stone piers. The dome over the middle bay of the second row has an oculus and its floor is occupied by a fountain, serving a role similar to the sahn (courtyard) in the mosques of other regions. The minbar (pulpit) of the mosque is among the finest examples of early Ottoman wooden minbars made with the kündekari technique, in which pieces of wood are fitted together without nails or glue. Its surfaces are decorated with inscriptions, floral (arabesque) motifs, and geometric motifs.

Grand Mosque of Bursa (1396–1400)

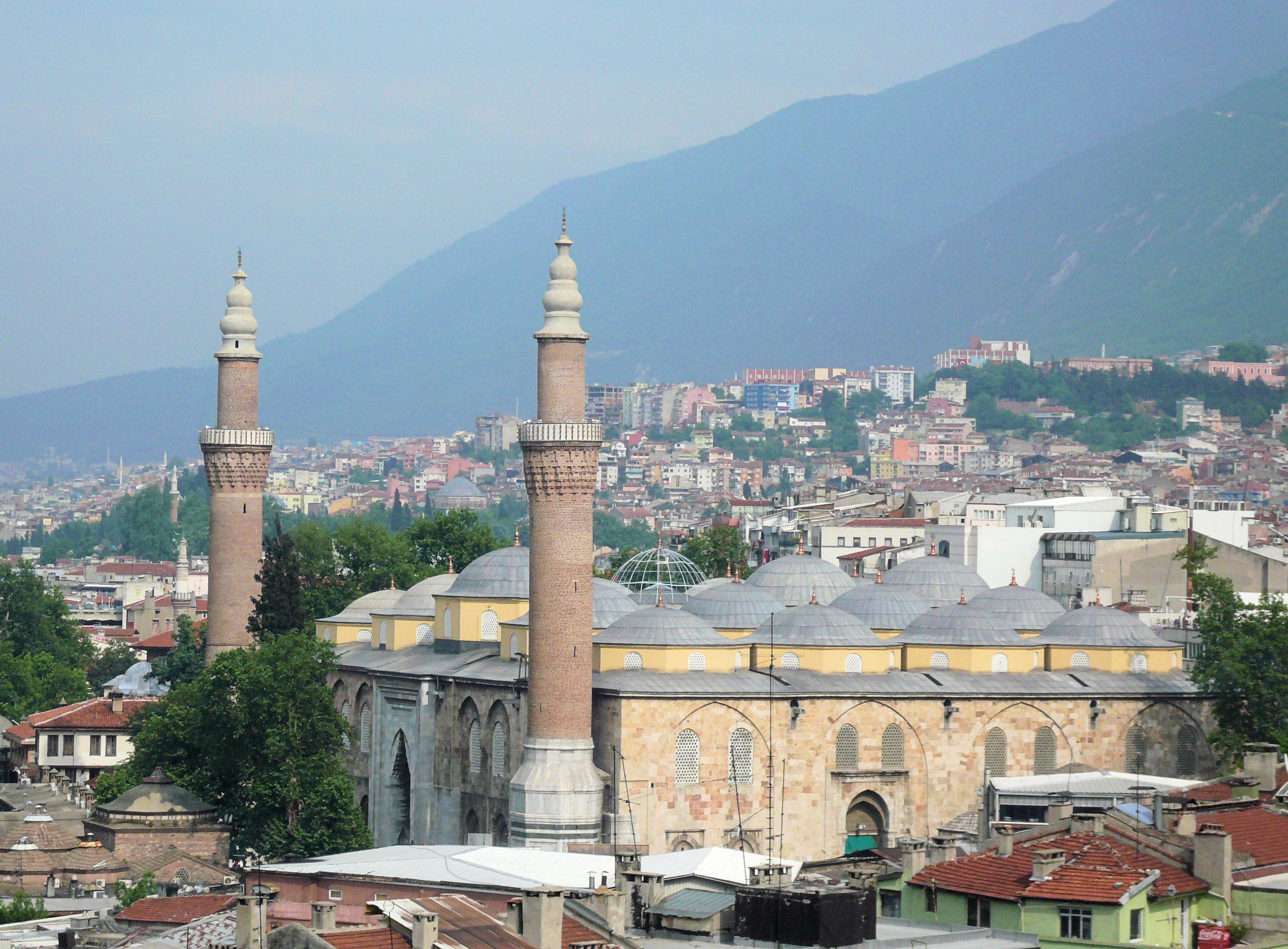
Exterior of the Grand Mosque of Bursa

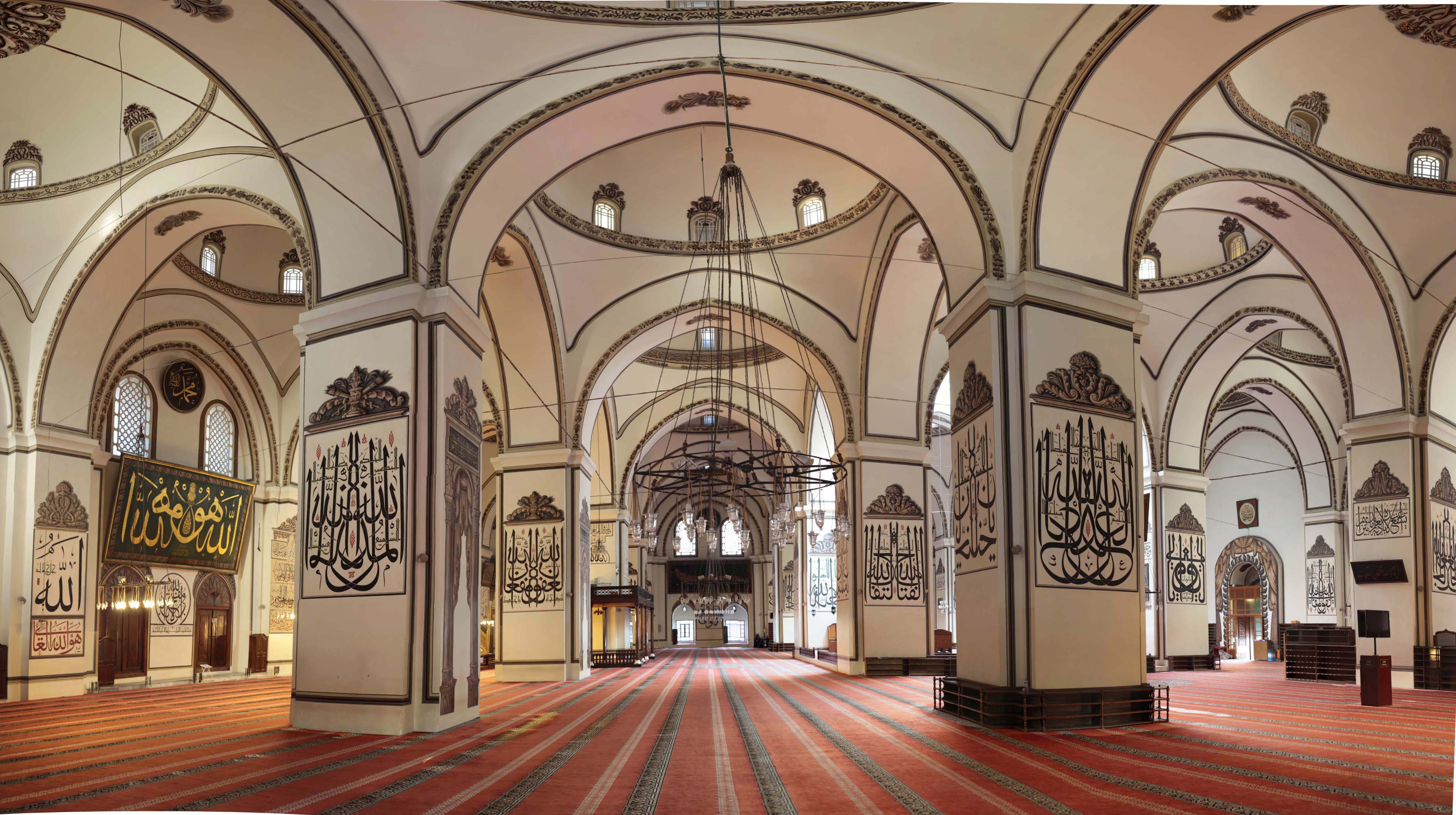
Interior of the Grand Mosque of Bursa

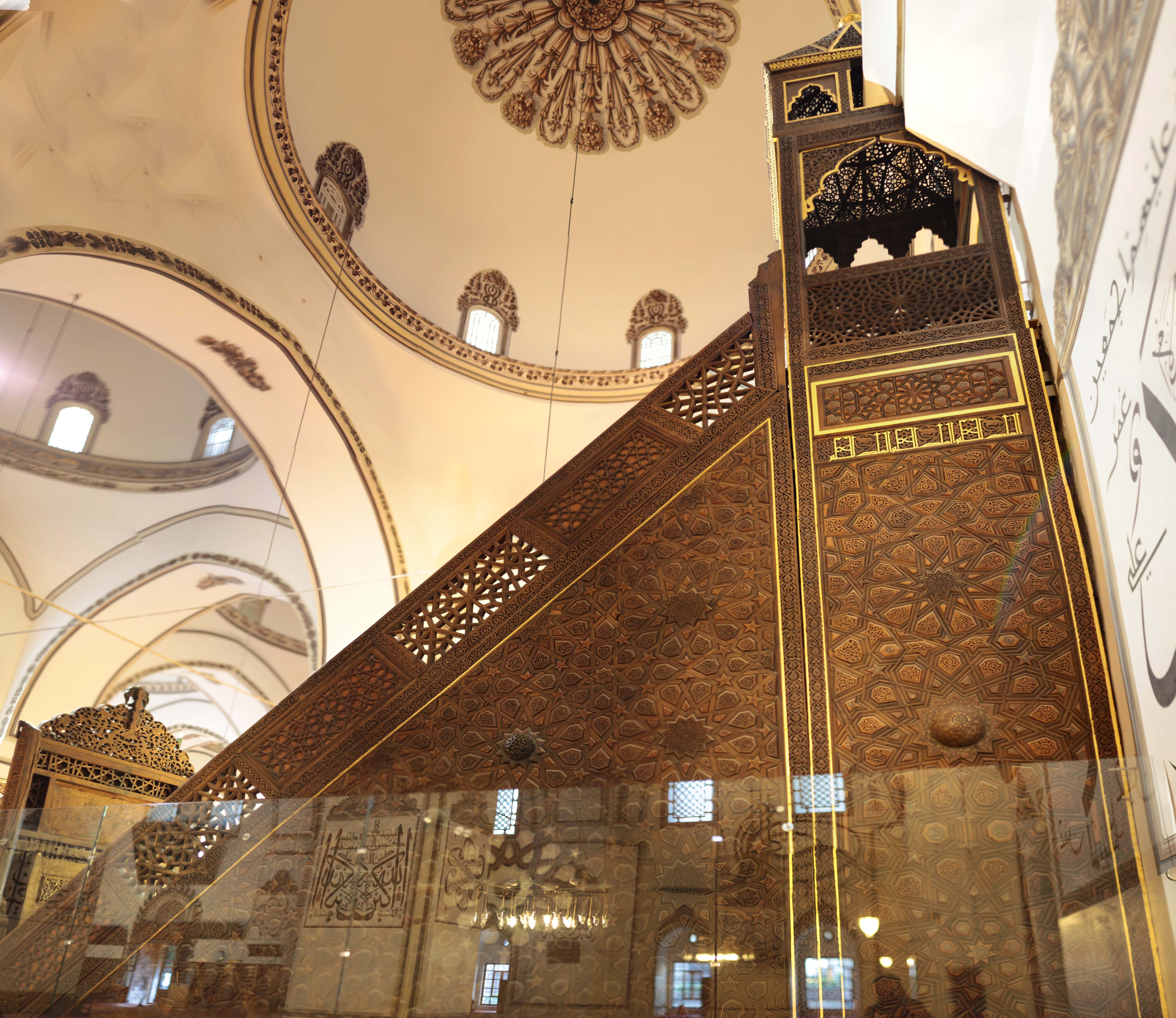
Wooden minbar in the Grand Mosque of Bursa

According to Doğan Kuban, some of the earliest Ottoman "great mosques" (Ulu camis) were built by Murad I in a style that is typologically related to the later multi-domed "Great Mosques". Their interiors were not roofed entirely by domes, but they had three "naves" or aisles running between the supporting pillars of the building towards the qibla wall. The middle nave was wider and covered by two or three large domes, while the side naves had lower vaulted ceilings. The only surviving example of these early three-nave mosques is the Great Mosque of Plovdiv. This mosque is traditionally believed to have been built by Murad I after he conquered Plovdiv (Philippopolis or Filibe) in 1363, but more recent studies have indicated that it was built (or rebuilt) instead by Murad II between 1433 and 1436. Other mosques from the time of Murad I that appear to have had a similar layout were the Şehadet Mosque in Bursa and the Hüdavendigar Mosque at Gelibolu (Gallipoli), but these were destroyed in modern times. Scholar Zeynep Yürekli states that the lack of well-preserved and reliably-dated examples makes it difficult to understand the evolution of Ottoman "great mosques" prior to the mosque of Bayezid I in Bursa.

After Bayezid I suffered a disastrous defeat in 1402 at the Battle of Ankara against Timur, the capital was moved to Edirne in Thrace. Another multi-dome congregational mosque was begun here by Suleyman Çelebi in 1403 and finished by Mehmed I in 1414. It is known today as the Old Mosque (Eski Cami). It is slightly smaller than the Bursa Grand Mosque, consisting of a square floor plan divided into nine domed bays supported by four piers. This was the last major multi-dome mosque built by the Ottomans (with some exceptions such as the later Piyale Pasha Mosque). In later periods, the multi-dome building type was adapted for use in non-religious buildings instead. One example of this is the bedesten – a kind of market hall at the center of a bazaar – which Bayezid I built in Bursa during his reign. A similar bedesten was built in Edirne by Mehmed I between 1413 and 1421.

Other multi-domed mosques and buildings

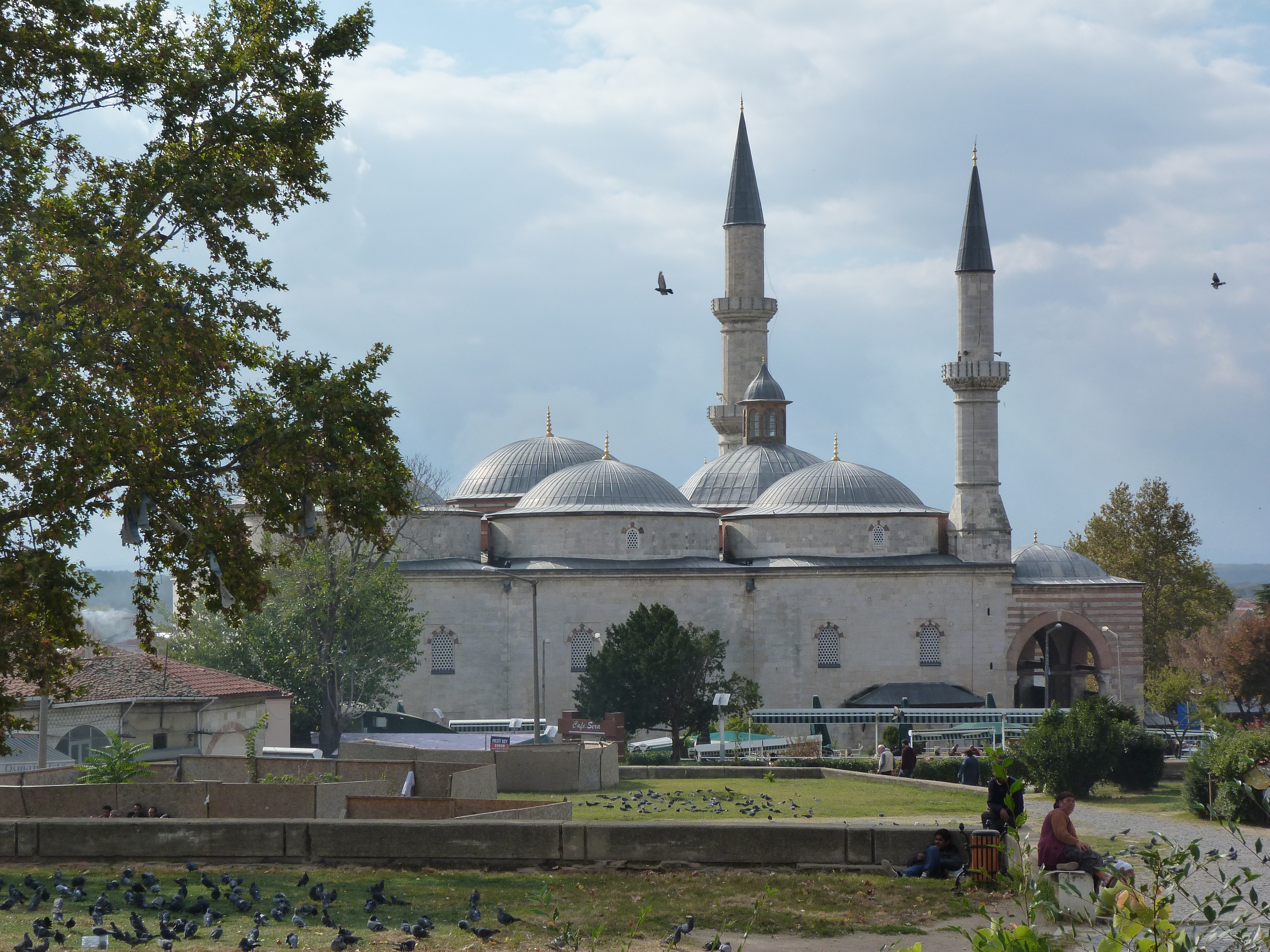
Old Mosque of Edirne (1403–1414)

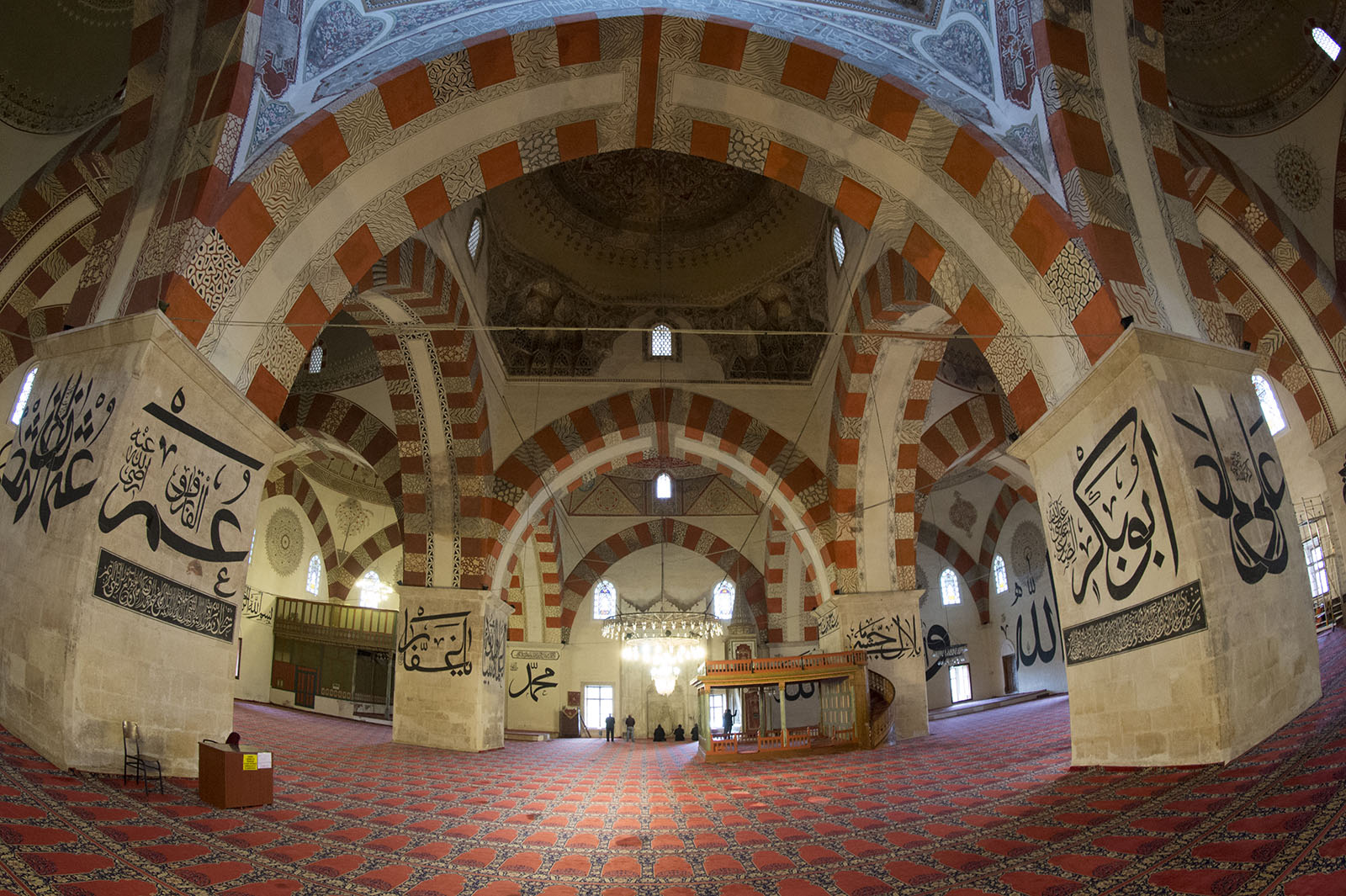
Interior of the Old Mosque of Edirne

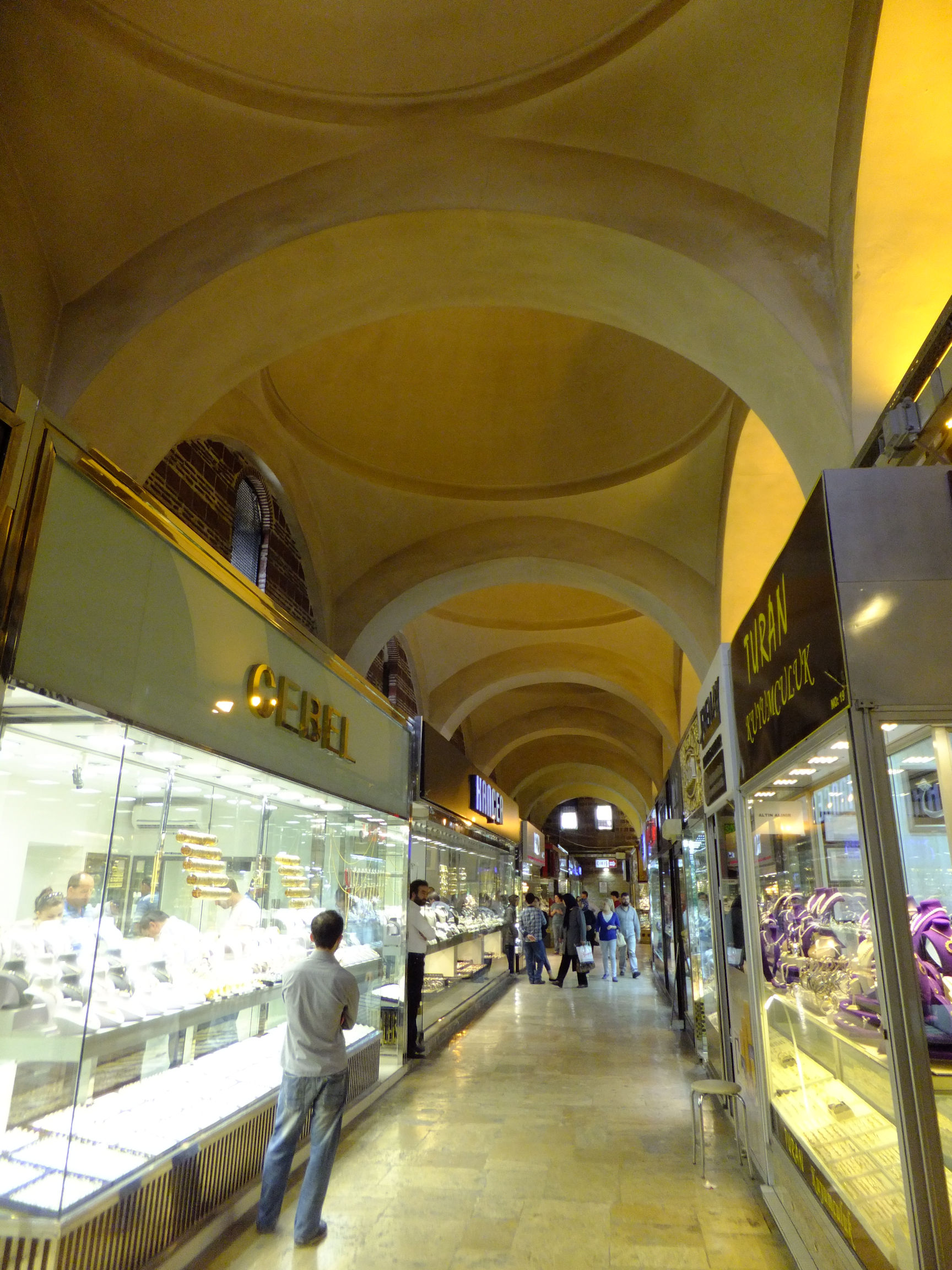
Interior of the Bedesten of Bursa (built between 1389 and 1402; with modern-day shops seen here)

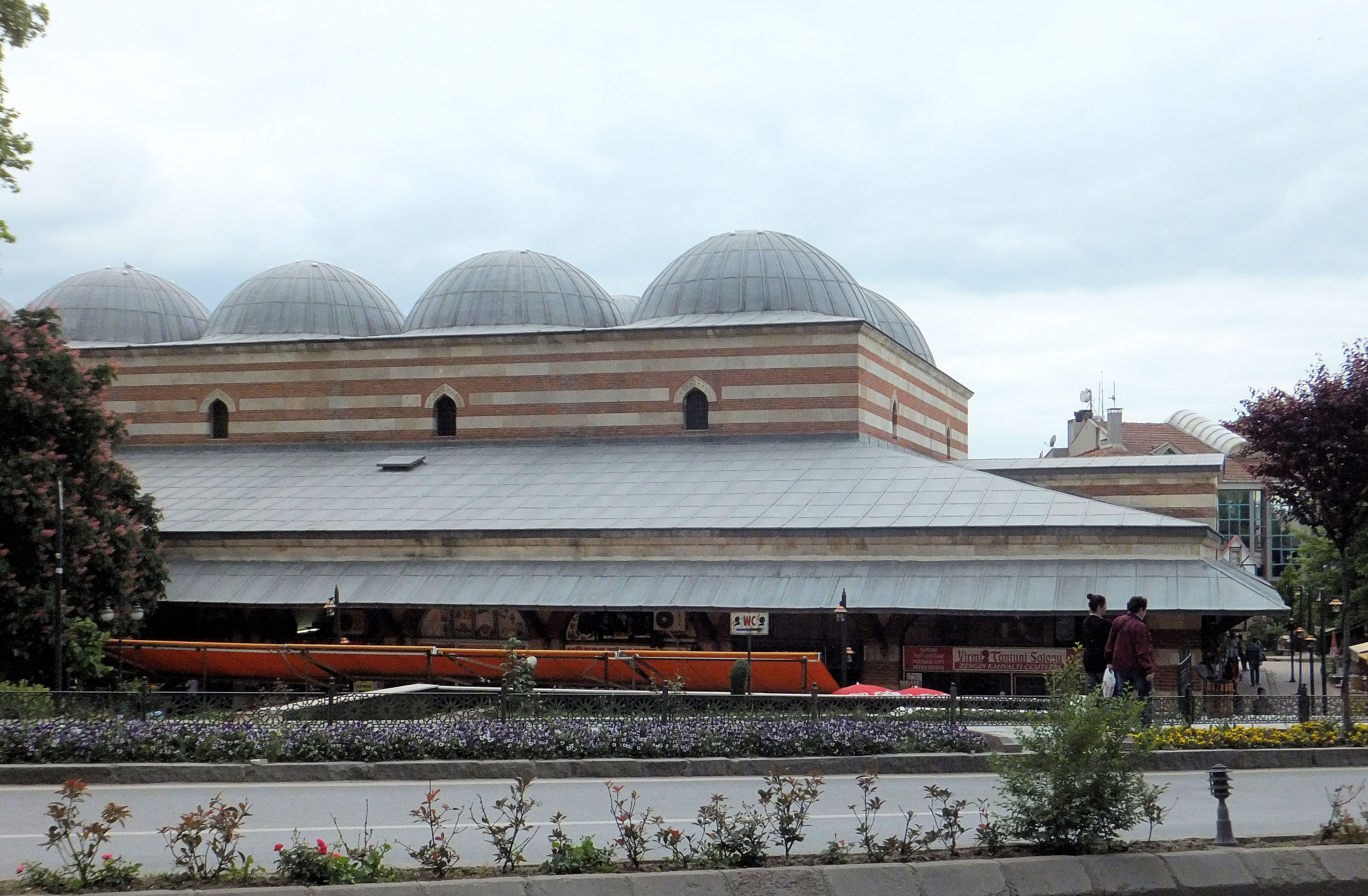
Exterior view of the Bedesten of Edirne (between 1413 and 1421)

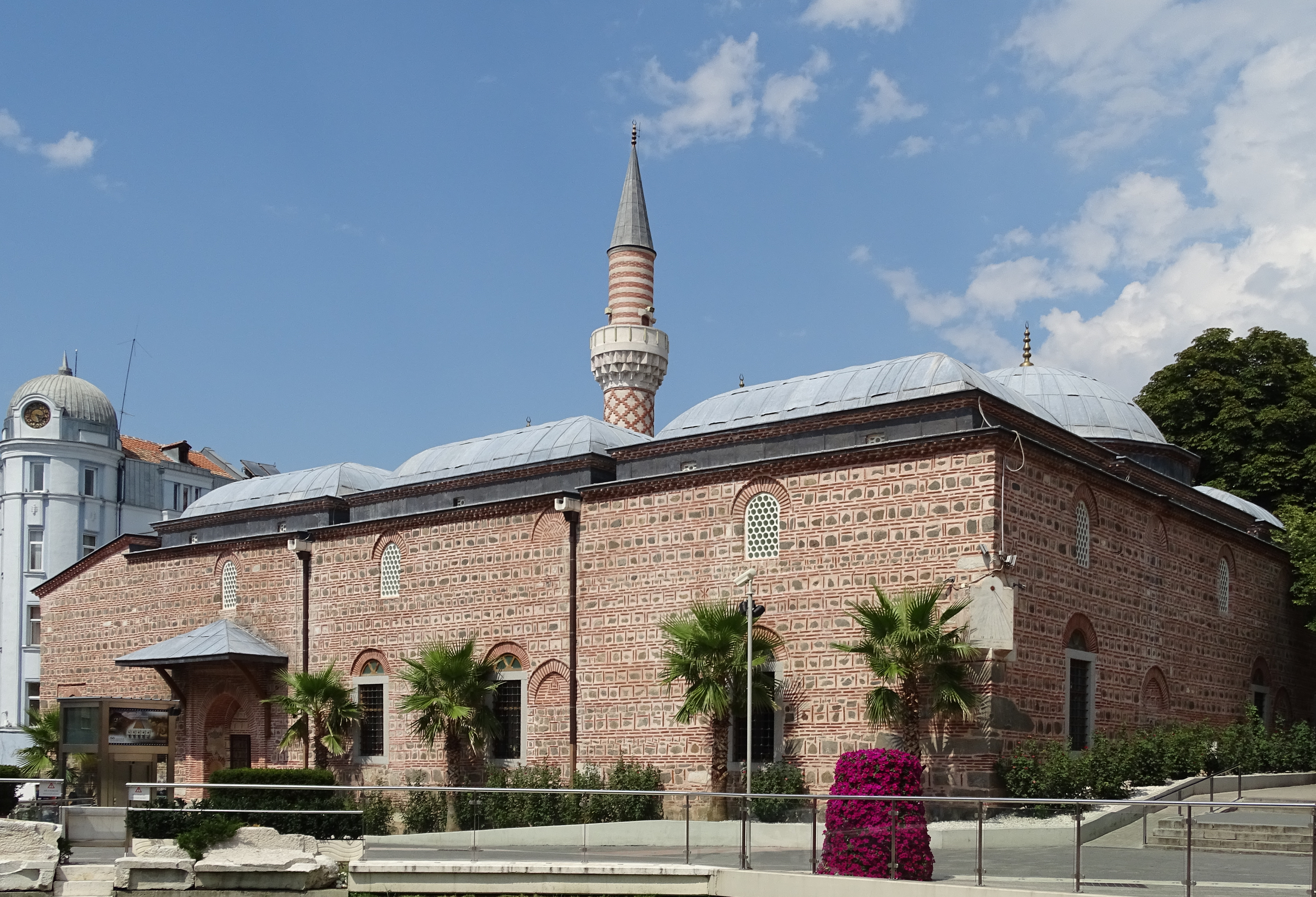
The Great Mosque (Dzhumaya Mosque) of Plovdiv, probably built by Murad II (circa 1436)

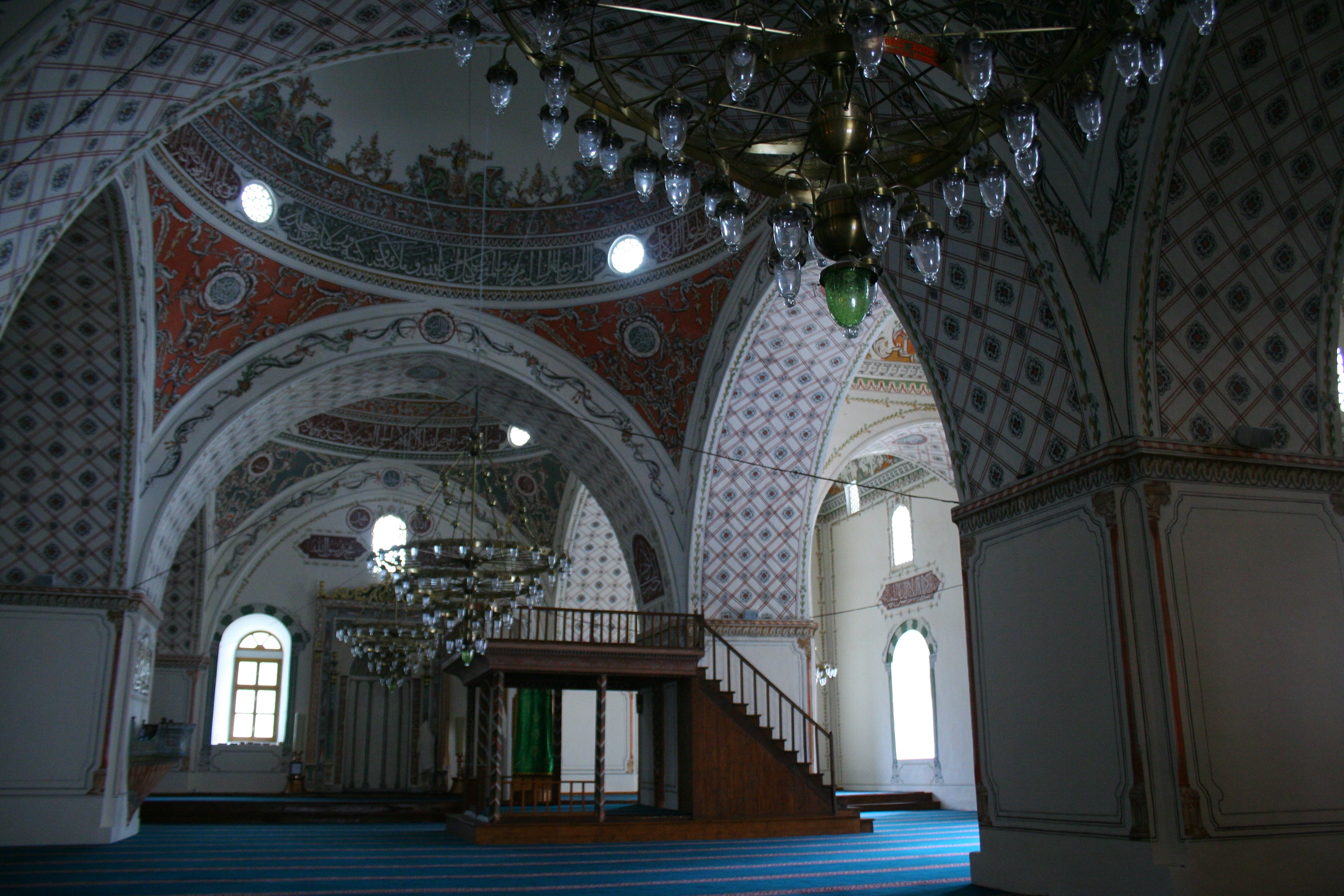
Interior of the Great Mosque of Plovdiv

=== Madrasas ===
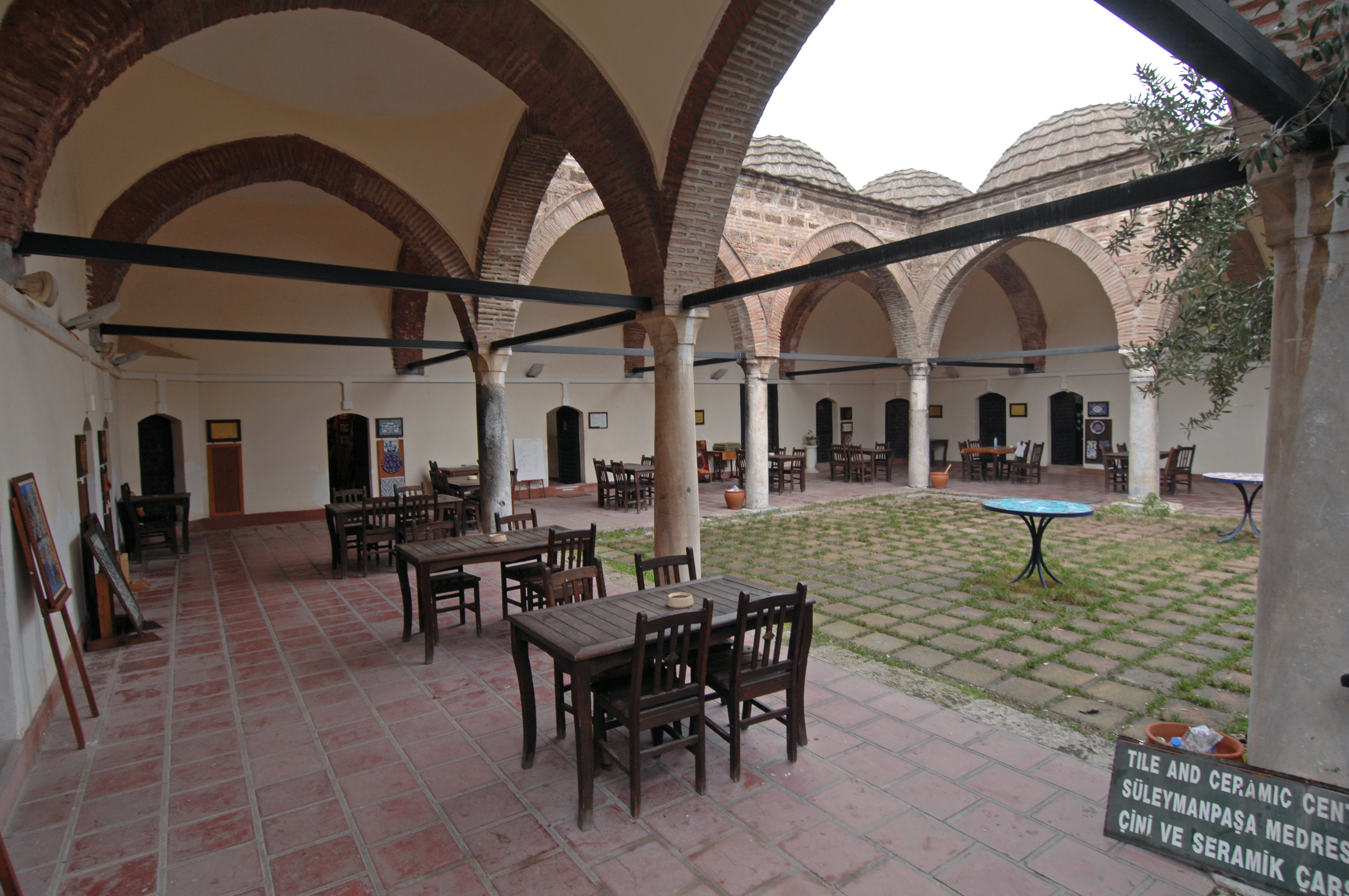
Süleyman Pasha Medrese in Iznik, the oldest surviving Ottoman madrasa, originally constructed in the mid-14th century though significantly restored in modern times

Madrasas had existed since the Seljuk era and continued to perform the same function of teaching Sunni Islamic law and educating the ulema (Islamic legal scholars). Compared to earlier Seljuk madrasas, however, their architecture was much less ostentatious. Moreover, relatively few madrasas are known to have been built in the 14th century, which indicates that the ulema did not yet have a major influence in Ottoman society at this time. Madrasas were sometimes built as independent structures but were often part of a larger külliye complex.

The typical madrasa layout was dominated by a large internal courtyard (usually rectangular) with arcades running along two or more sides. Around the courtyard were rooms which provided accommodation for students and there was usually one large domed classroom known as a dershane. If the building was aligned with the qibla, the dershane could also serve as a small mosque or prayer room, but this was only the case for a few madrasas in this period. At the center of the courtyard was a pool which provided water. Latrine facilities were usually built in a separate building nearby in early madrasas, but later examples incorporated them into the main madrasa structure. Architectural decoration was mostly limited to the main entrance portal of the building.

The oldest known Ottoman madrasa still standing is the Süleyman Pasha Medrese in Iznik built by Süleyman Pasha (d. 1357), the son of Orhan. It does not have an inscription, but is estimated to have been built around the mid-14th century. The original form of the building is uncertain as it was later damaged and restored in modern times, but it does have the typical open courtyard surrounded by small domed rooms, including a modest dershane. Orhan built two other madrasas in Bursa, but these have not been preserved. The only other 14th century madrasa to be preserved is one of the two madrasas that were built for the külliye complex of Yildirim Bayezid I in Bursa (circa 1395). It was severely damaged and extensively reconstructed in the 19th century. This madrasa has an elongated courtyard and an entrance consisting of an iwan covered by a dome, which might represent a transition from the form of Seljuk madrasas to that of Ottoman madrasas. At least a couple of medreses in the early 15th century, including the Yakub Bey Medrese in Kütahya (circa 1412) and the Hacı Halil Pasha Medrese in Gümüşhacıköy (1413–1415), were built in the "closed" medrese style of the earlier Seljuk period, meaning that the central courtyard was (originally) covered by a dome. The madrasa of Mehmed I's Green Mosque complex in Bursa (circa 1421) is a particularly elegant and well-planned example of the open courtyard madrasa in this period, with similarities to the "open" madrasa of the Seljuk era. It has a decorated entrance iwan which leads to an inner courtyard with arcaded porticos along three sides and a domed dershane on the side opposite the entrance. Two small iwans are also found along the two other lateral sides of the courtyard, though they stand behind the porticos. Overall, the diversity of madrasa layouts in the early 15th century demonstrates that a certain amount of experimentation was taking place around this time before the more classical madrasa form emerged later that century.

Early Ottoman madrasas

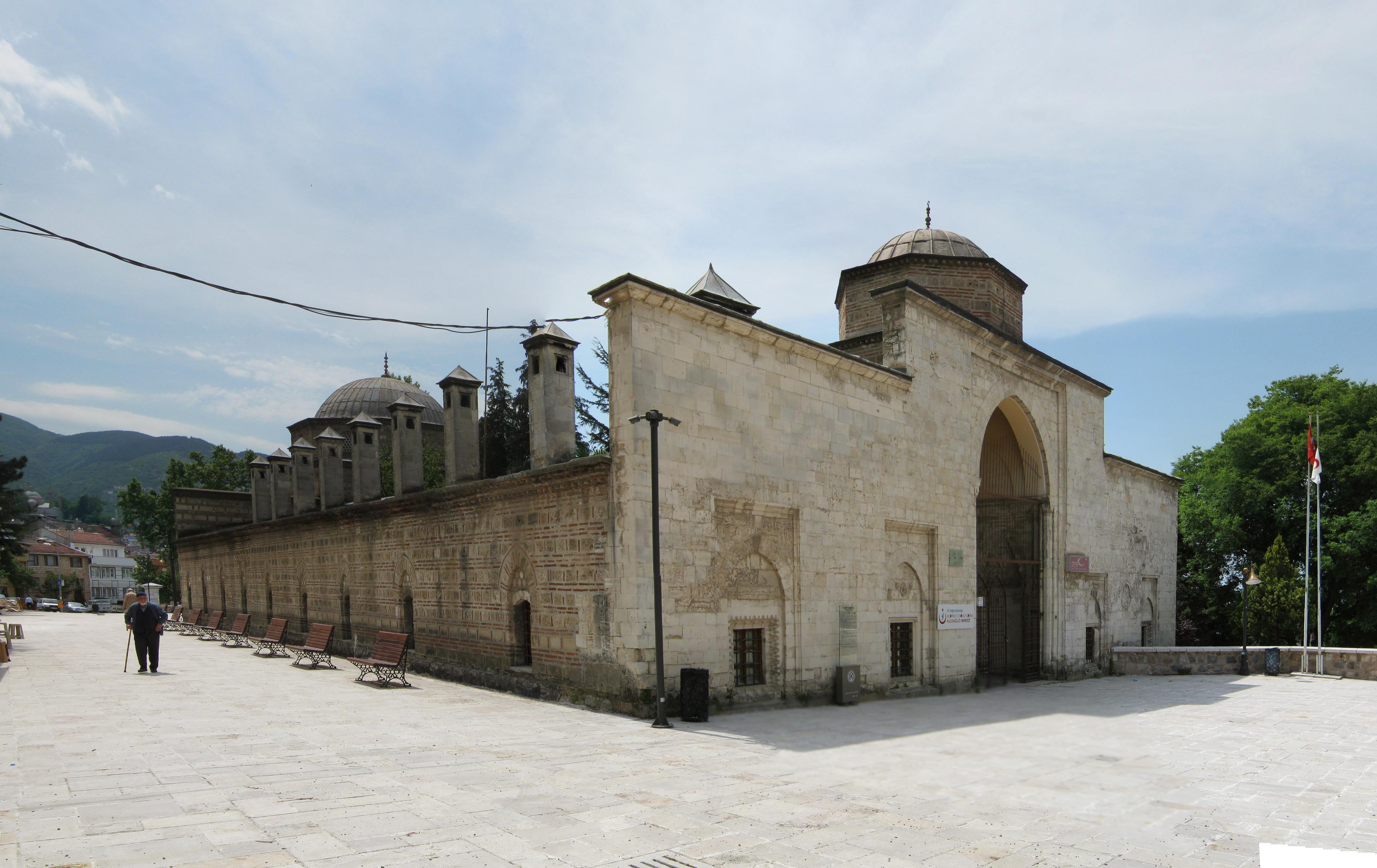
Madrasa of the Yıldırım Bayezid I Mosque complex in Bursa (circa 1395)

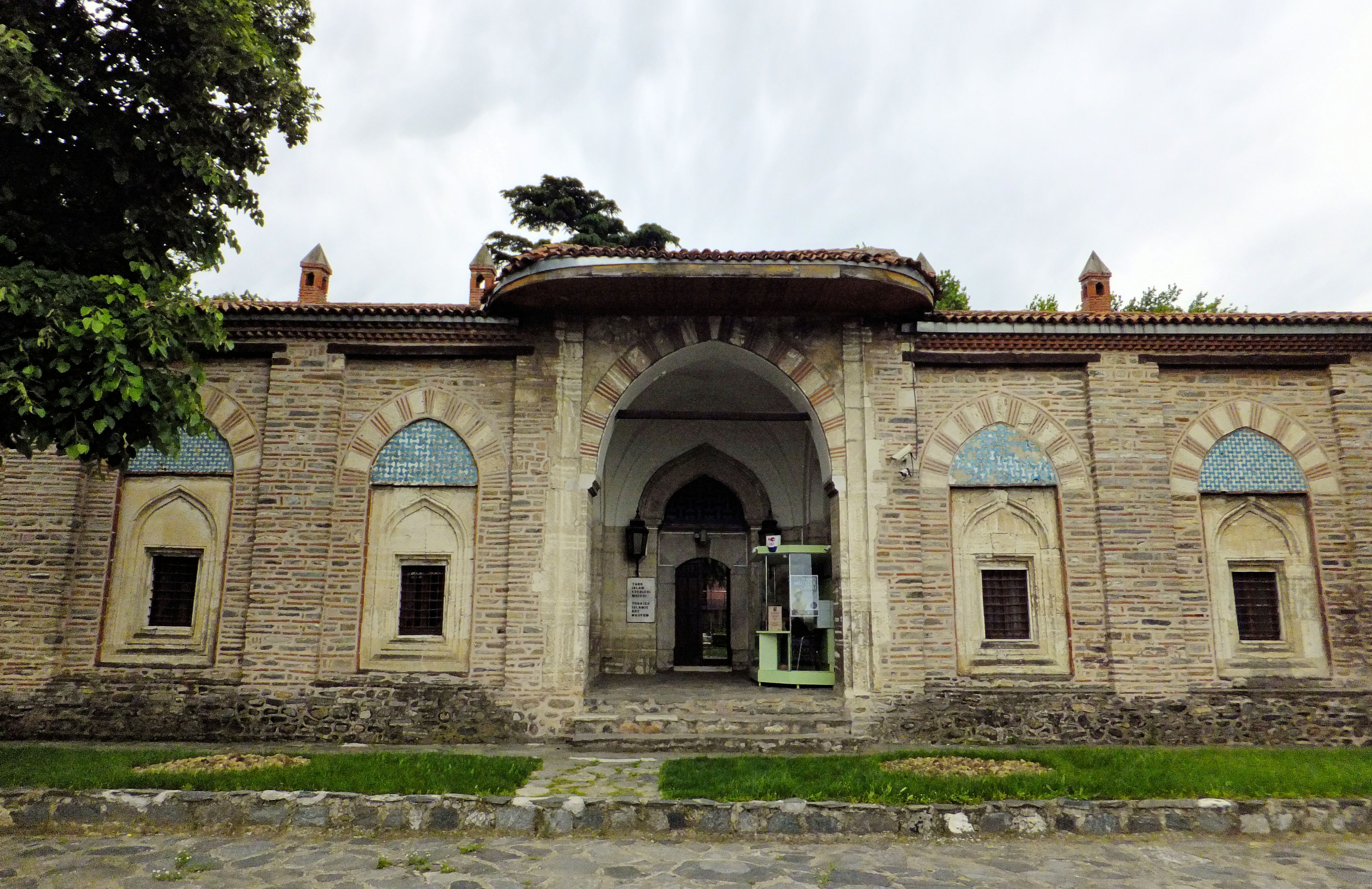
Entrance façade of the madrasa of the Green Mosque complex in Bursa (circa 1421)

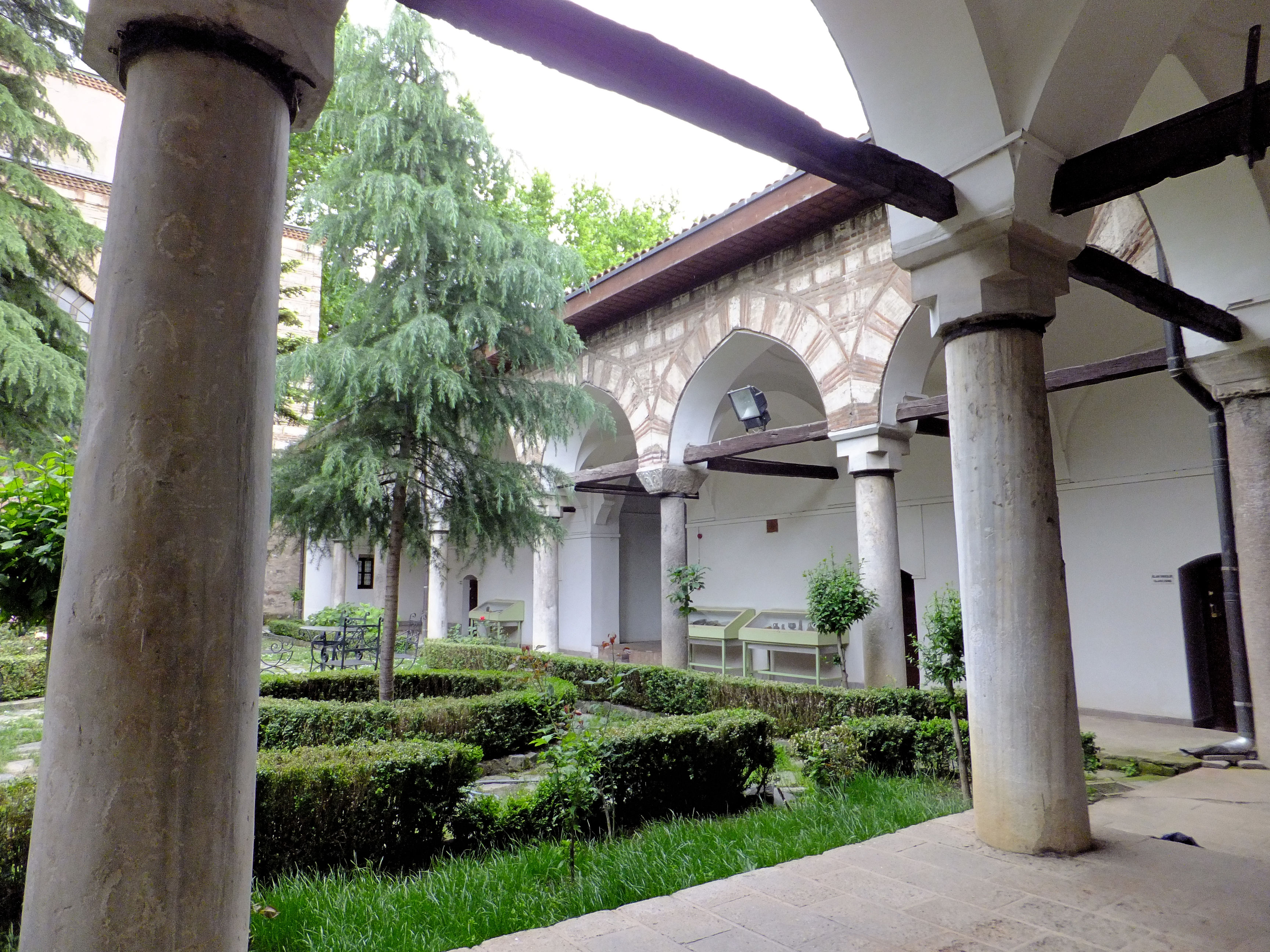
Interior courtyard of the madrasa of the Green Mosque complex

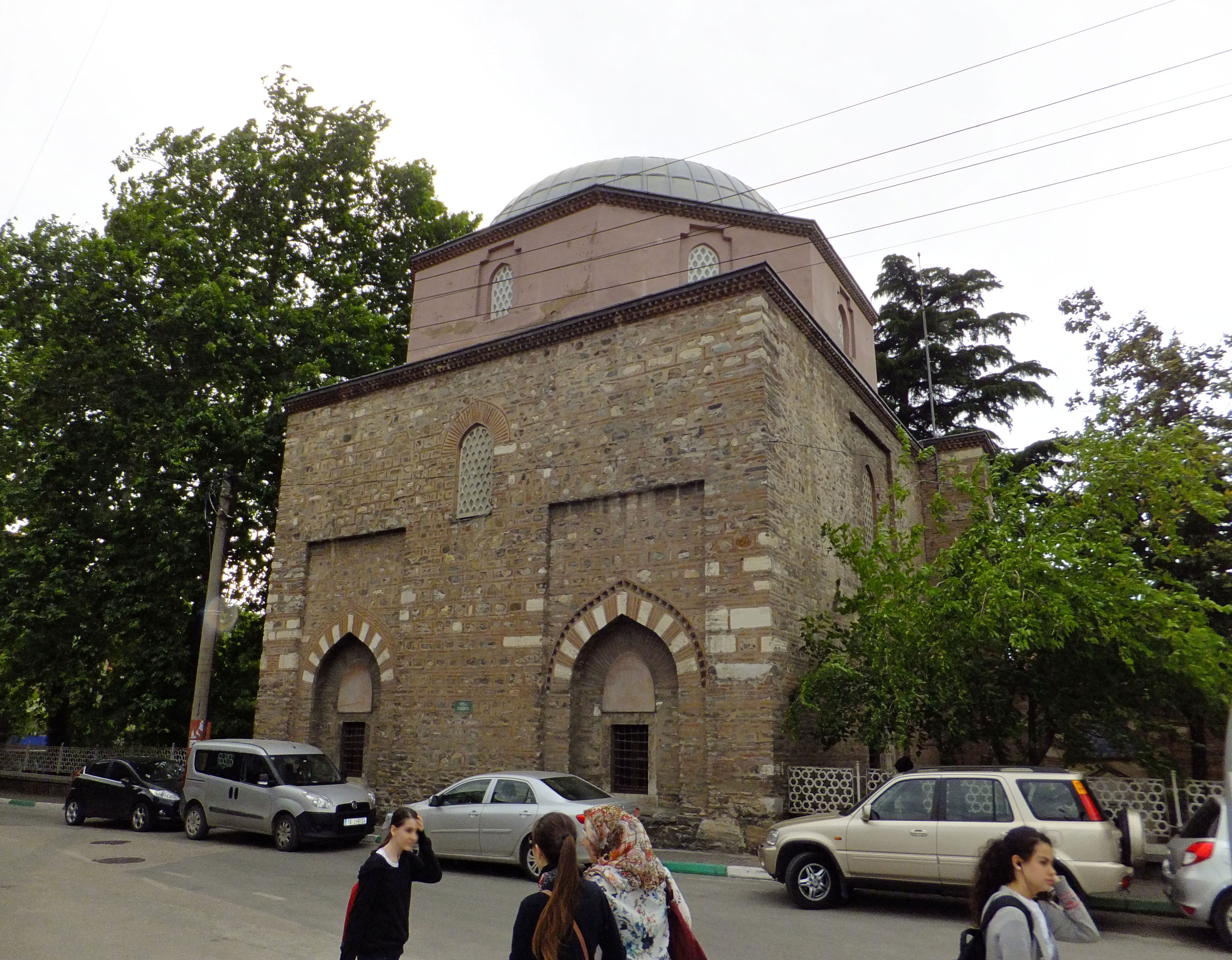
Exterior view of the dershane of the madrasa of the Green Mosque complex

=== Hammams ===
The Ottoman hammam (public baths, spelled as hamam in Turkish) was related to other hammams of the Muslim world and, like them, was descended from the Roman baths and early Byzantine baths. It often featured as part of a külliye and, much like a mosque, it was considered an essential feature of Islamic cities. The form and style of hammams in later Ottoman periods was not much different from that of the early period. The design principles remained the same and, within this design framework, a diversity of spatial configurations can be found in most periods of Ottoman architecture.

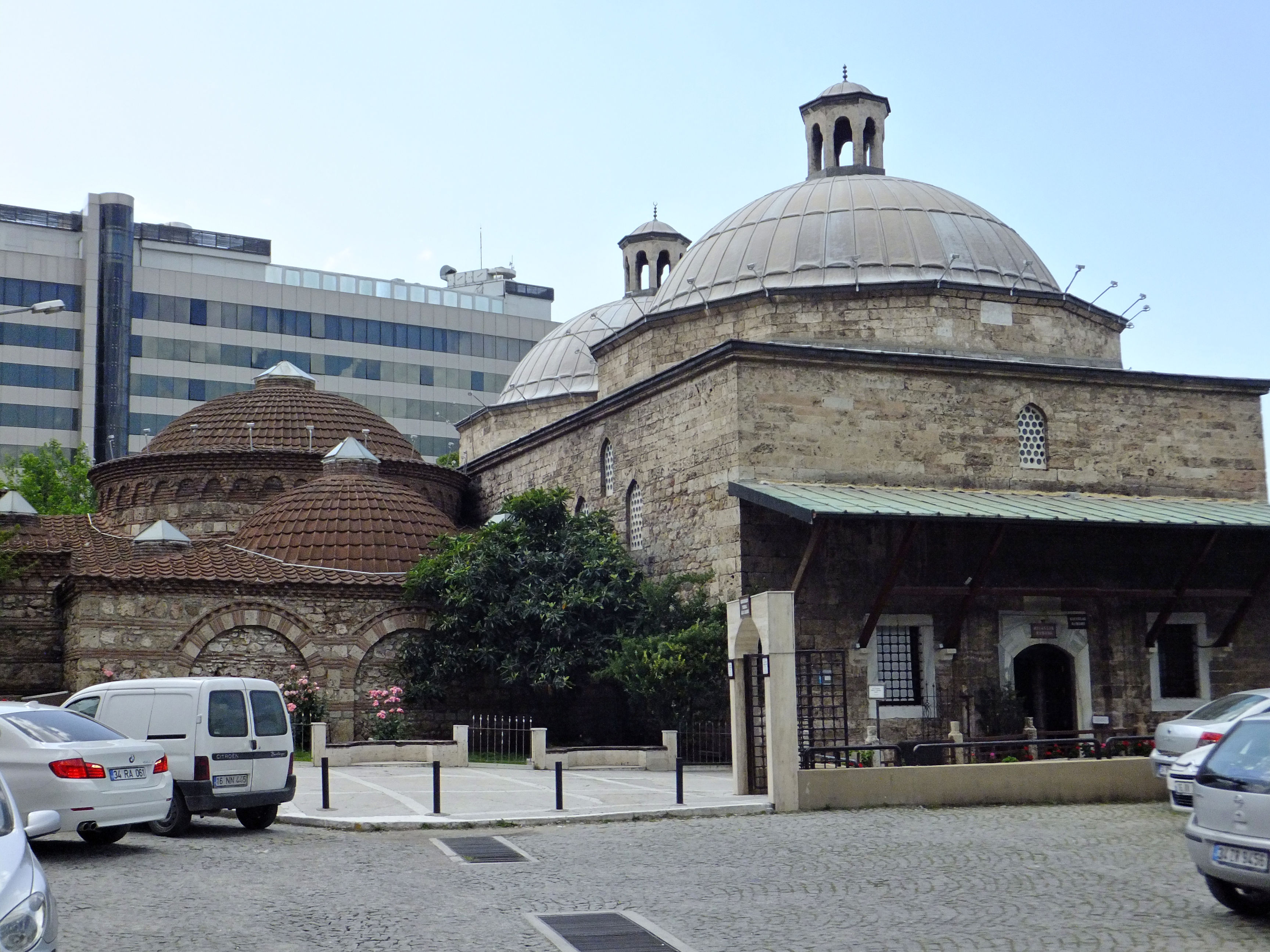
Eski Kaplıca, a bathhouse built at a thermal spring in Bursa; the tiled structure on the left dates from Murad I (r. 1360–1389), while the lead-roof structure on the right dates from Bayezid II (r. 1481–1512)

Hammams traditionally consisted of a regular sequence of rooms which bathers visited in the same order: the changing room or undressing room (corresponding to the Roman apodyterium), the cold room (like the Roman frigidarium), the warm room (like the tepidarium), and the hot room (like the caldarium). In Ottoman baths the cold room (soğukluk) is generally omitted or combined with the changing room (known as the camekân or soyunmalık). This room is often the largest domed chamber in the complex and the transition between the dome and the square chamber is often accomplished with squinches, "Turkish triangles", or decorative muqarnas. This room usually features a central fountain (shadirvan) and is ringed with wooden galleries. In Ottoman baths the warm room (ılıklık) is architecturally de-emphasized and could be little more than a transition space between the changing room and the hot room. The hot room (hararet or sıcaklık) is usually the most elaborate section of the baths. Its layout generally consists of a central domed space flanked by up to four iwans in a symmetrical or cruciform layout. The corners between these iwans are often occupied by smaller domed chambers, halvets, which were used for private bathing. In larger hammams the changing room, warm room, and hot rooms were commonly positioned along a linear axis, but smaller hammams often had more flexible and asymmetrical floor plans. Some hammams were "double" hammams that include separate sections for men and for women, though the women's section was often smaller than the men's. Heat was generated through a hypocaust system, in which hot water flowed through pipes in the walls and under the floors. A few baths in Turkey were built to take advantage of natural hot springs, such as the Eski Kaplıca ("Old Thermal Baths") of Bursa, first built by Murad I (r. 1360–1389).

Due to the humidity of the baths, the lower walls of hammams are generally covered in marble and rarely decorated. However, the domes of early Ottoman hammams were often decorated with carved stucco (plaster), a technique which was common in Islamic architecture. Stucco decoration was found in other Ottoman buildings but it was particularly characteristic of hammams. Plaster was applied to brick constructions on the inside of the dome and in the transitional zone between the dome and the square chamber below. Domes could be decorated with spiral grooves and geometric patterns while the transitional zones could be decorated with muqarnas, Turkish triangles, or similar motifs. An example of this type of decoration can be seen in the Ismail Bey Hamam in Iznik, dating from either the late 14th or early 15th century. The most advanced and relatively well-preserved stucco decoration of this period is found in the hammams built in Edirne during the reign of Murad II (between 1421 and 1451), such as the Gazi Mihal Hamam (1422), the Beylerbeyi Hamam (1429), the Topkapi or Alaca Hamam (1441), and the Yeniçeri Hamam (unspecified date).

Among other pre-1453 examples of Ottoman hammams (in various states of conservation today) are the Orhan Bey Hamam in Bursa (built around 1339 for his religious complex), the Demirtaş Hamam in Bursa (14th century), the Hacı Hamza Hamam in Iznik (late 14th or early 15th century), the Çelebi Sultan Mehmet Hamam in Merzifon (1413), the Mahkeme Hamam in Bursa (1421), the Emir Sultan Hamam in Bursa (1426), the Karacabey Hamam in Ankara (1444), and the Bey Hamam In Thessaloniki (1444), along with many others of varying importance. After the 1453 conquest of Constantinople, most hammams in the new capital city were designed as part of larger külliye and mosque complexes.

Early Ottoman hammams

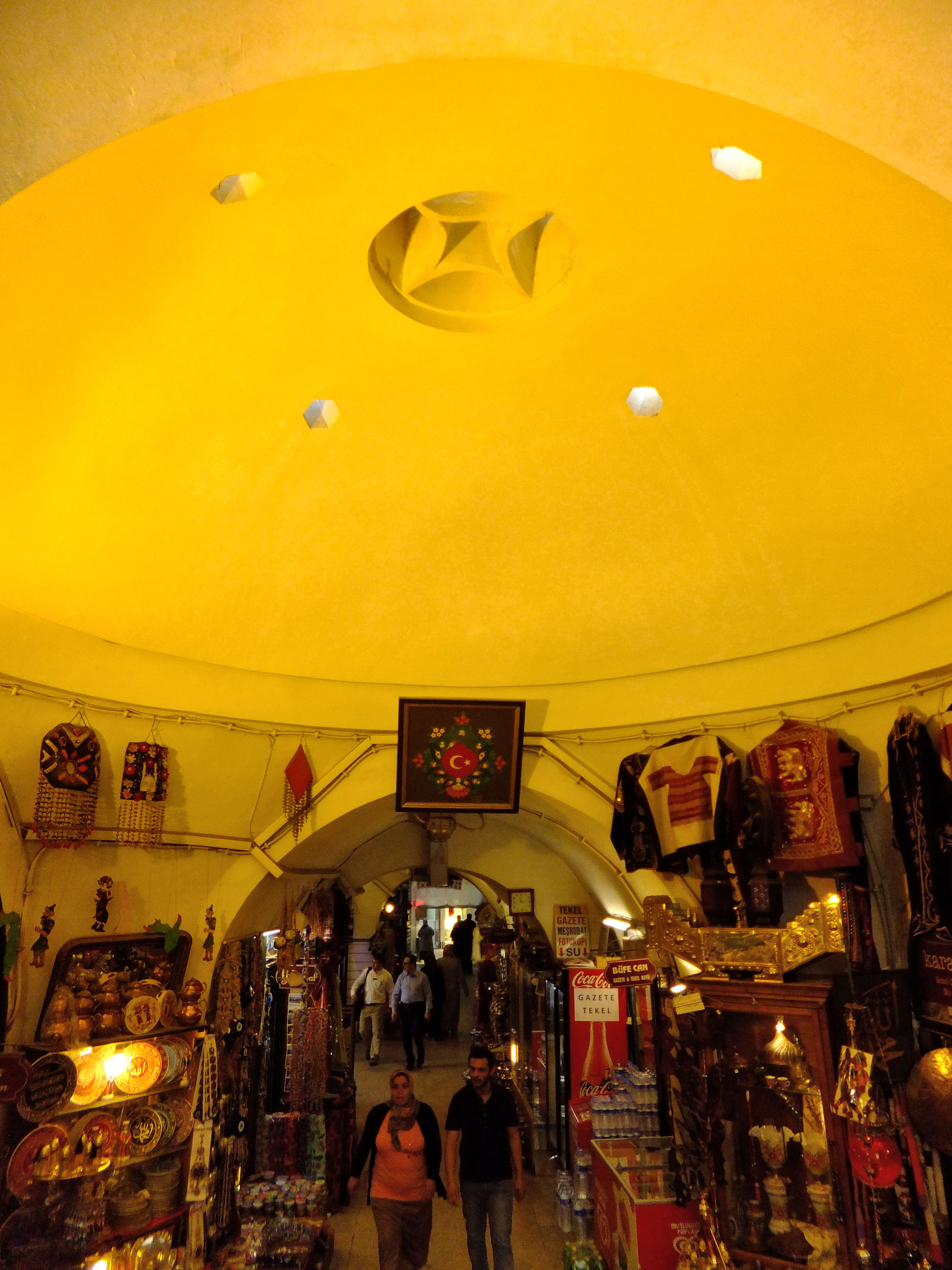
Interior of the Orhan Bey Hamam in Bursa (c. 1339), currently used as a market (the Eski Aynalı Çarşı)

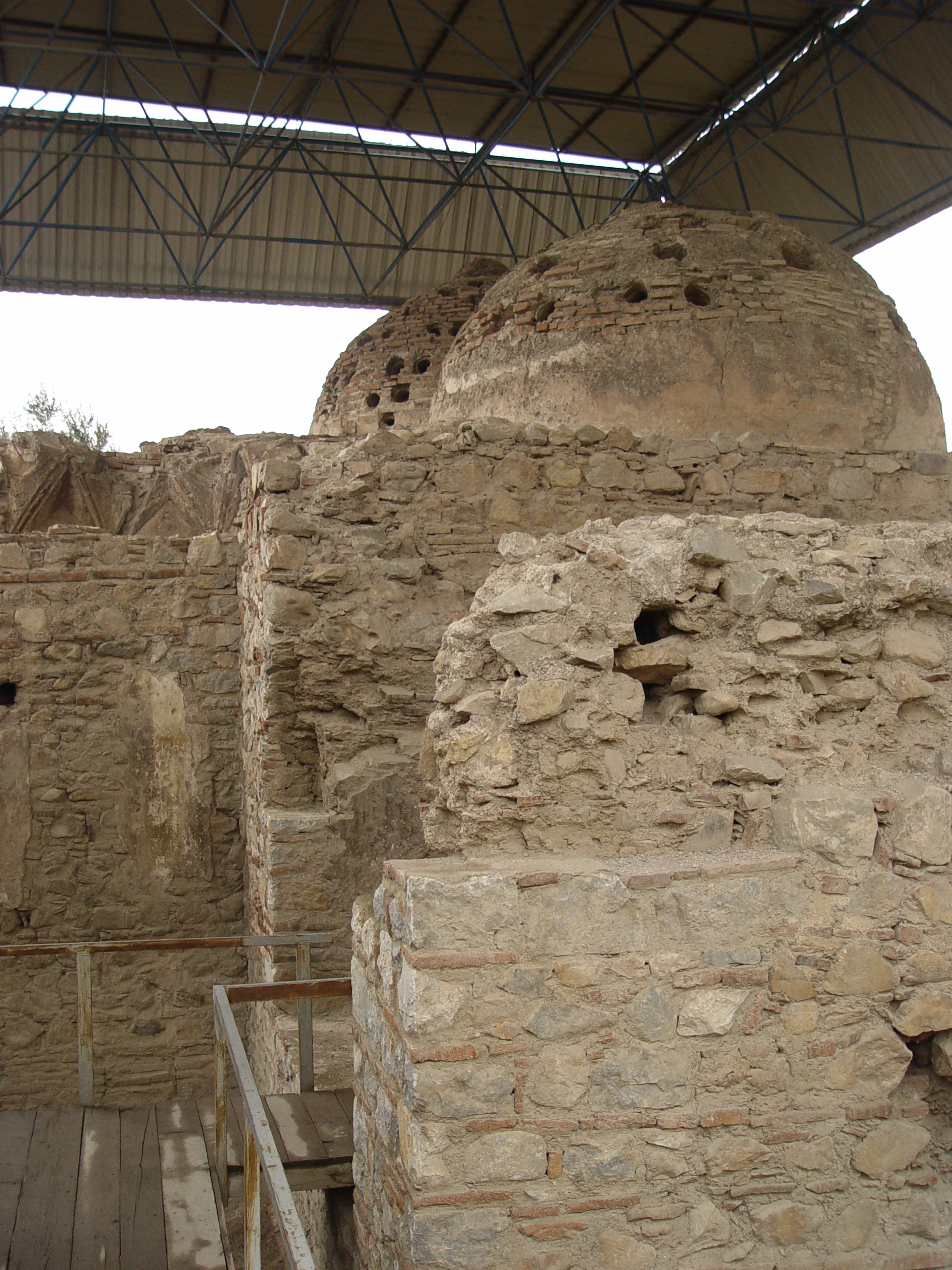
Remains of the Ismail Bey Hamam in Iznik (late 14th or early 15th century)

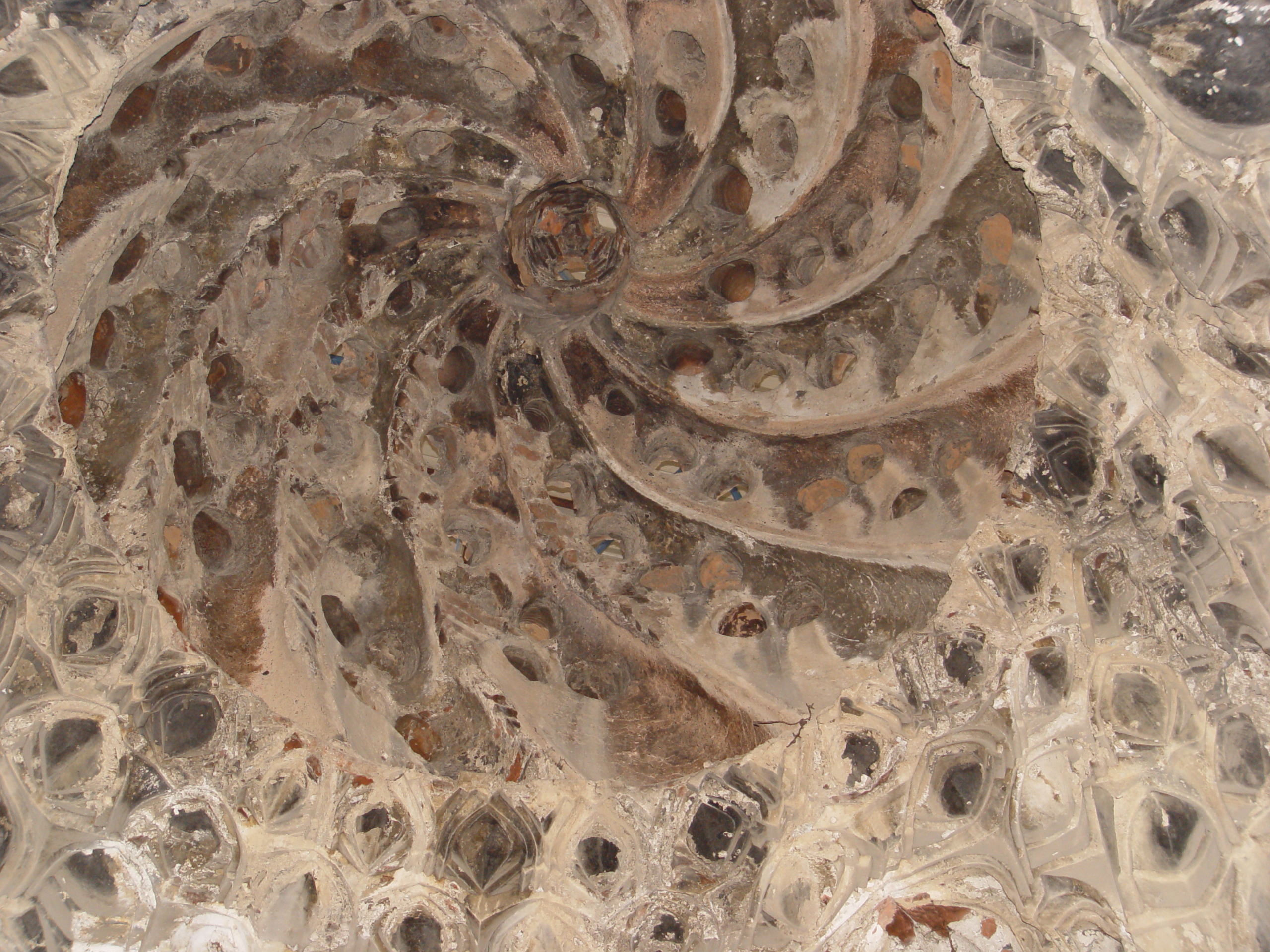
Interior stucco decoration of a domed chamber in the Ismail Bey Hamam

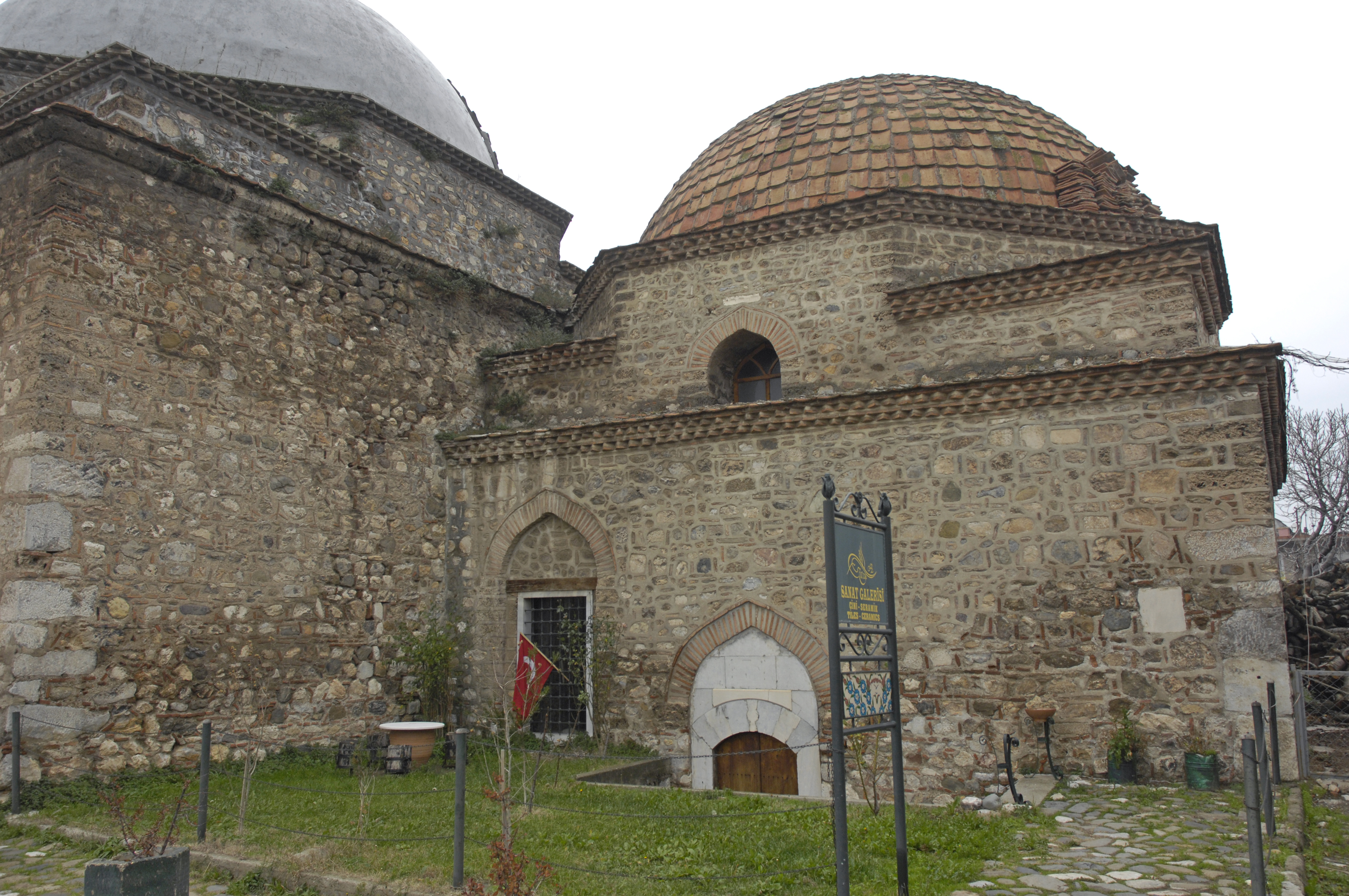
Hacı Hamza Hamam in Iznik (late 14th or early 15th century)

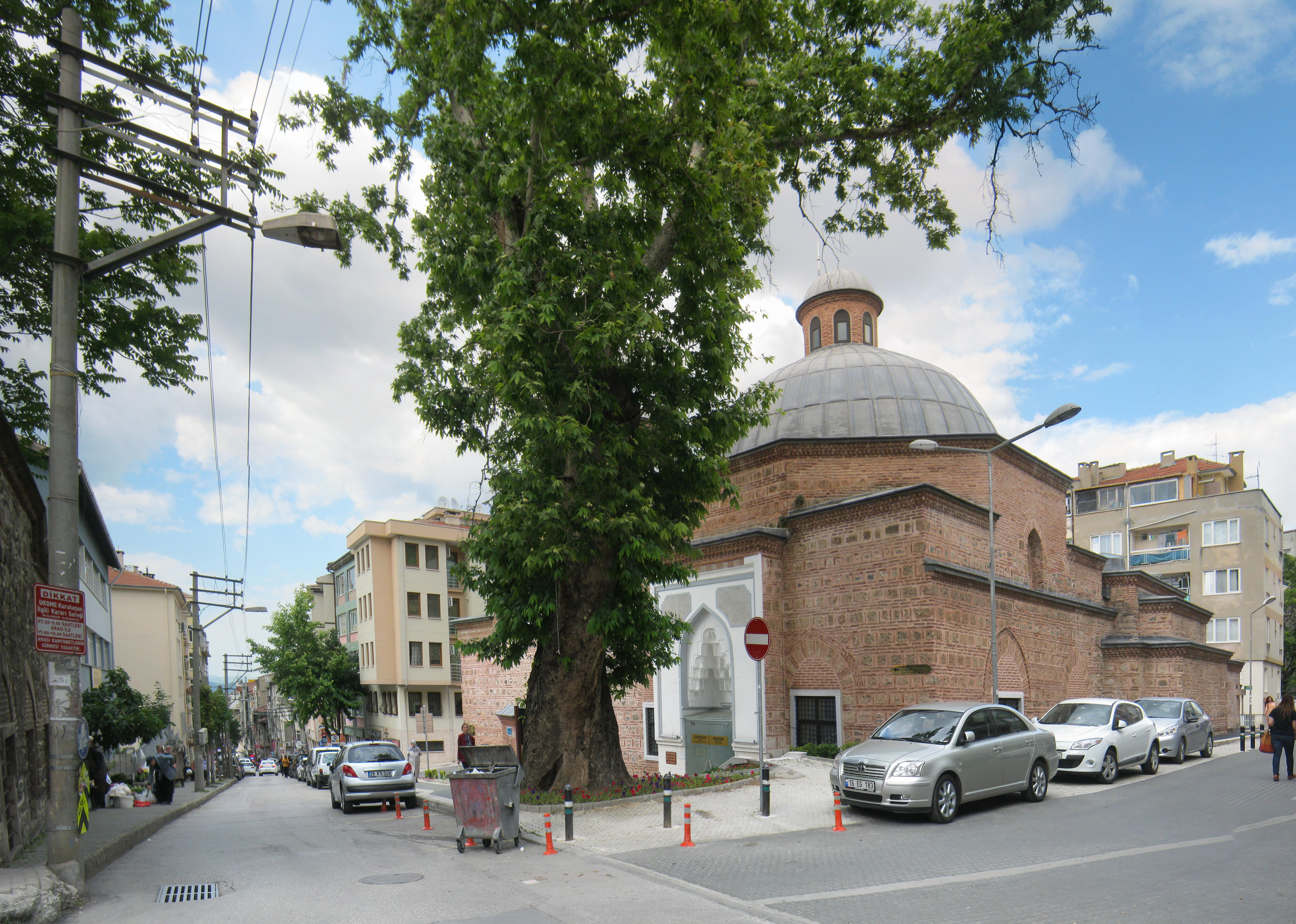
Mahkeme (Ibrahim Pasha) Hamam in Bursa (1421) (on the left)

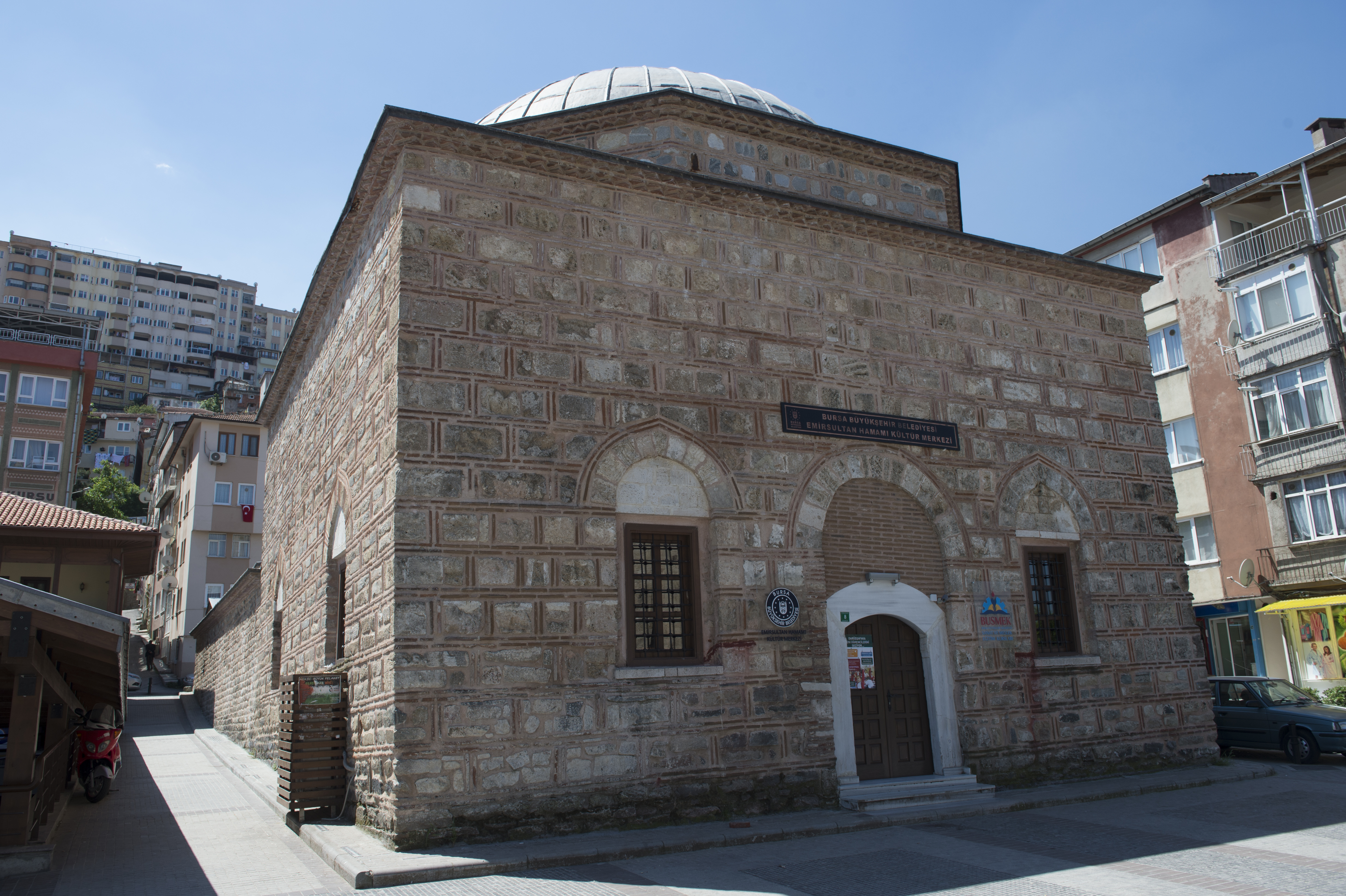
Emir Sultan Hamam in Bursa (1426)

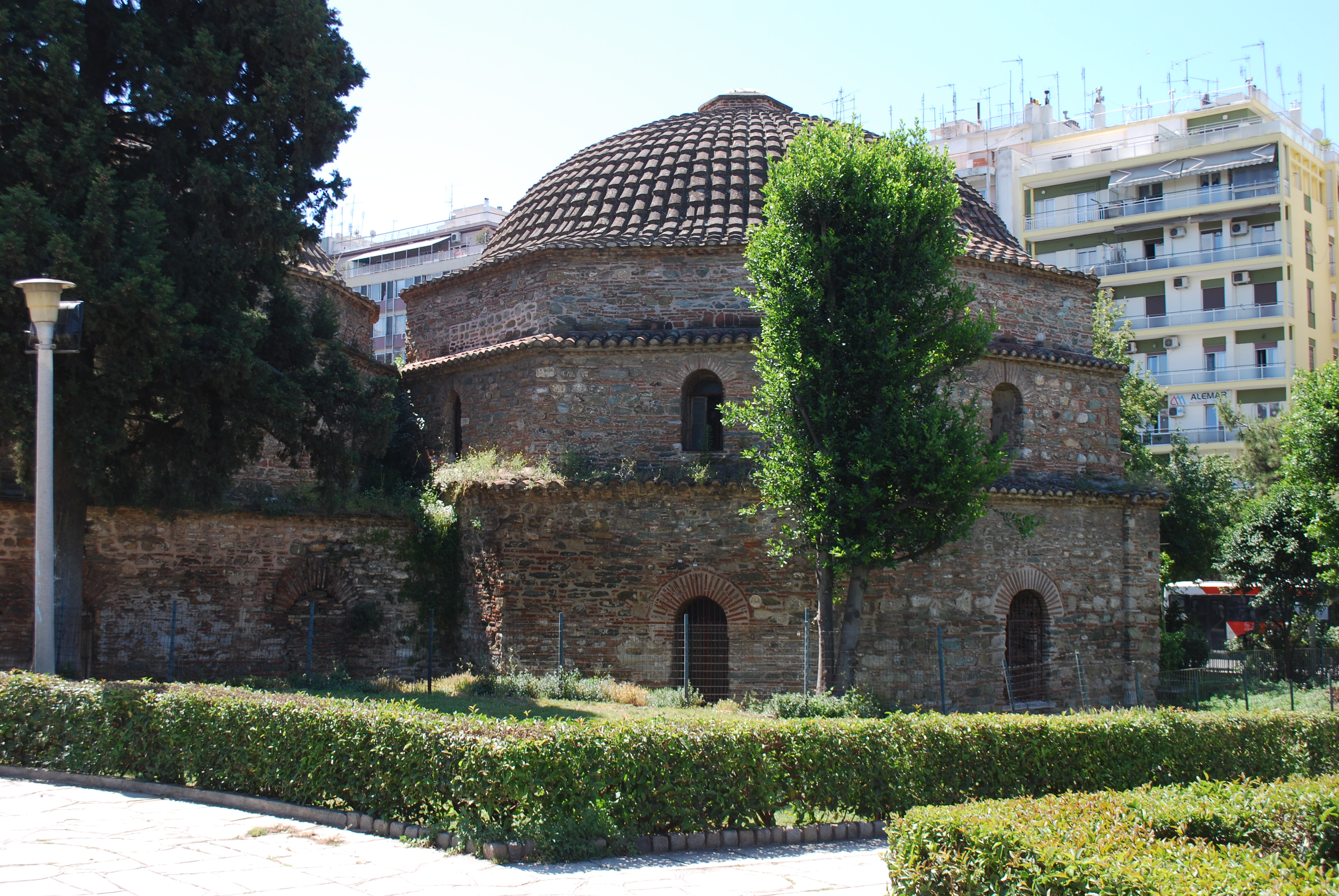
Bey Hamam in Thessaloniki (1444)

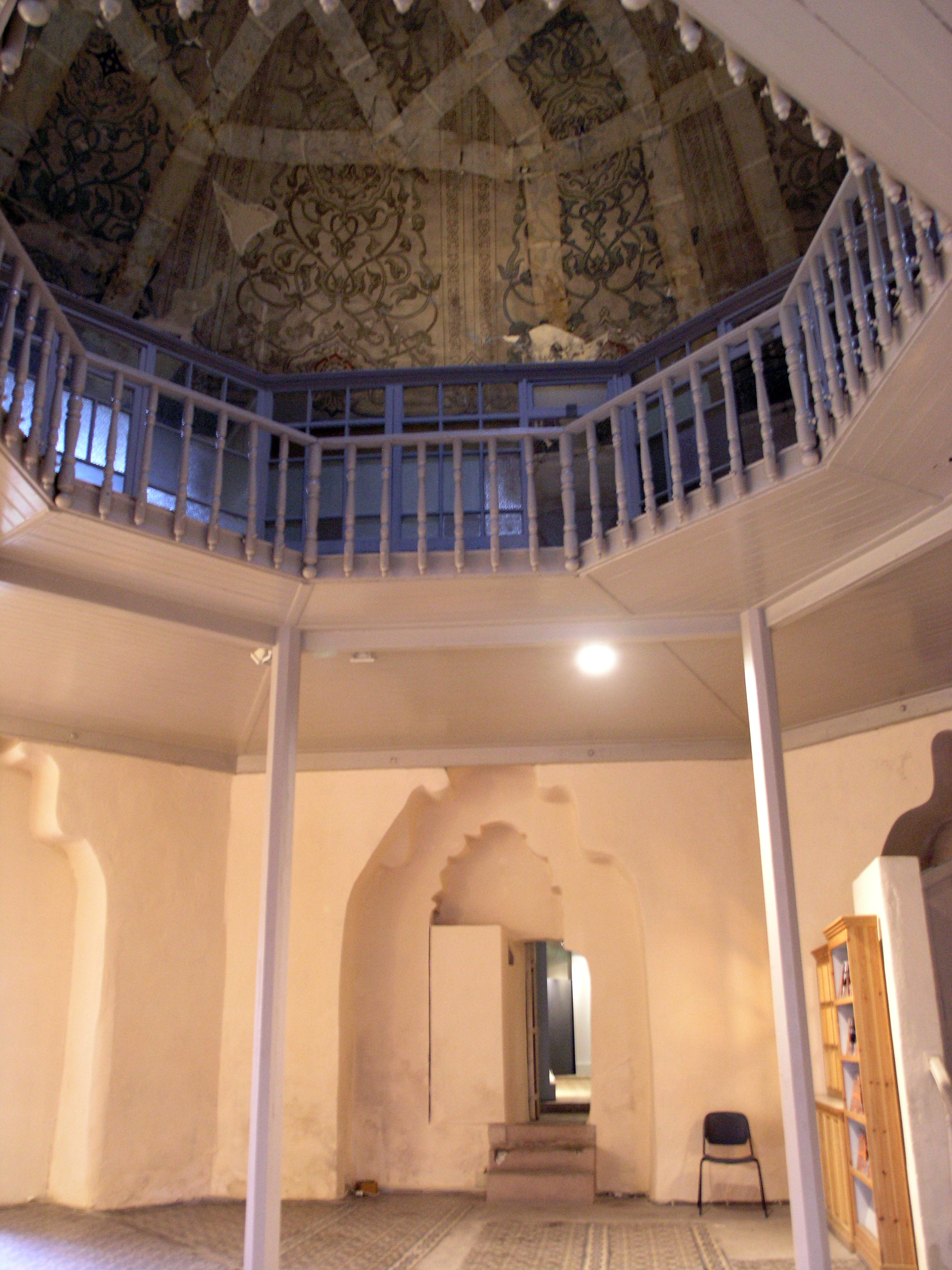
Bey Hamam: changing room

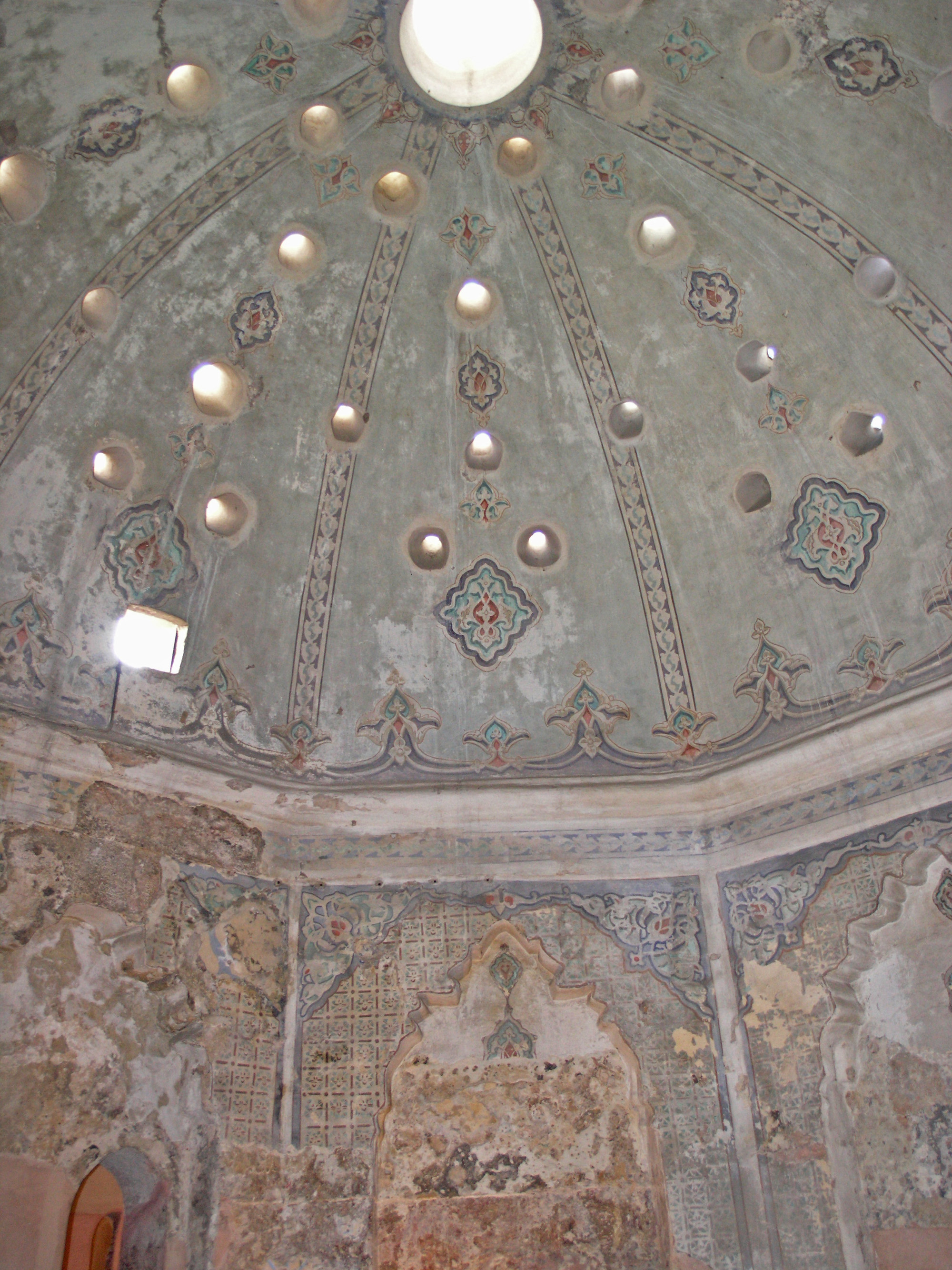
Bey Hamam: warm room

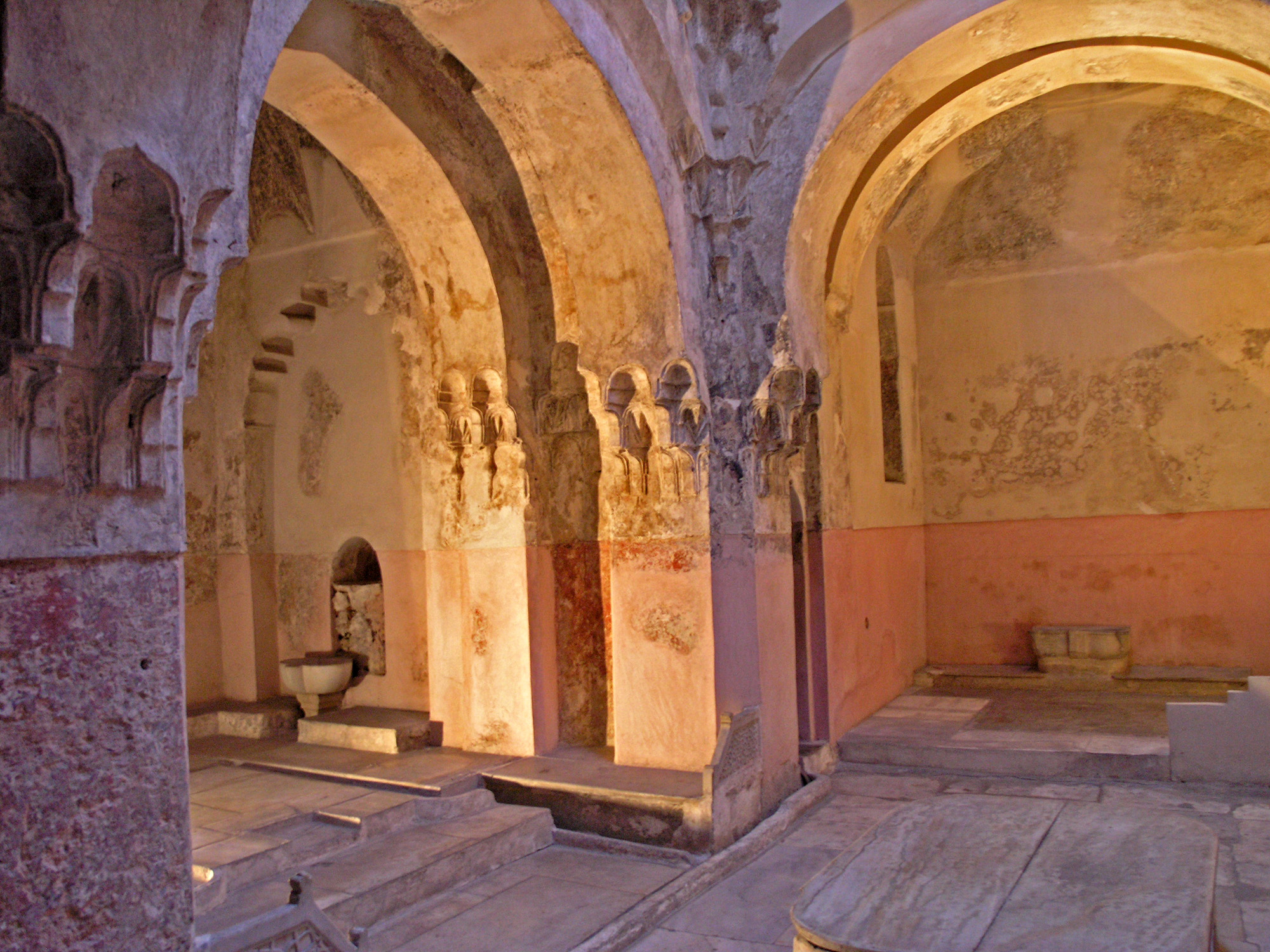
Bey Hamam: hot room

== The reign of Murad II ==
=== Complexes of Murad II's reign ===
The reign of Murad II (between 1421 and 1451, with interruption) saw the continuation of some traditions and the introduction of new innovations. Although the capital was at Edirne, Murad II had his funerary complex (the Muradiye Complex) built in Bursa between 1424 and 1426. It included a mosque (heavily restored in the 19th century), a madrasa, an imaret, and a mausoleum. Its cemetery developed into a royal necropolis when later mausoleums were built here, although Murad II was the only sultan buried here. Murad II's mausoleum is unique among royal Ottoman tombs as its central dome has an opening to the sky and his son's mausoleum was built directly adjacent to it, as per the sultan's last wishes. The madrasa of the complex is one of the most architecturally accomplished of this period and one of the few of its kind from this period to survive. It is very similar in form to the madrasa of the earlier Green Mosque complex. It has a square courtyard with a central fountain (shadirvan) surrounded by a domed portico, behind which are vaulted rooms. On the southeast side of the courtyard is a large domed classroom (dershane), whose entrance façade (facing the courtyard) features some tile decoration. In Edirne Murad II built another zaviye for Sufis in 1435, now known as the Murad II Mosque. It repeats the Bursa-type plan and also features rich tile decoration similar to the Green Mosque in Bursa, as well as new blue-and-white tiles with Chinese influences. Murad II also began the construction of palace structures on the site of the current Edirne Palace, but none of them have been preserved and it was his successor Mehmed II who is the real founder of the palace.

In addition to his works in Edirne, Murad II also undertook construction and restoration work across Rumelia (the Balkan provinces). As mentioned above, he built the Great Mosque in Plovdiv, a town which became a major provincial center in this part of the empire. Multiple other Ottoman public buildings were built here in the subsequent years under Şihabeddin Paşa and other governors, though many have not been survived to the present day. Murad II also built the Muradiye Imaret/Mosque (also known as the Hünkar Mosque) in Skopje (Üsküb) in 1436–1437; however, the mosque was rebuilt in the 16th and 18th centuries and its original appearance is uncertain. In 1443–1444 Murad II built the Uzunköprü Bridge, a long stone bridge accompanied by a mosque complex, on the road between Istanbul and Edirne. Soon after the sultan's foundation in Skopje, the governor Ishak Bey sponsored his own zaviye complex in the same city, completed in 1438–1439. The zaviye, with a T-plan layout, was renovated and converted to a mosque in 1519. The complex has since lost some of its other structures but still retains Ishak Bey's tomb, a small hexagonal domed structure with tile decoration along the drum of the dome.

Complexes of Murad II's reign

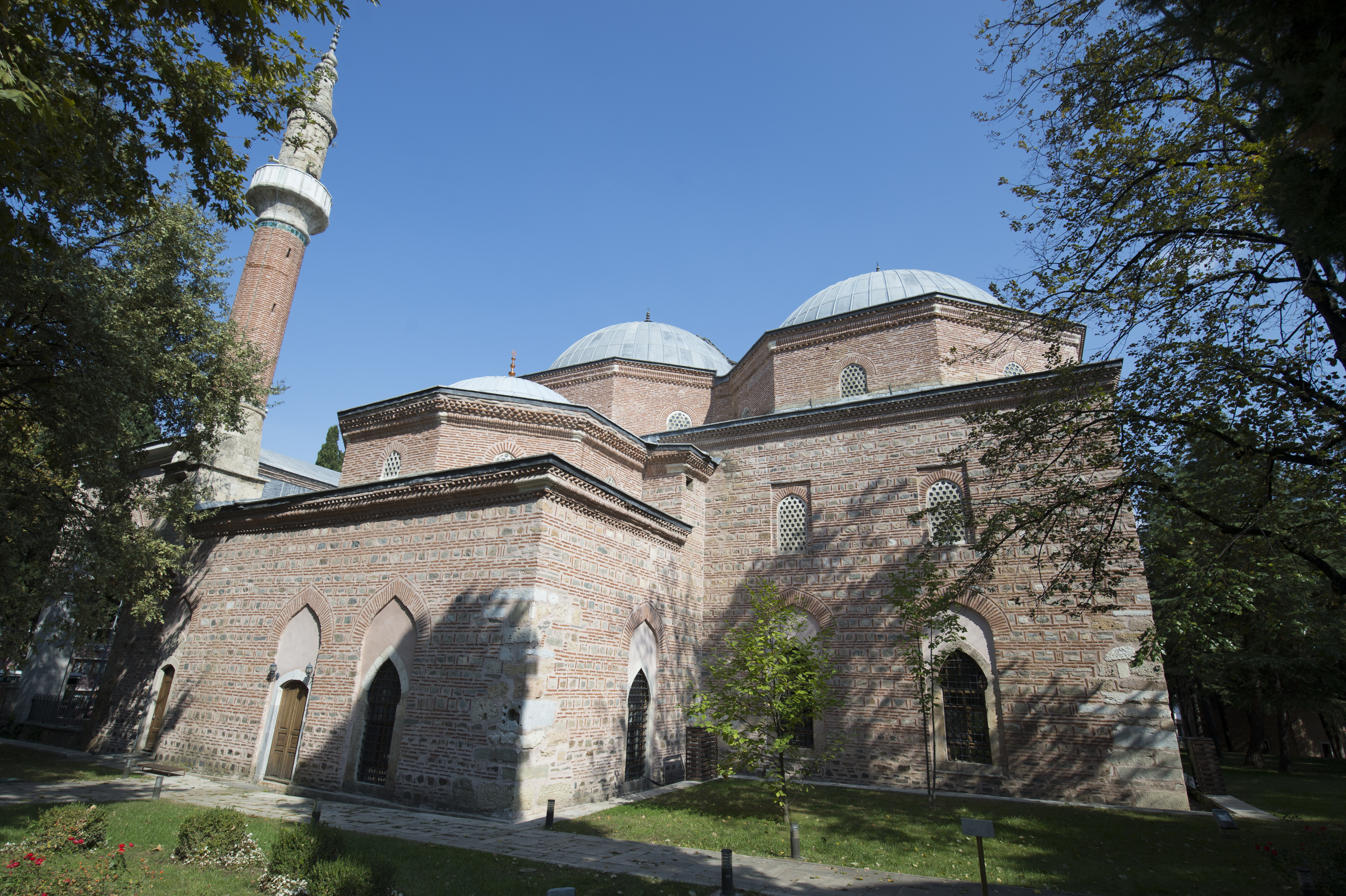
Mosque of the Murad II Complex in Bursa (completed in 1426, reconstructed in the 19th century)

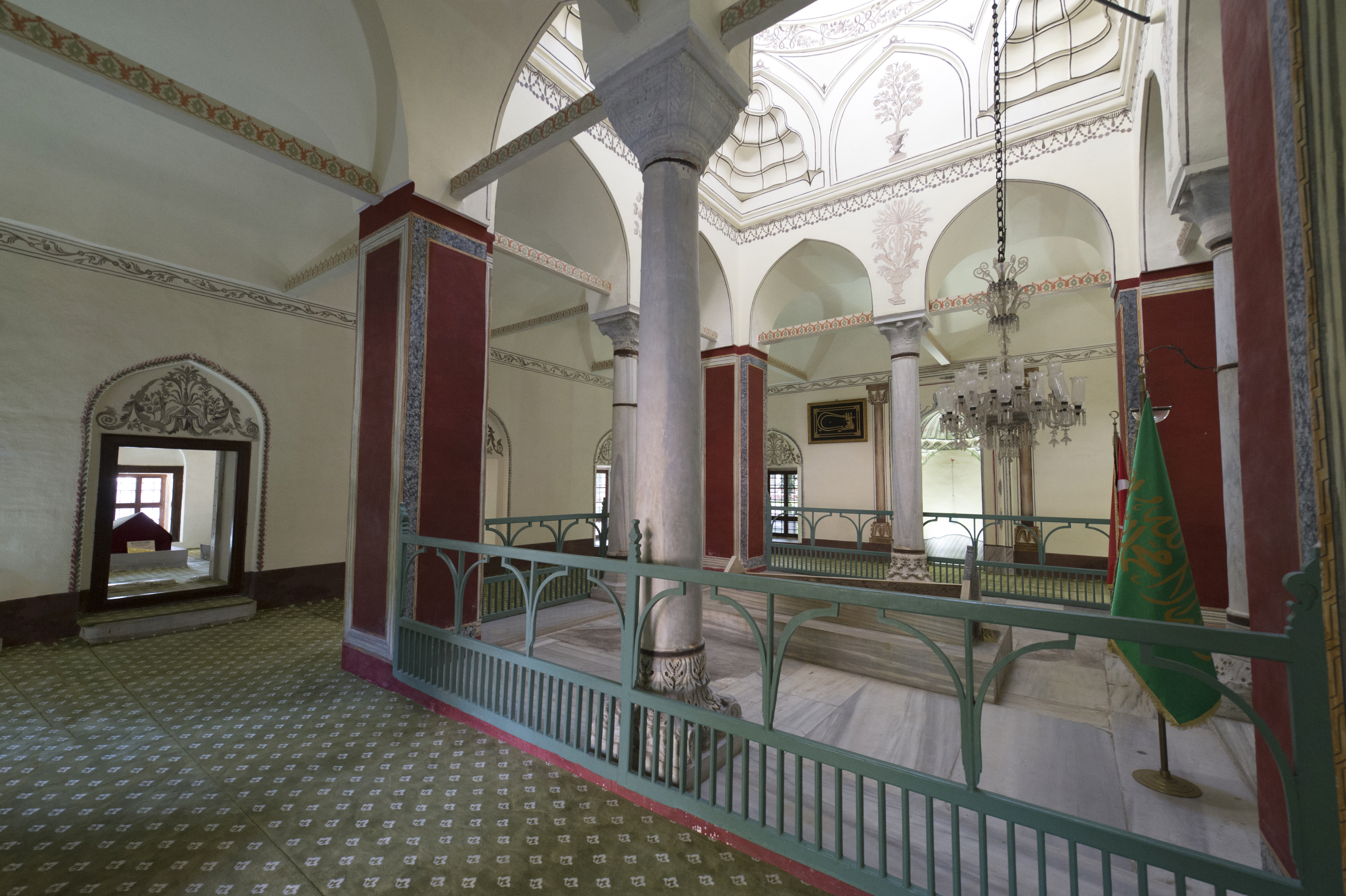
Tomb of Murad II at the Murad II Complex in Bursa (circa 1426)

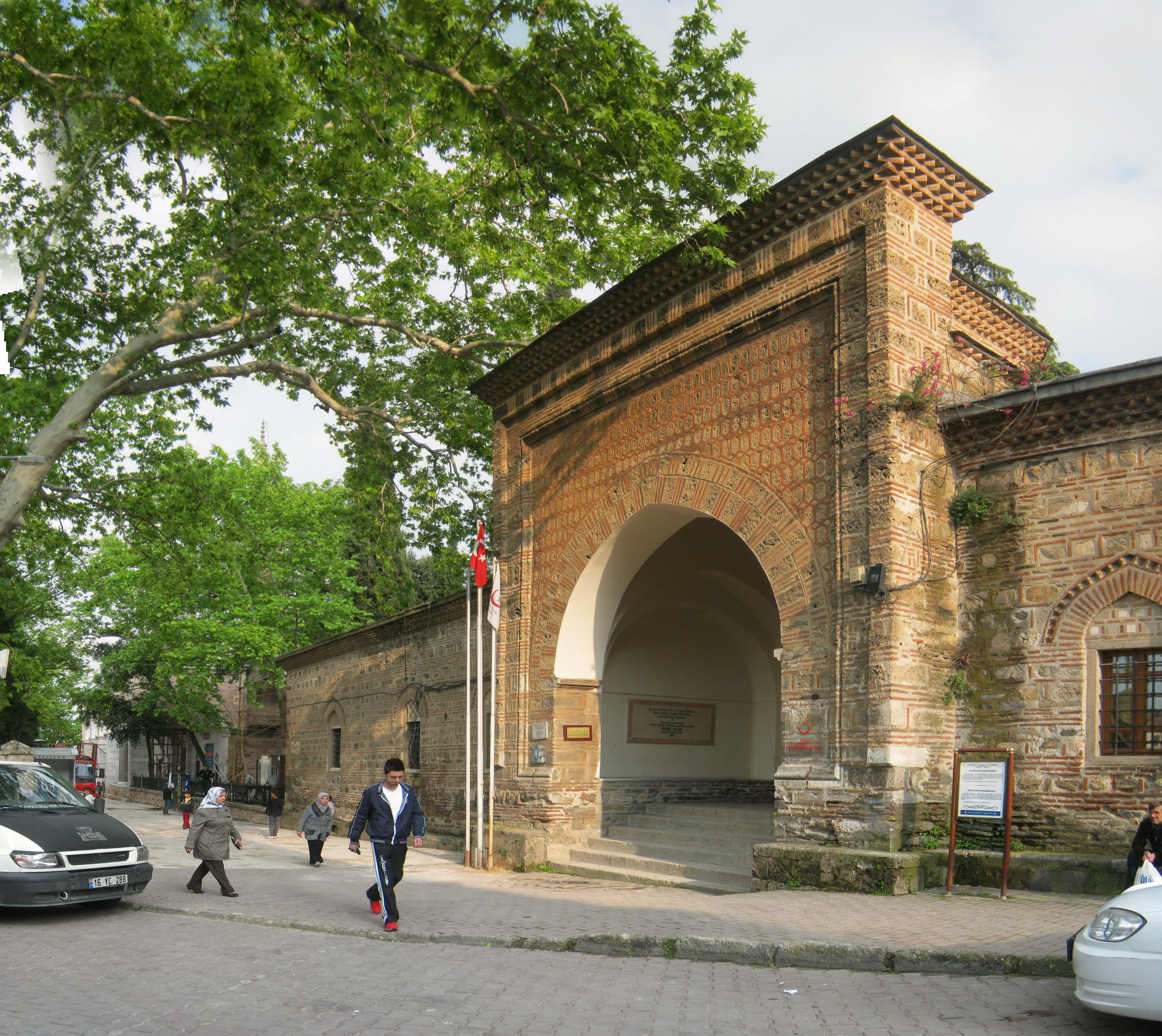
Entrance to the Murad II Medrese in Bursa (circa 1426)

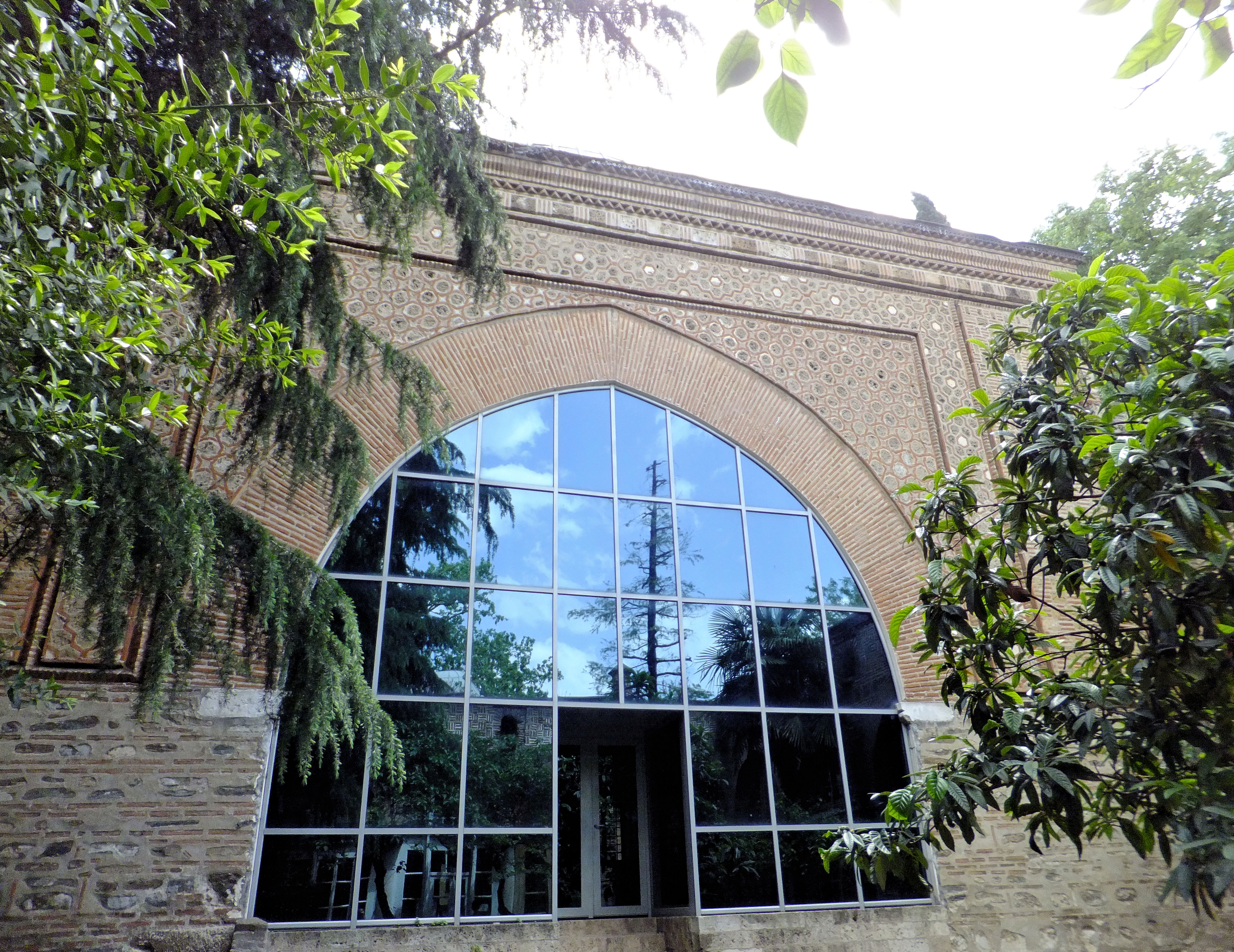
Entrance façade of the dershane (classroom) of the Murad II Medrese (with modern glass added)

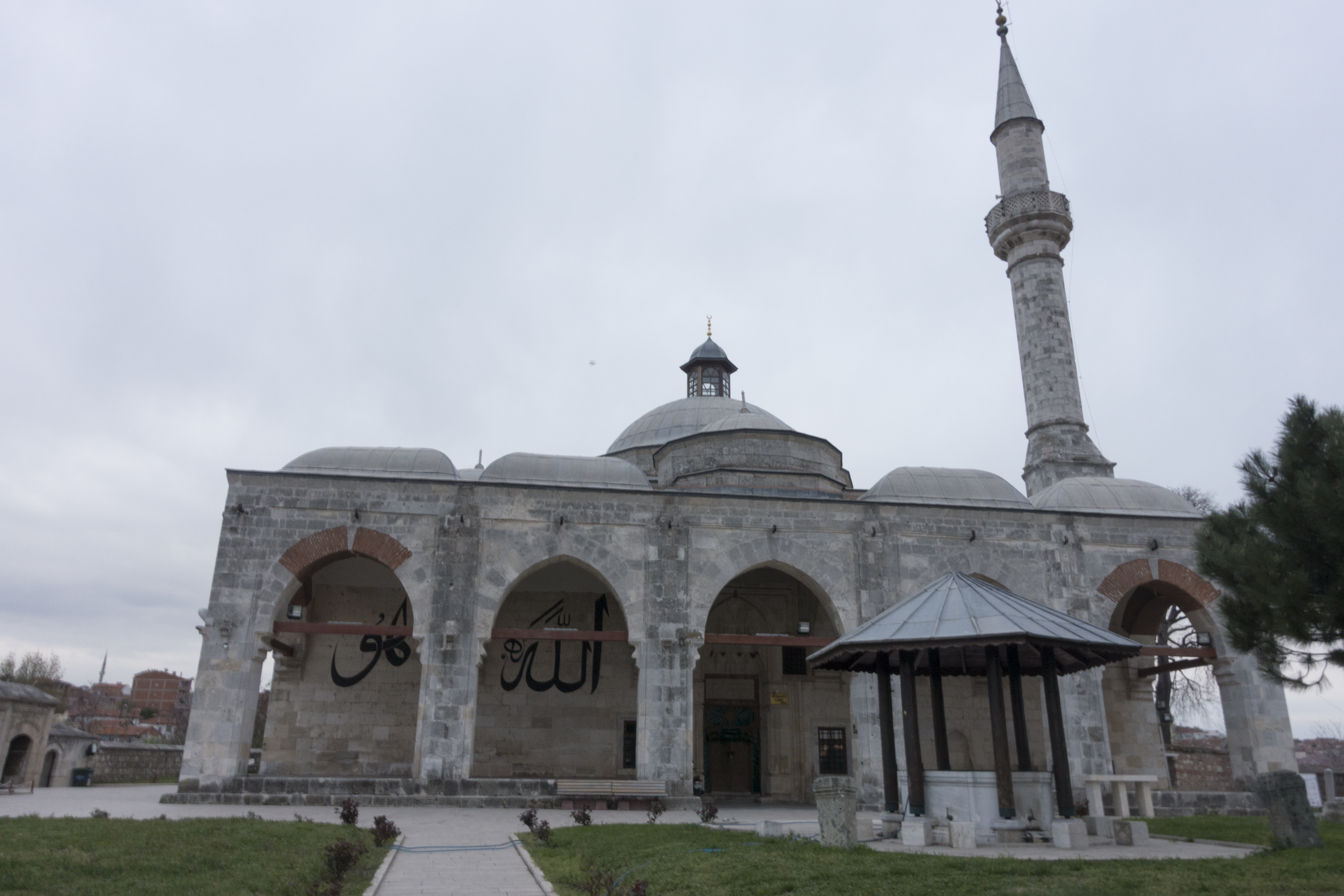
Murad II Mosque in Edirne (circa 1435)

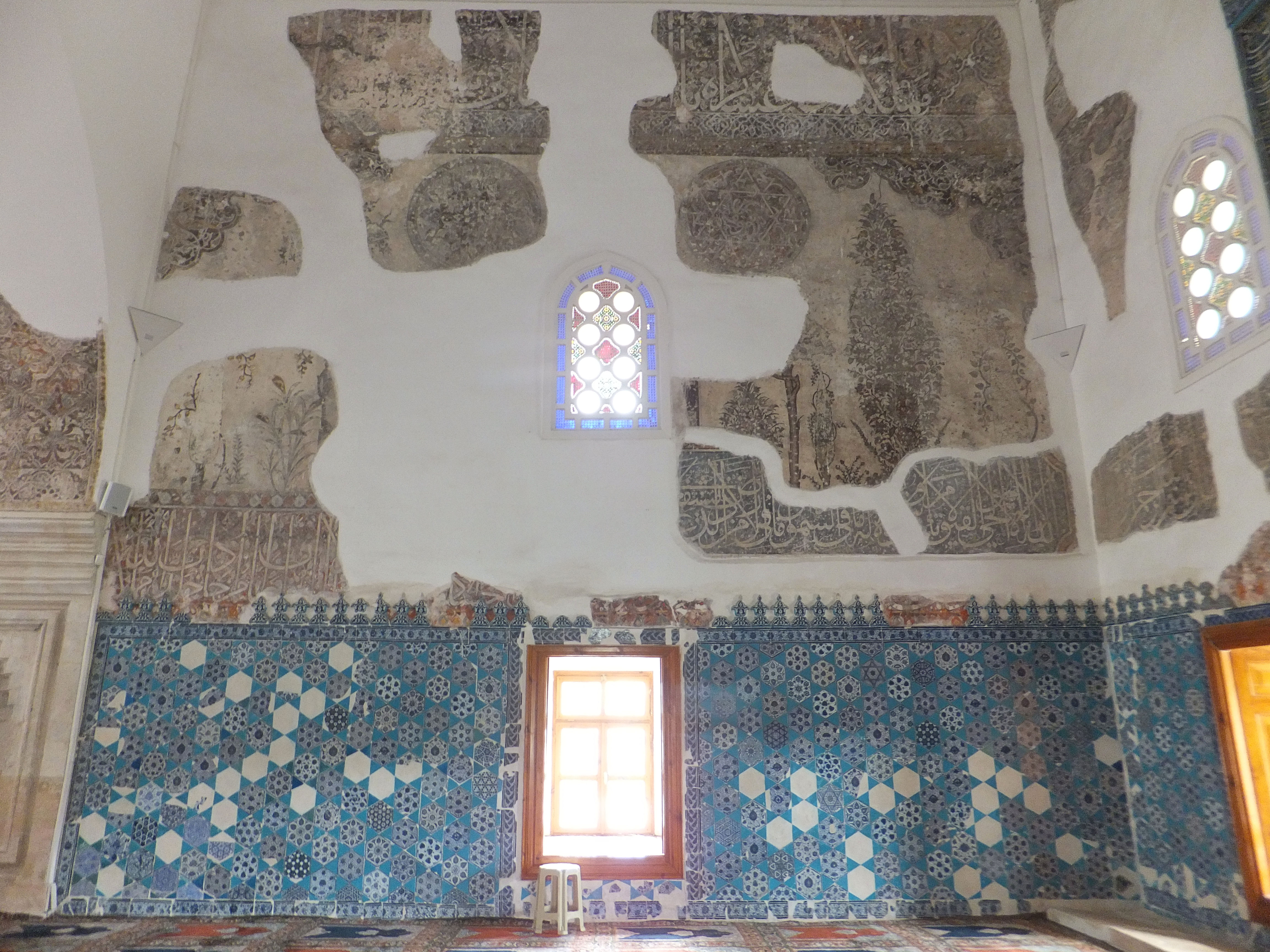
Remains of tile and fresco decoration inside the Murad II Mosque in Edirne

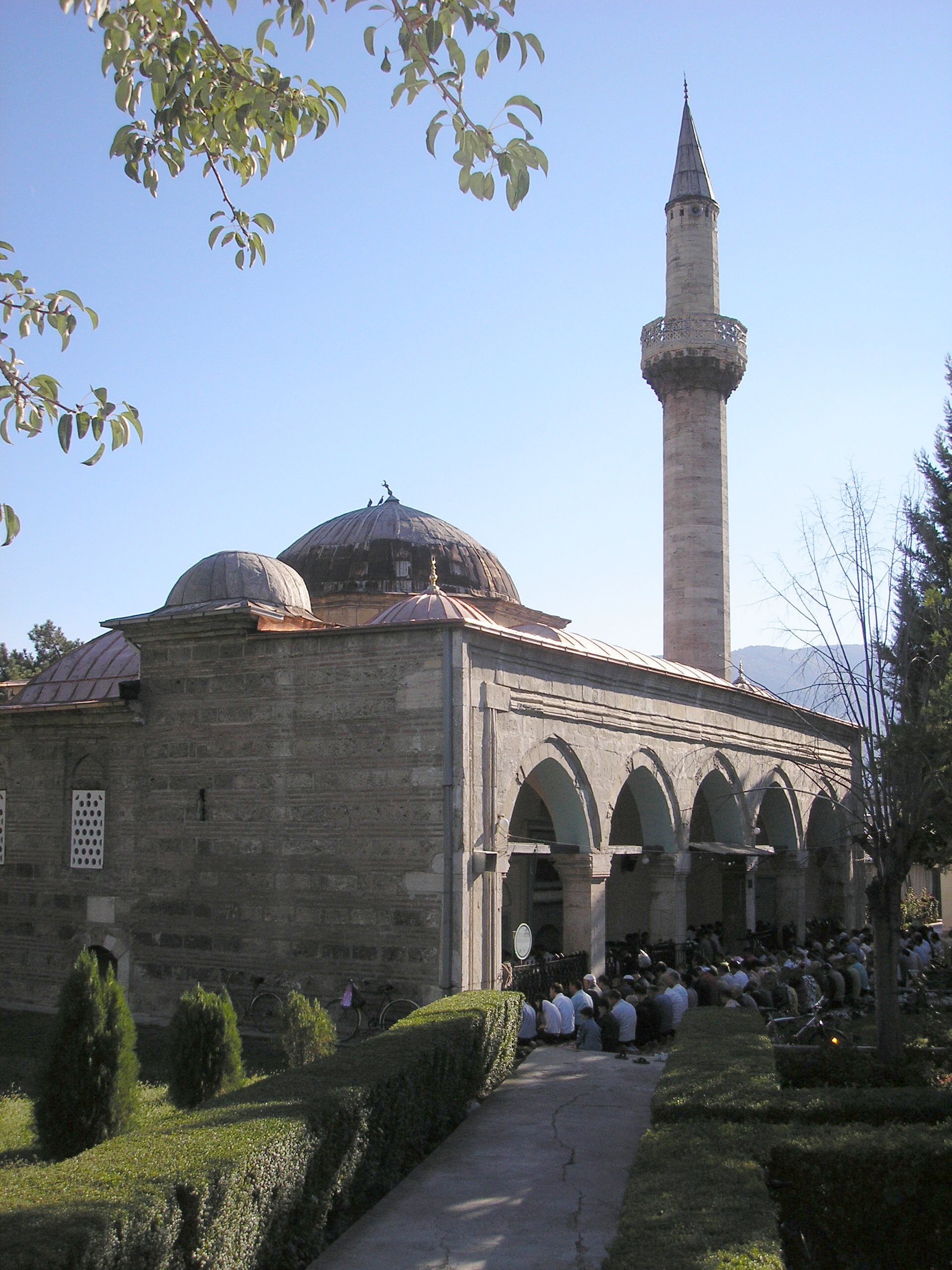
Ishak Bey Mosque in Skopje (1438–1439)

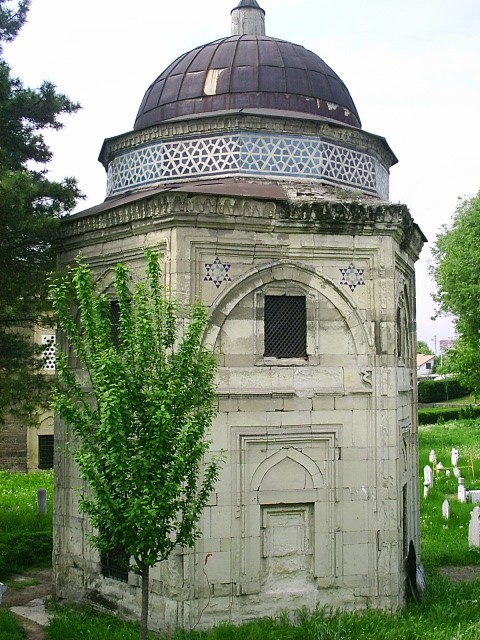
Tomb of Ishak Bey, next to the Ishak Bey Mosque (circa 1439)

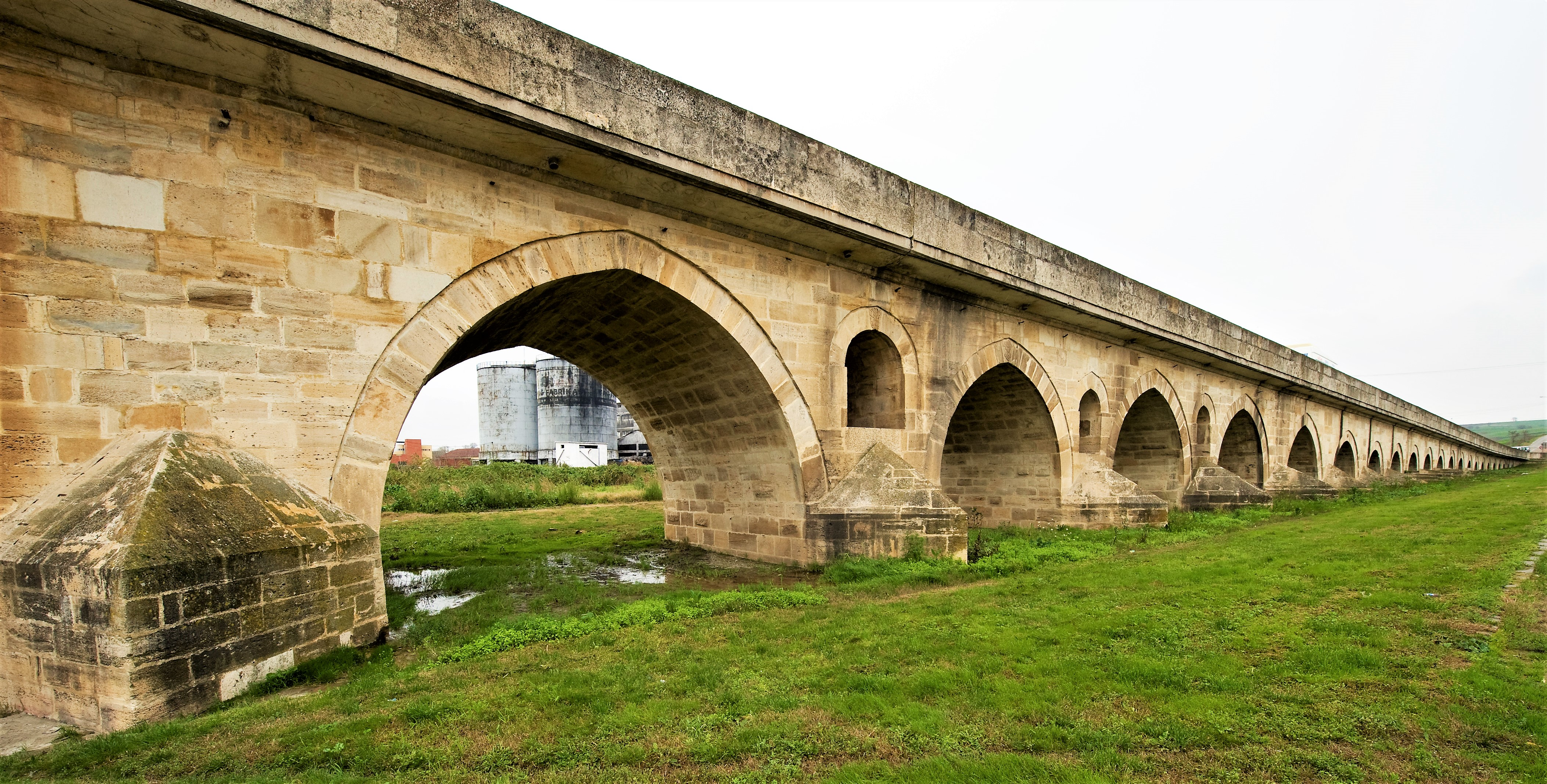
Uzunköprü Bridge in Uzunköprü (1443–1444)

=== The Üç Şerefeli Mosque ===
The most important mosque of this period is the Üç Şerefeli Mosque, begun by Murad II in 1437 and finished in 1447. It has a very different design from earlier mosques. The floor plan is nearly square but is divided between a rectangular courtyard and a rectangular prayer hall. The courtyard has a central fountain and is surrounded by a portico of arches and domes, with a decorated central portal leading into the courtyard from the outside and another one leading from the courtyard into the prayer hall. The prayer hall is centered around a huge dome which covers most of the middle part of the hall, while the sides of the hall are covered by pairs of smaller domes. The central dome, 24 meters in diameter (or 27 meters according to Kuban), is much larger than any other Ottoman dome built before this. On the outside, this results in an early example of the "cascade of domes" visual effect seen in later Ottoman mosques, although the overall arrangement here is described by Sheila Blair and Jonathan Bloom as not yet successful compared to later examples. The mosque has a total of four minarets, arranged around the four corners of the courtyard. Its southwestern minaret was the tallest Ottoman minaret built up to that time and features three balconies, from which the mosque's name derives. The mosque was heavily damaged by an earthquake in 1752 and partly reconstructed.

The overall form of the Üç Şerefeli Mosque, with its central-dome prayer hall, arcaded court with fountain, minarets, and tall entrance portals, foreshadowed the features of later Ottoman mosque architecture. It has been described as a "crossroads of Ottoman architecture", marking the culmination of architectural experimentation with different spatial arrangements during the period of the Beyliks and the early Ottomans. Kuban describes it as the "last stage in Early Ottoman architecture", while the central dome plan and the "modular" character of its design signaled the direction of future Ottoman architecture in Istanbul. He also notes that the mosque, which is built in cut stone and makes use of alternating bands of coloured stone for some of its decorative effects, marks the decline of the use of alternating brick and stone construction seen in earlier Ottoman buildings.

Scholars have tried to suggest various possible sources of influence and inspiration for this design. Godfrey Goodwin suggests that all the elements needed for the design of the Üç Şerefeli Mosque were already present in the existing mosques of western Anatolia, such as the Grand Mosque of Manisa and the Isa Bey Mosque of Selçuk, but that they had simply not been united together in a single design. Blair and Bloom suggest that it is a grander-scale version of the Saruhanid Grand Mosque in Manisa, a city with which Murad II was familiar. Gülru Necipoğlu suggests that the mosque's innovations and its enhanced monumentality took inspiration from the imperial architecture of the Timurids as well as from the Umayyad Mosque of Damascus (whose layout had already inspired the aforementioned mosques of Manisa and Selçuk). Kuban suggests that the mosque's spatial design evolved from the importance of the domed space commonly found in front of the mihrab in early Islamic architecture, as well as from the influence of earlier single-domed Ottoman mosques.

Üç Şerefeli Mosque in Edirne

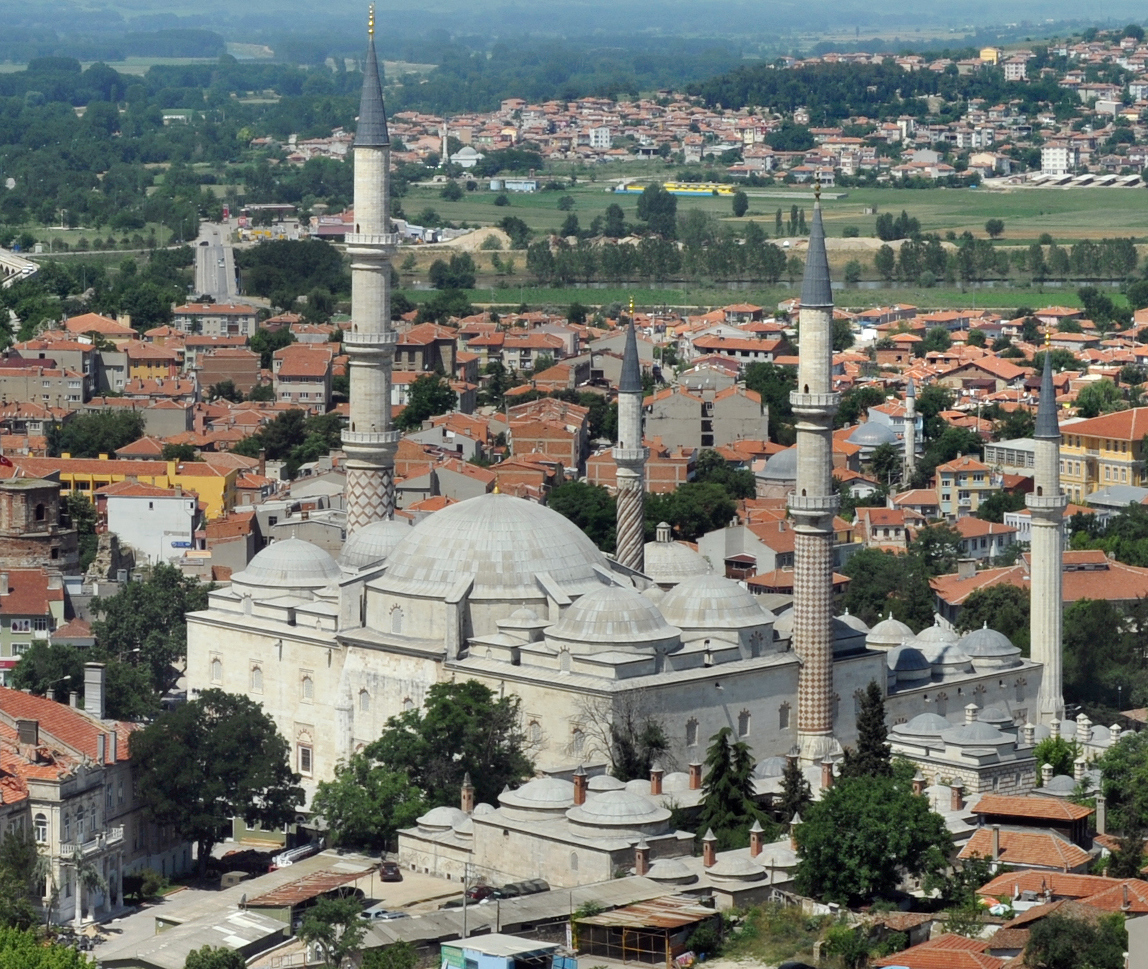
Üç Şerefeli Mosque in Edirne (1437–1447): exterior

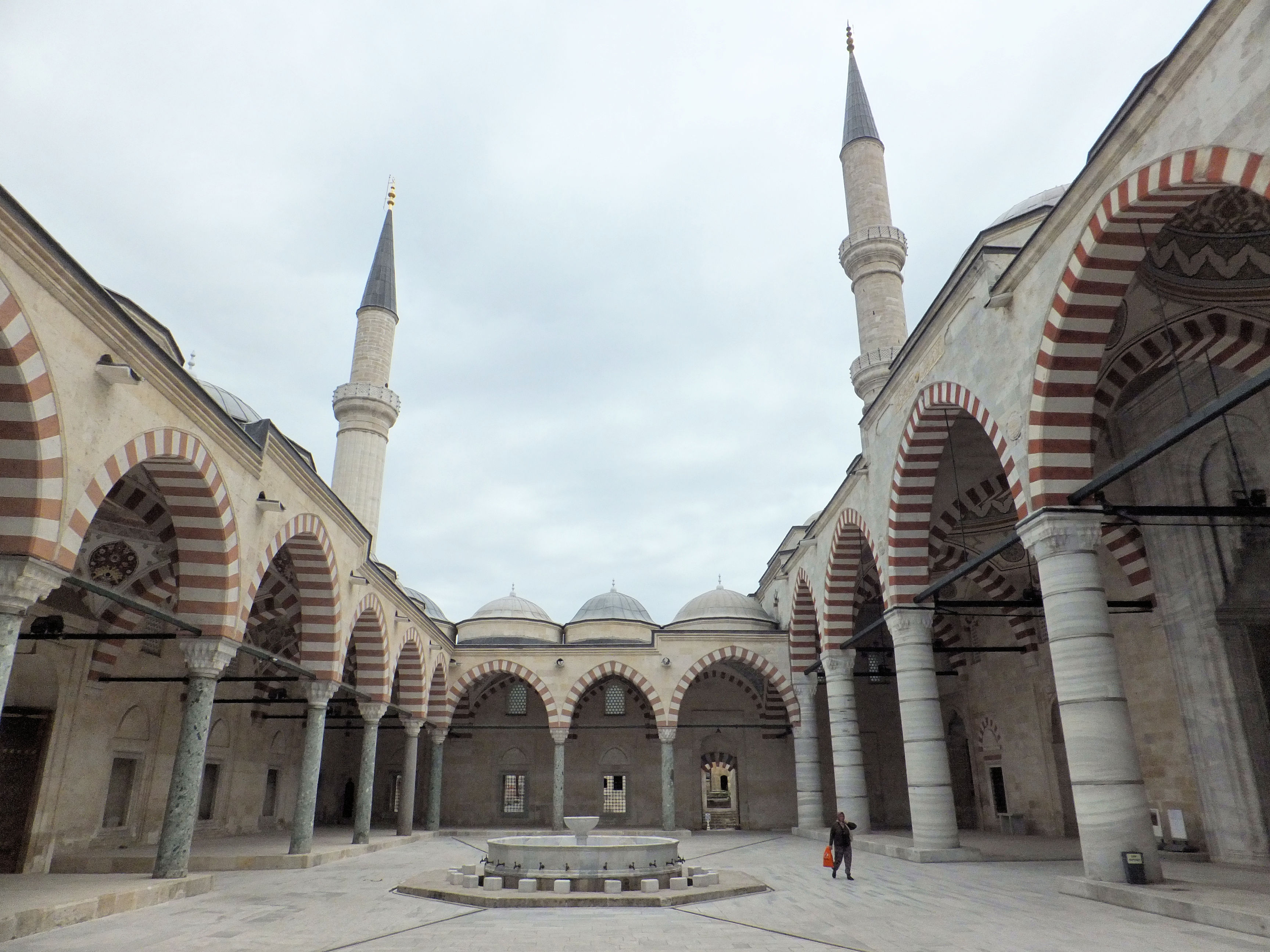
Üç Şerefeli Mosque: courtyard

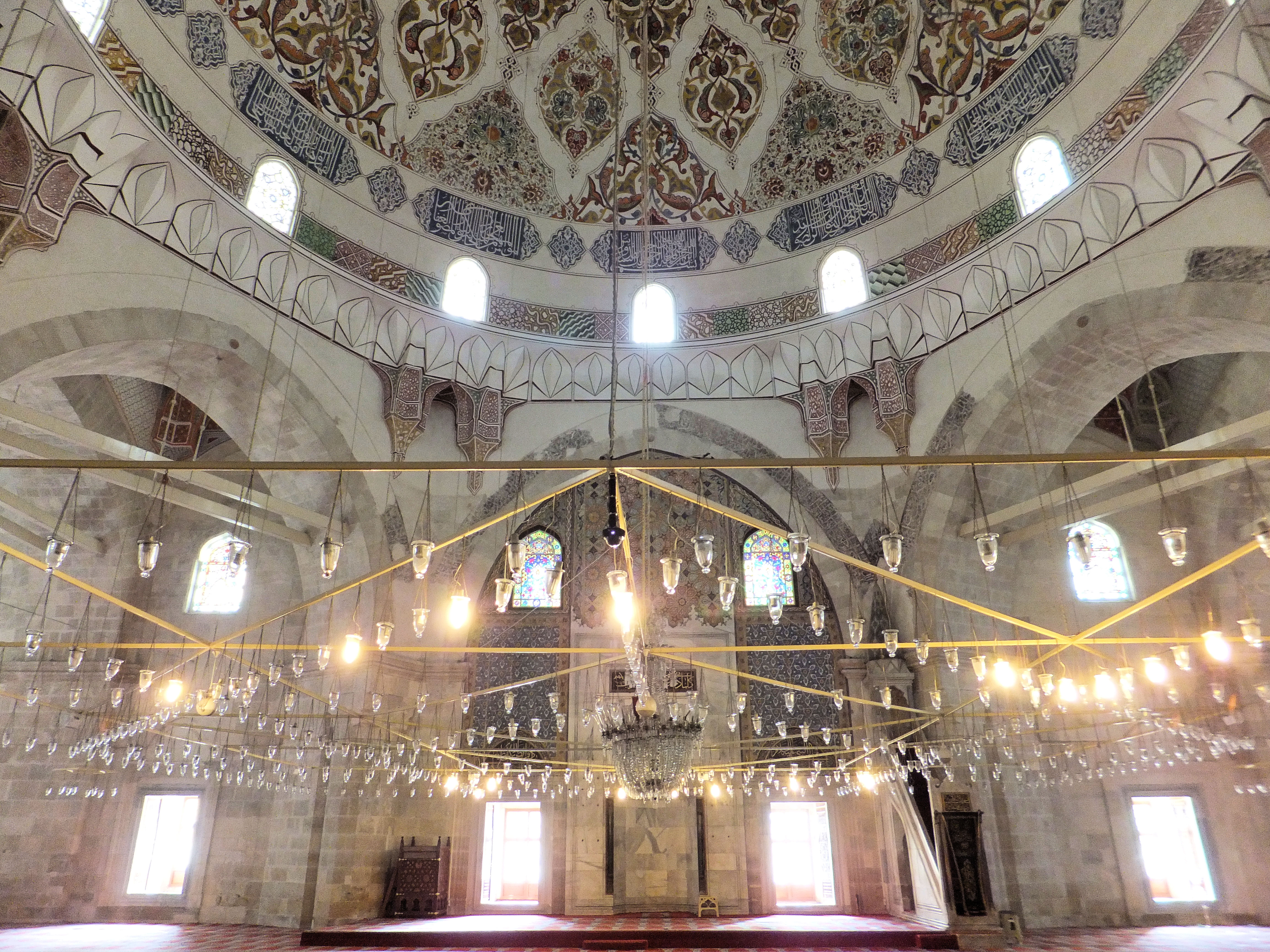
Üç Şerefeli Mosque: interior

== Mehmed II and early Ottoman Constantinople ==
=== Constructions around the time of the 1453 conquest ===
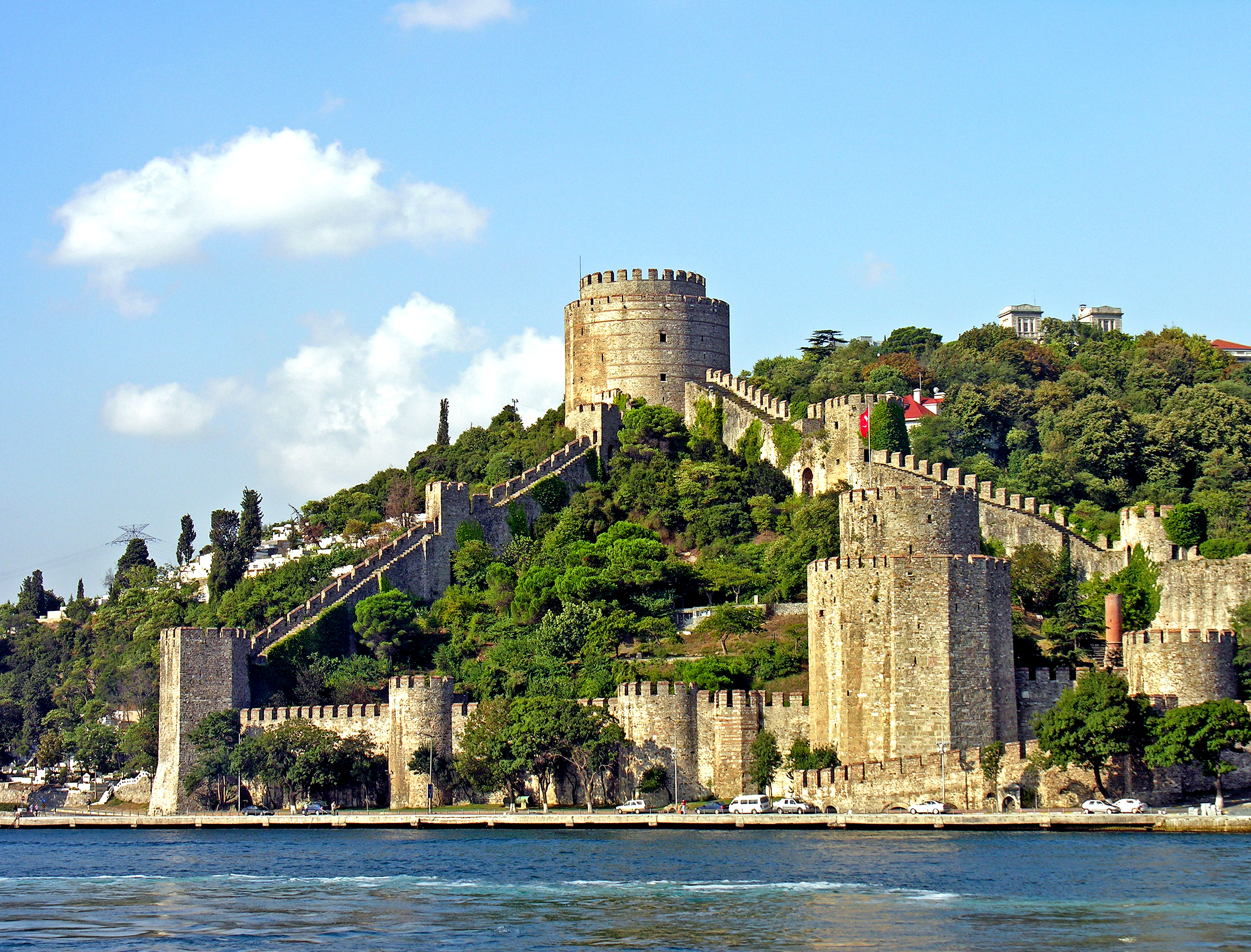
Rumeli Hisarı on the Bosphorus shore

Mehmed II succeeded his father temporarily in 1444 and definitively in 1451. He is also known as "Fatih" or the Conqueror after his conquest of Constantinople in 1453, which brought the remains of the Byzantine Empire to an end. Mehmed was strongly interested in Turkish, Persian, and European cultures and sponsored artists and writers at his court. Before the 1453 conquest his capital remained at Edirne, where he completed a new palace for himself in 1452-53. He made extensive preparations for the siege, including the construction of a large fortress known as Rumeli Hisarı on the western shore of the Bosphorus, begun in 1451-52 and completed shortly before the siege in 1453. This was located across from an older fortress on the eastern shore known as Anadolu Hisarı, built by Bayezid I in the 1390s for an earlier siege, and was designed to cut off communications to the city through the Bosphorus. Rumeli Hisarı remains one of the most impressive medieval Ottoman fortifications. It consists of three large round towers connected by curtain walls, with an irregular layout adapted to the topography of the site. A small mosque was built inside the fortified enclosure. The towers once had conical roofs, but these disappeared in the 19th century.

After the conquest of Constantinople (now known as Istanbul), one of Mehmed's first constructions in the city was a palace, known as the Old Palace (Eski Saray), built in 1455 on the site of what is now the main campus of Istanbul University. At the same time, Mehmed built another fortress, Yedikule ("Seven Towers"), at the south end of the city's land walls in order to house and protect the treasury. It was completed in 1457–1458. Unlike Rumeli Hisarı, it has a regular layout in the shape of a five-pointed star, possibly of Italian inspiration. In order to revitalize commerce, Mehmed built the first bedesten in Istanbul between 1456 and 1461, variously known as the Inner Bedesten (Iç Bedesten), Old Bedesten (Eski Bedesten or Bedesten-i Atik), or the Jewellers' Bedesten (Cevahir Bedesteni). A second bedesten, the Sandal Bedesten, also known as the Small Bedesten (Küçük Bedesten) or New Bedesten (Bedesten-i Cedid), was built by Mehmed about a dozen years later. These two bedestens, each consisting of a large multi-dome hall, form the original core of what is now the Grand Bazaar, which grew around them over the following generations. The nearby Tahtakale Hammam, the oldest hammam (public bathhouse) of the city, also dates from around this time. The only other documented hammams in the city which date from the time of Mehmet II are the Mahmut Pasha Hamam (part of the Mahmut Pasha Mosque's complex) built in 1466 and the Gedik Ahmet Pasha Hamam built around 1475. In the city of Thessaloniki, Mehmed II also commissioned the construction of a bedesten (still standing today) sometime in the 1450s.

Buildings from around the time of the 1453 conquest or shortly after

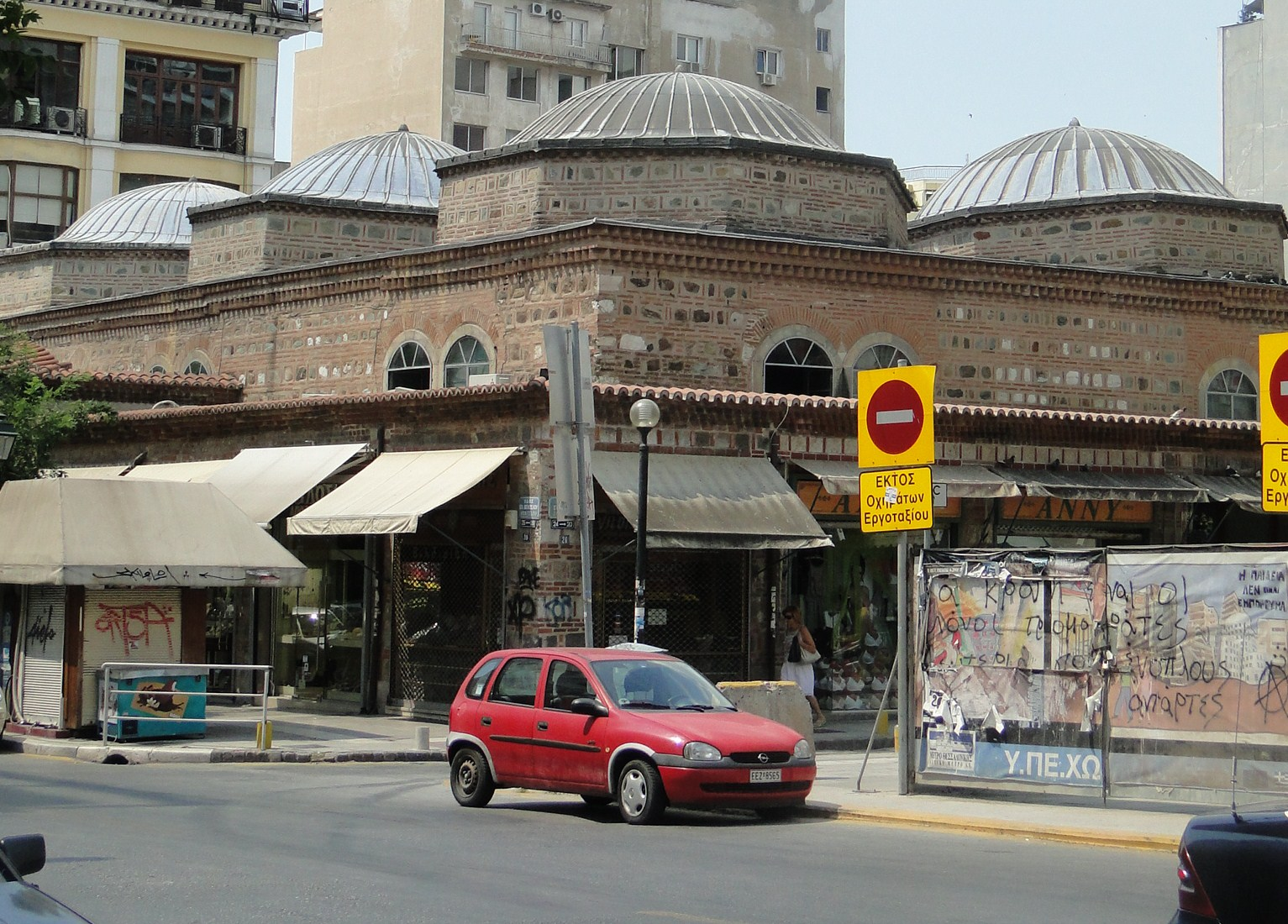
Bedesten of Thessaloniki (1450s)

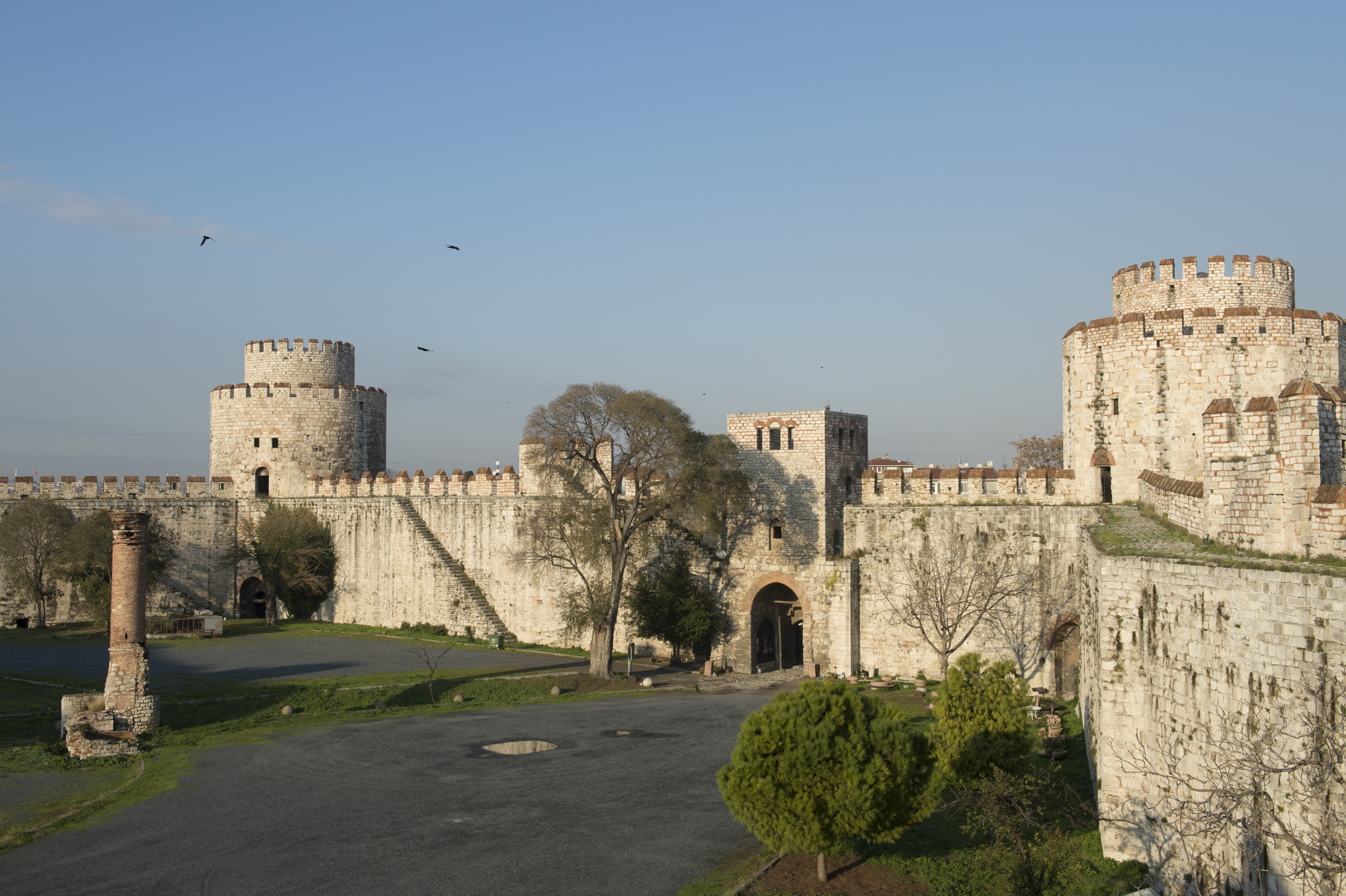
Yedikule Fortress in Istanbul (circa 1458)

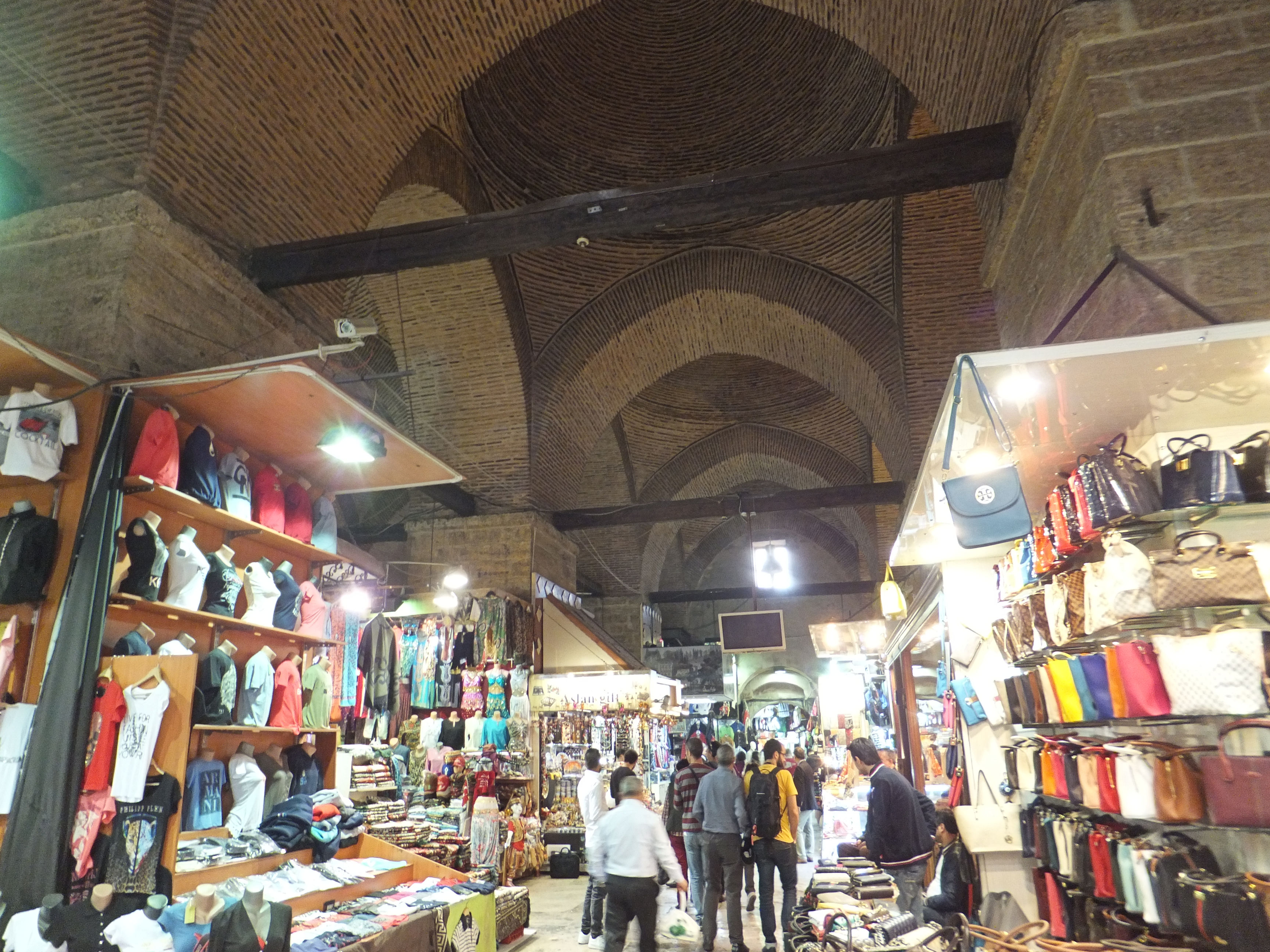
Interior of the Sandal Bedesten in the Grand Bazaar, Istanbul (between 1456 and 1461)

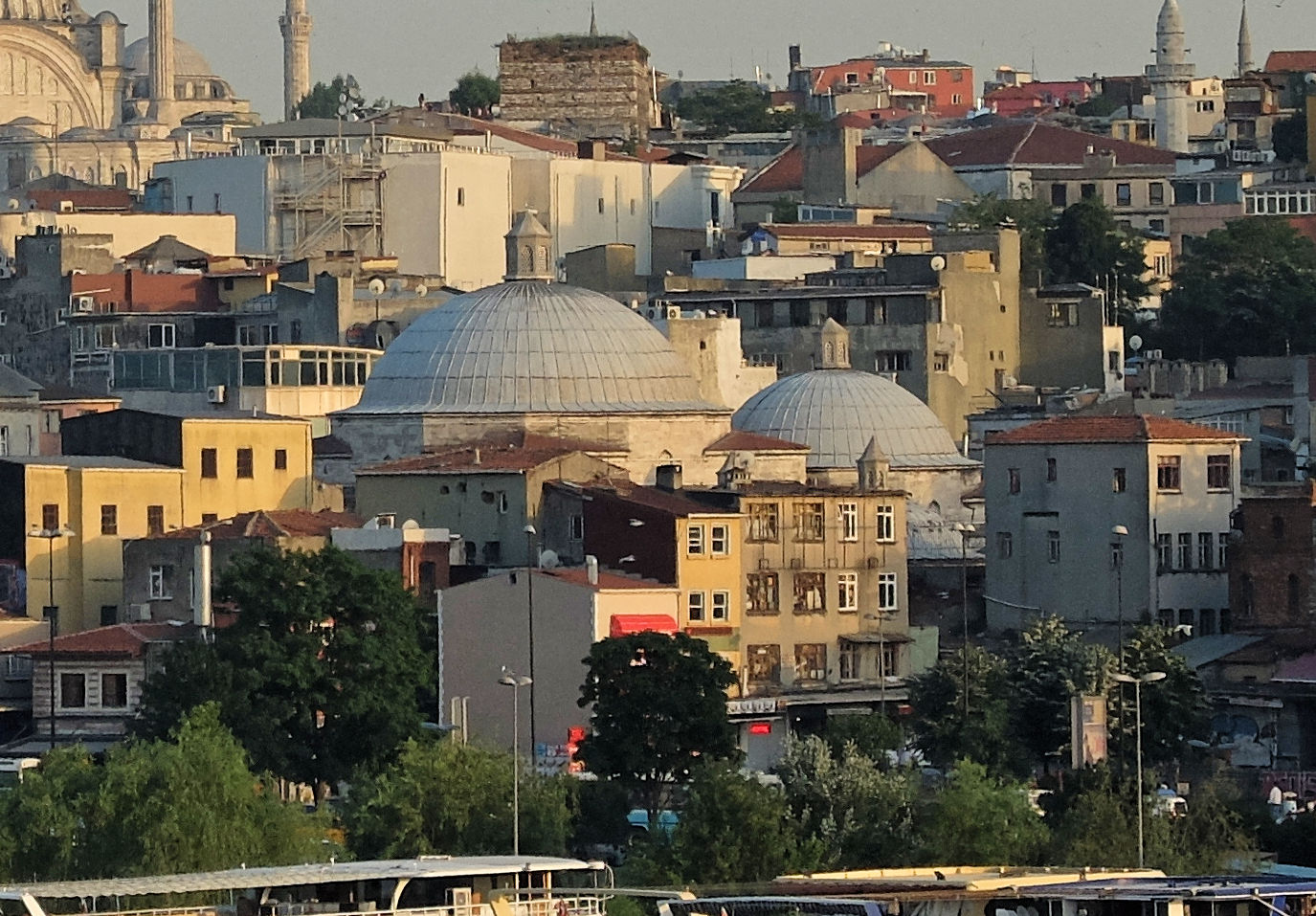
Domes of the Tahtakale Hamam on the skyline

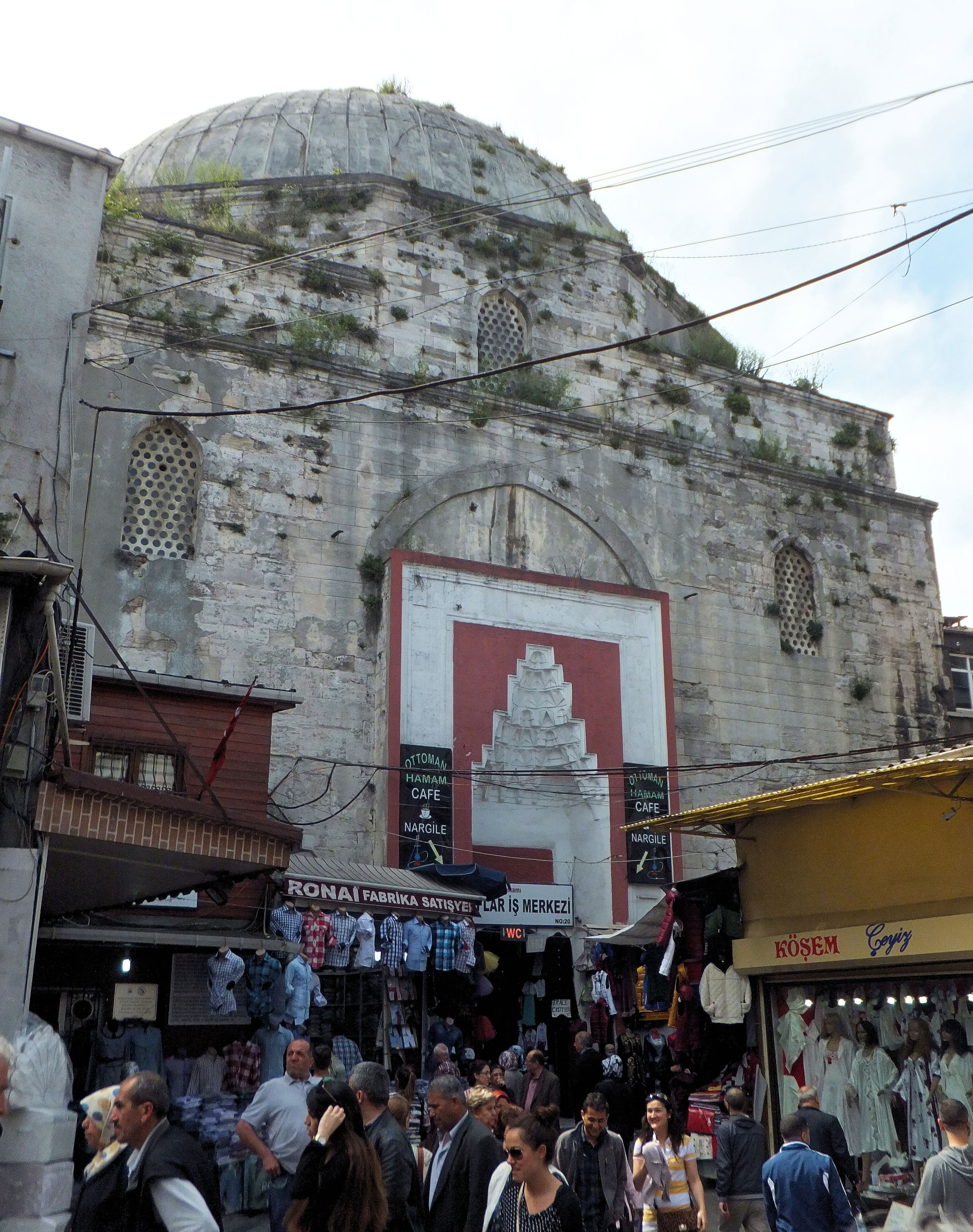
Mahmut Pasha Hamam, Istanbul (1466)

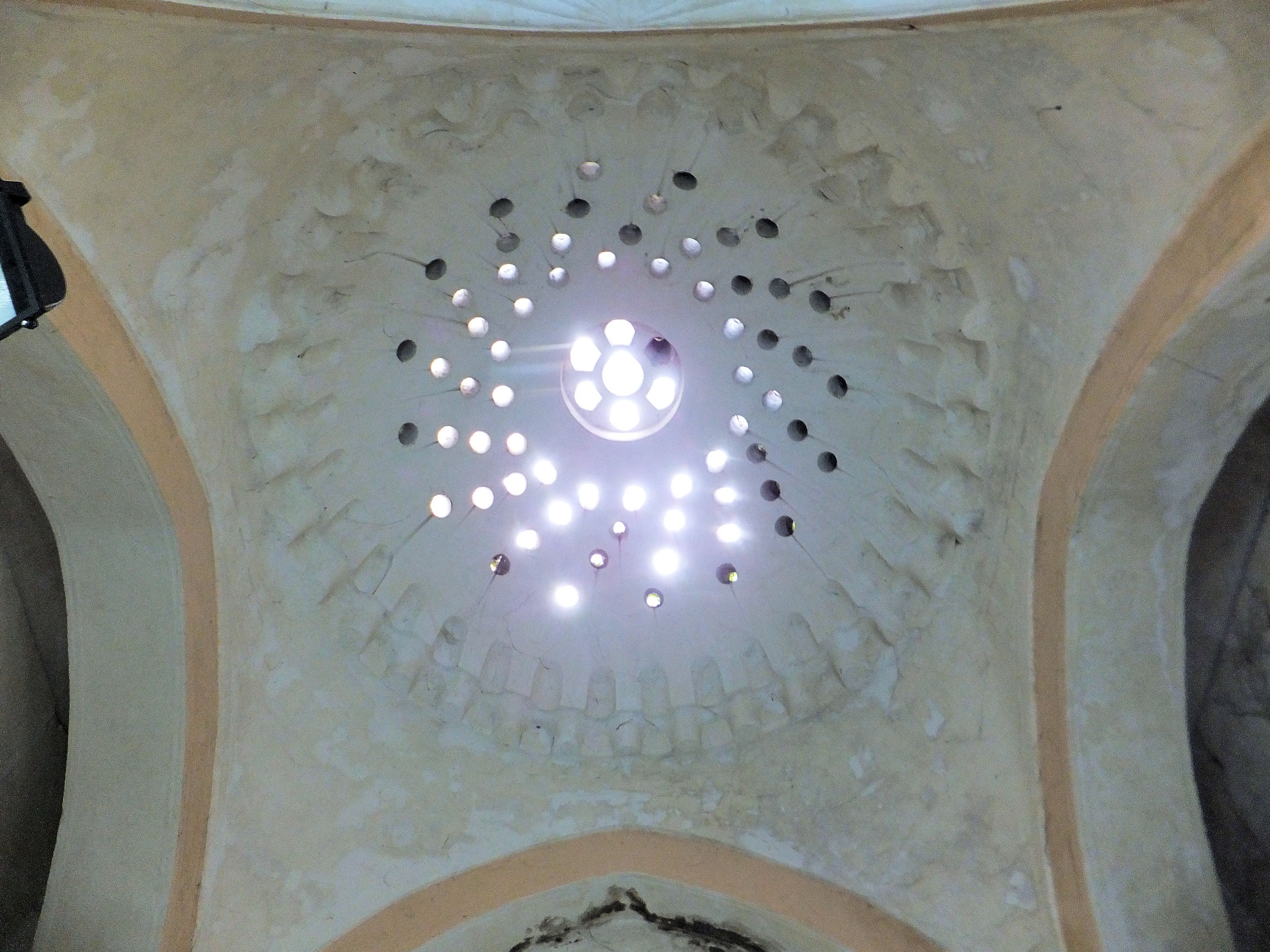
Mahmut Pasha Hamam: dome over the warm room

=== Creation of Topkapı Palace ===
In 1459 Mehmed II began construction of a second palace, known as the New Palace (Yeni Saray) and later as the Topkapı Palace ("Cannon-Gate Palace"), on the site of the former acropolis of Byzantium, a hill overlooking the Bosphorus. The palace was mostly laid out between 1459 and 1465. Initially it remained mostly an administrative palace, while the residence of the sultan remained at the Old Palace. It only became a royal residence in the 16th century, when the harem section was constructed. The palace has been repeatedly modified over subsequent centuries by different rulers, with the palace today now representing an accumulation of different styles and periods. Its overall layout appears highly irregular, consisting of several courtyards and enclosures within a precinct delimited by an outer wall. The seemingly irregular layout of the palace was in fact a reflection of a clear hierarchical organization of functions and private residences, with the innermost areas reserved for the privacy of the sultan and his innermost circle.

Among the structures today that date from Mehmet's time is the Fatih Kiosk or Pavilion of Mehmed II, located on the east side of the Third Court and built in 1462–1463. It consists of a series of domed chambers preceded by an arcaded portico on the palace-facing side. It stands on top of a heavy substructure built into the hillside overlooking the Bosphorus. This lower level also originally served as a treasury. The presence of strongly-built foundation walls and substructures like this was a common characteristic of Ottoman construction in this palace as well as other architectural complexes. Bab-ı Hümayun, the main outer entrance to the palace grounds, dates from Mehmet II's time according to an inscription that gives the date 1478–1479, but it was covered in new marble during the 19th century. Kuban also argues that the Babüsselam (Gate of Salution), the gate to the Second Court flanked by two towers, dates to the time of Mehmed II.

Within the outer gardens of the palace, Mehmed II commissioned three pavilions built in three different styles. One pavilion was in Ottoman style, another in Greek style, and a third one in a Persian style. Of these, only the Persian pavilion, known as the Tiled Kiosk (Çinili Köşk), has survived. It was completed in September or October 1472 and its name derives from its rich tile decoration, including the first appearance of Iranian-inspired banna'i tilework in Istanbul. The vaulting and cruciform layout of the building's interior is also based on Iranian precedents, while the exterior is fronted by a tall portico. Although not much is known about the builders, they were likely of Iranian origin, as historical documents indicate the presence of tile cutters from Khorasan.

Palace architecture of Mehmed II

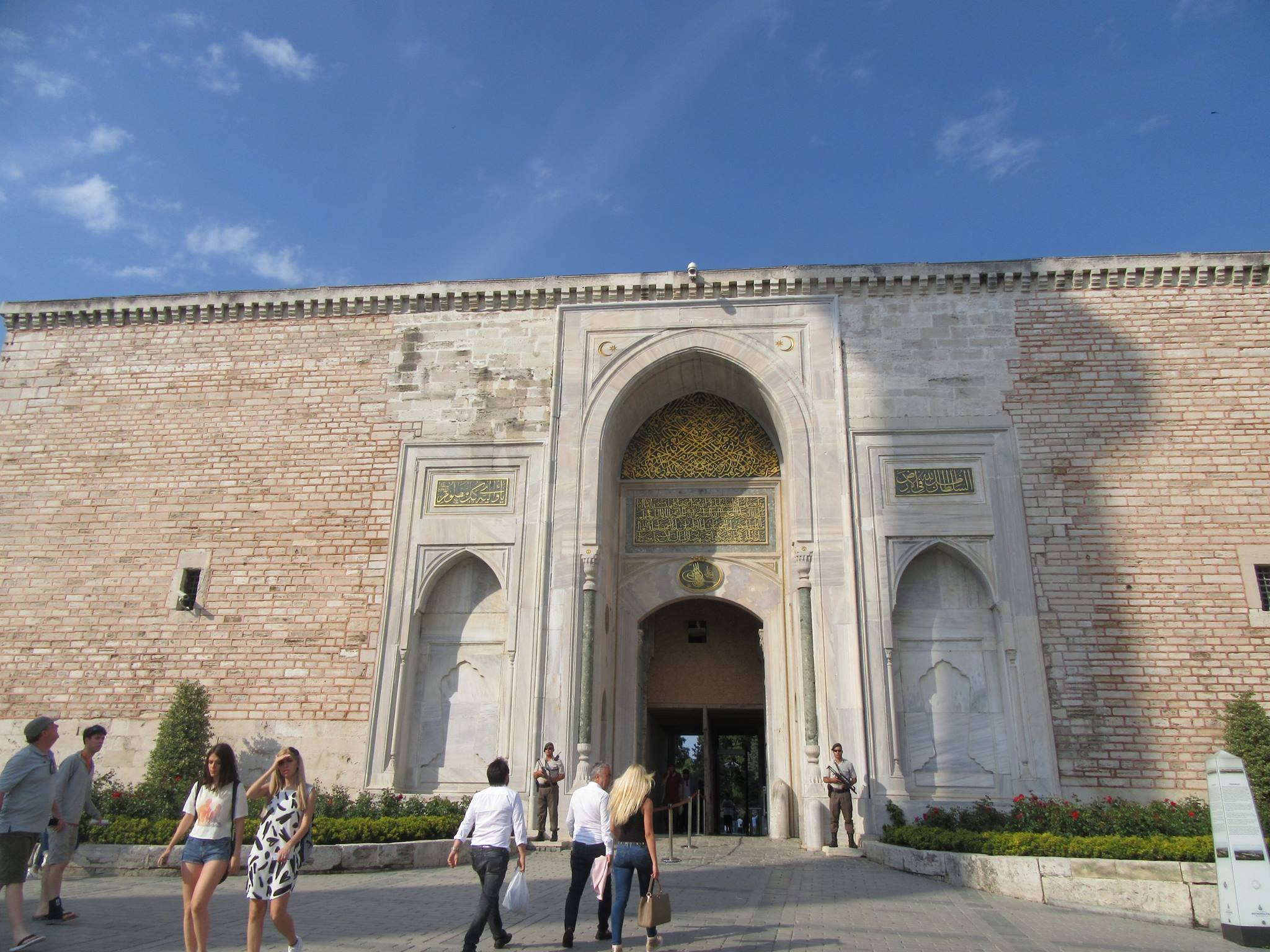
Bab-ı Hümayun, the outer gate to the Topkapi Palace (1478–1479, with later renovations)

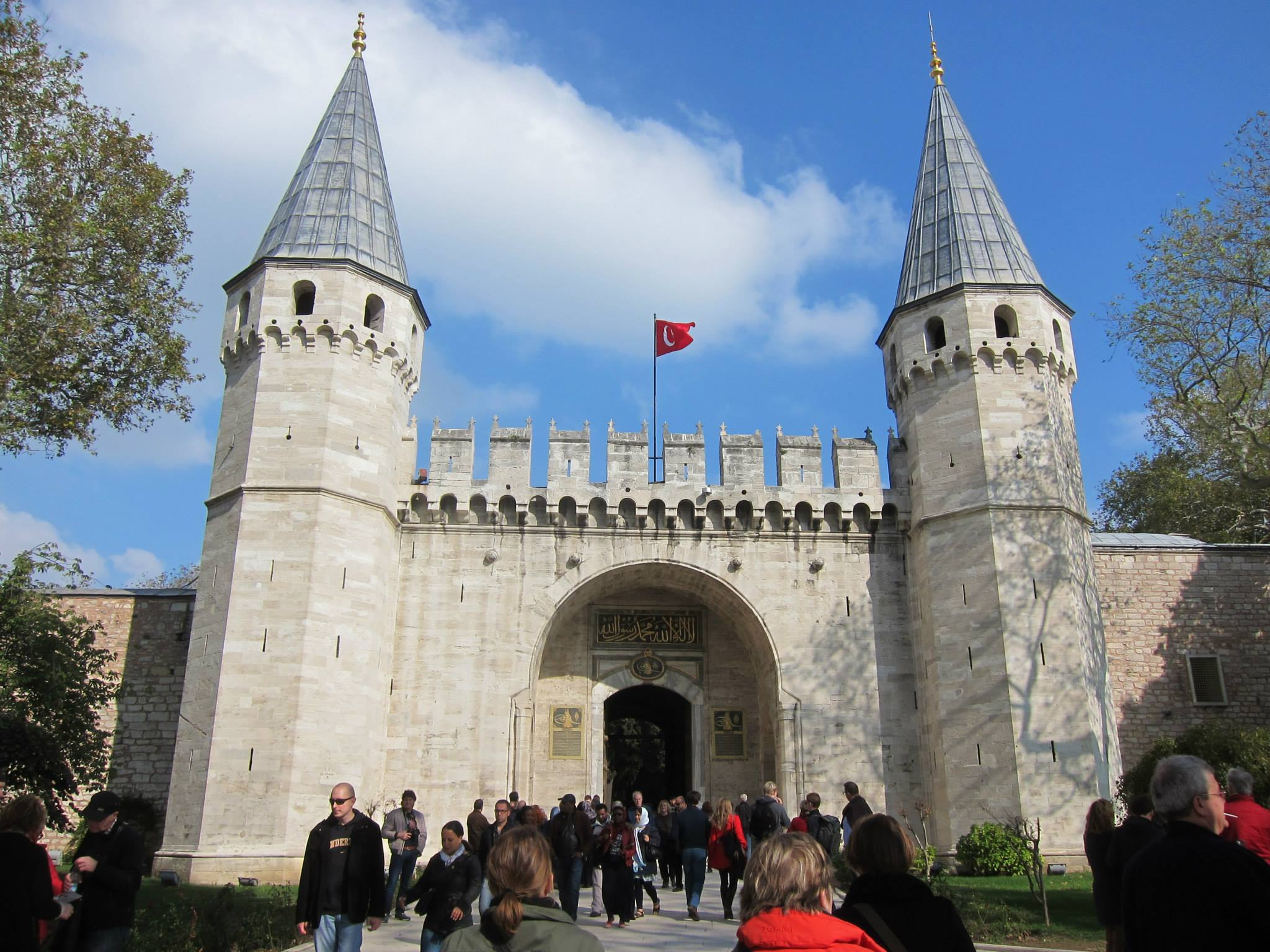
Babüsselam, the gate to the Second Court in Topkapi Palace

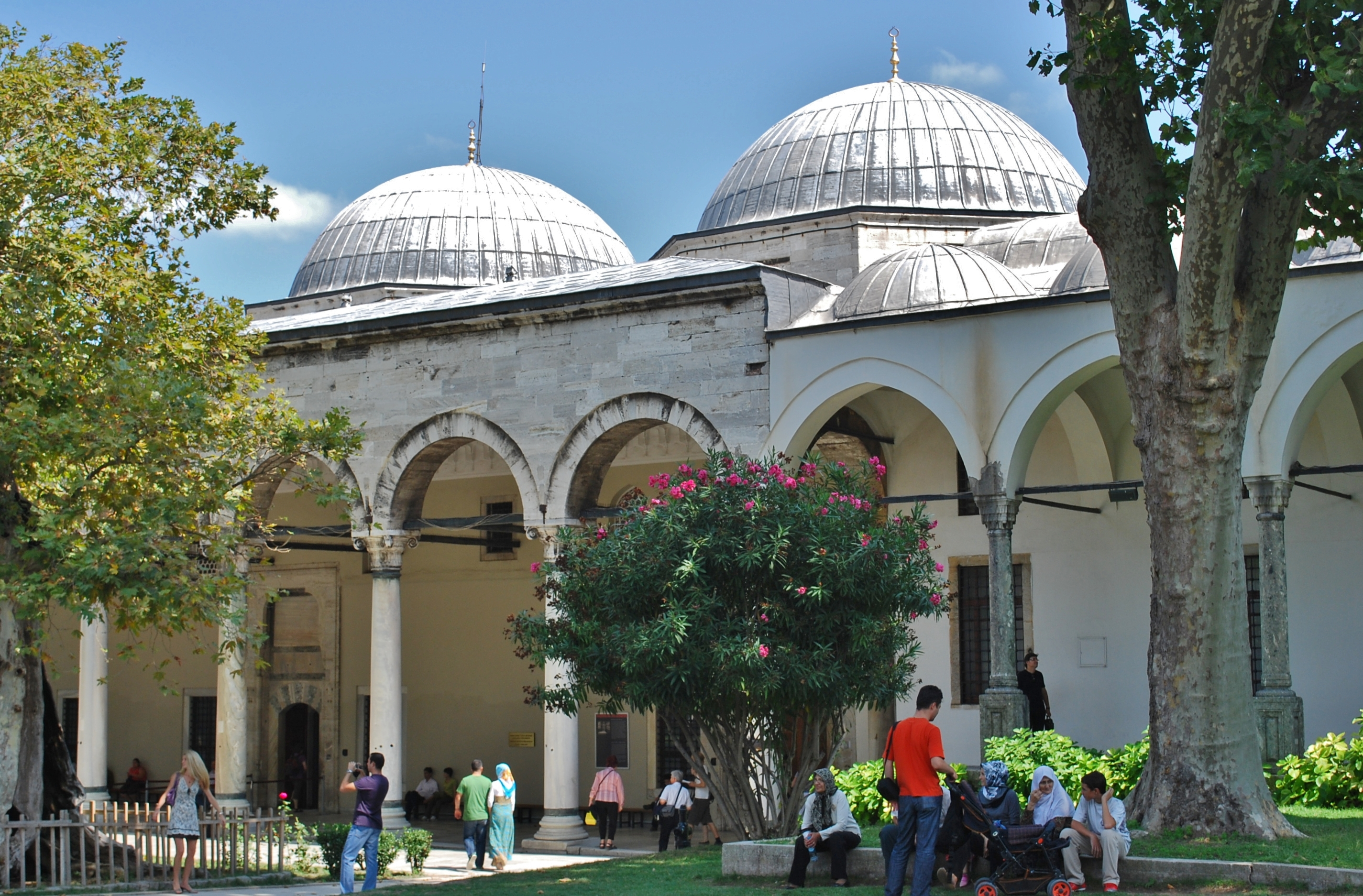
Fatih Kiosk in the Third Court of Topkapi Palace (1462–1463)

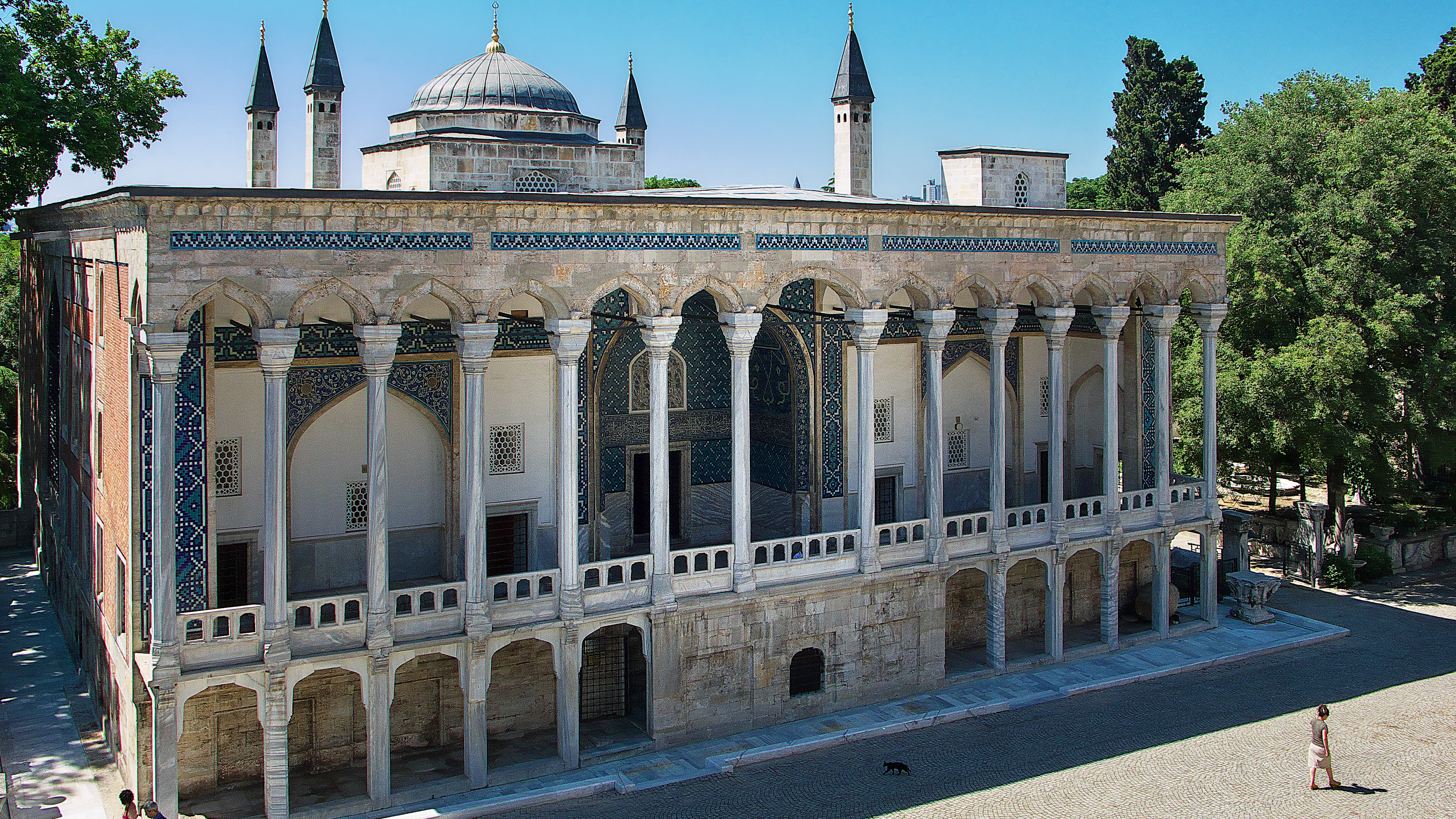
Tiled Kiosk in the outer gardens of Topkapi Palace (1472)

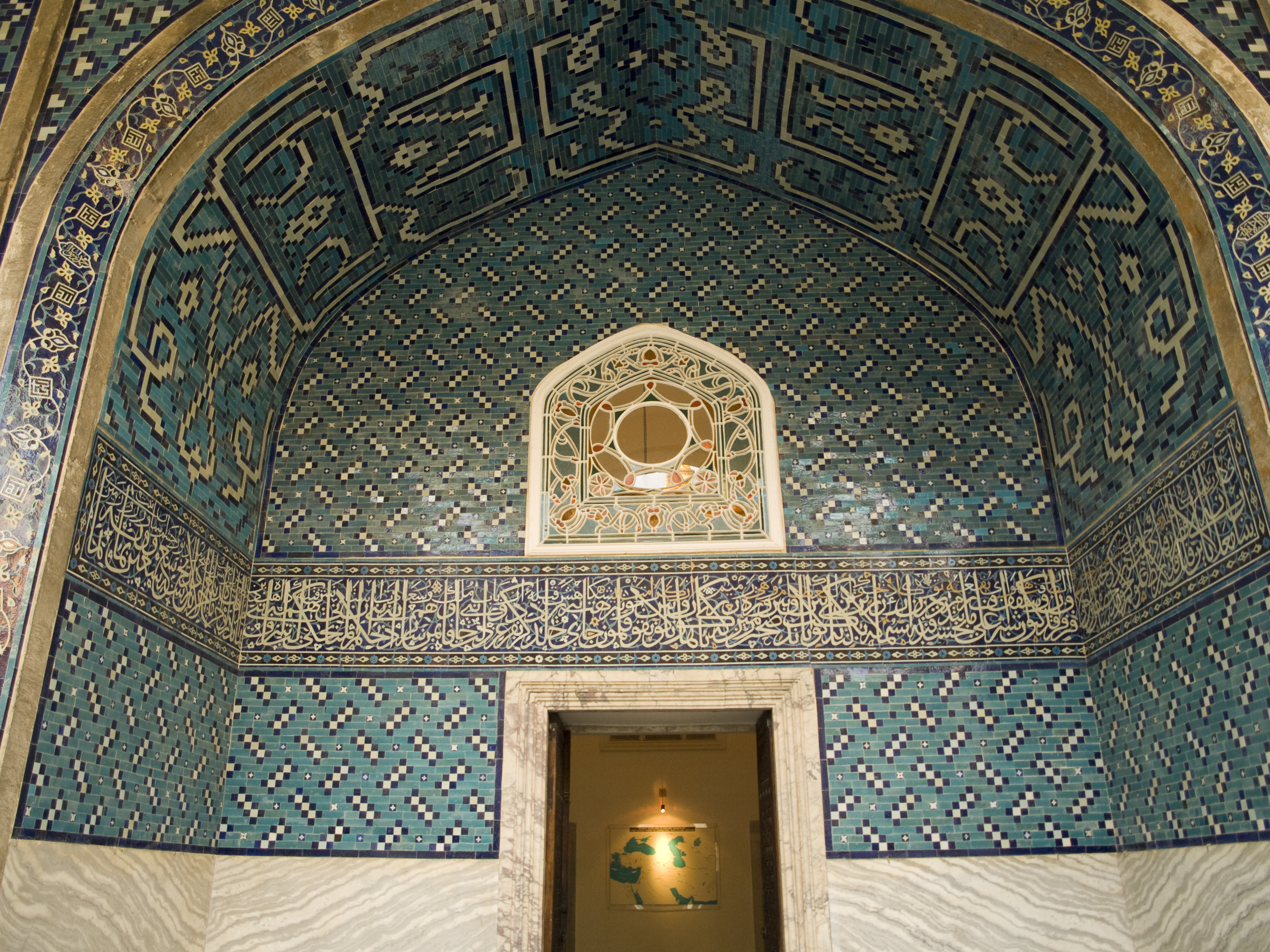
Tile decoration of the Tiled Kiosk

=== Construction of the Fatih Mosque ===
Mehmed's largest contribution to religious architecture was the Fatih Mosque complex in Istanbul, built from 1463 to 1470. It was part of a very large külliye which also included a tabhane (guesthouse for travelers), an imaret, a darüşşifa (hospital), a caravanserai (hostel for traveling merchants), a mektep (primary school), a library, a hammam, shops, a cemetery with the founder's mausoleum, and eight madrasas along with their annexes. Not all of these structures have survived to the present day. The buildings largely ignored any existing topography and were arranged in a strongly symmetrical layout on a vast square terrace with the monumental mosque at its center. The architect of the mosque complex was Usta Sinan, known as Sinan the Elder. It was located on the Fourth Hill of Istanbul, which was until then occupied by the ruined Byzantine Church of the Holy Apostles.

Much of the original mosque was destroyed by an earthquake in 1766. It was largely rebuilt by Mustafa III in a significantly altered form shortly afterwards. Only the walls and porticos of the mosque's courtyard and the marble entrance to the prayer hall have survived overall from the original mosque. The form of the rest of the mosque has had to be reconstructed by scholars using historical sources and illustrations. The design likely reflected the combination of the Byzantine church tradition (especially the Hagia Sophia) with the Ottoman tradition that had evolved since the early imperial mosques of Bursa and Edirne. Drawing on the ideas established by the earlier Üç Şerefeli Mosque, the mosque consisted of a rectangular courtyard with a surrounding gallery leading to a domed prayer hall. The prayer hall consisted of a large central dome with a semi-dome behind it (on the qibla side) and flanked by a row of three smaller domes on either side.

Some original decoration can be found along the surviving walls of the courtyard. The column capitals are carved with traditional muqarnas, with designs varying slightly from one to the other. Some of the lunettes above the courtyard windows are filled with panels of cuerda seca tiles in white, yellow, blue, and green, featuring calligraphic inscriptions. These are similar to tiles found in the later Yavuz Selim Mosque (built in the early 15th century) and may therefore have been added here at a later period. More unique are the lunettes over the windows on outer northwest wall of the courtyard. These are filled with verd antique marble that are inlaid with soft white marble to form calligraphic inscriptions. No other example of this type of decoration is found elsewhere in Ottoman architecture.

The original Fatih Mosque

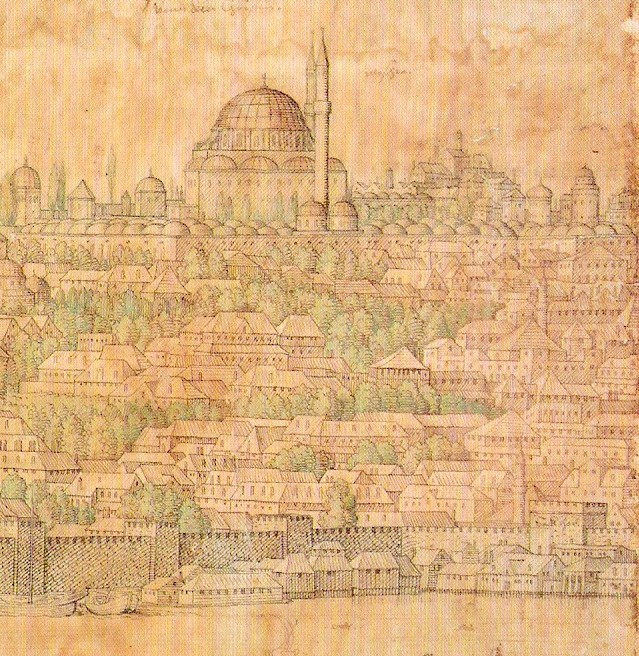
16th-century illustration showing the original Fatih Mosque (top)

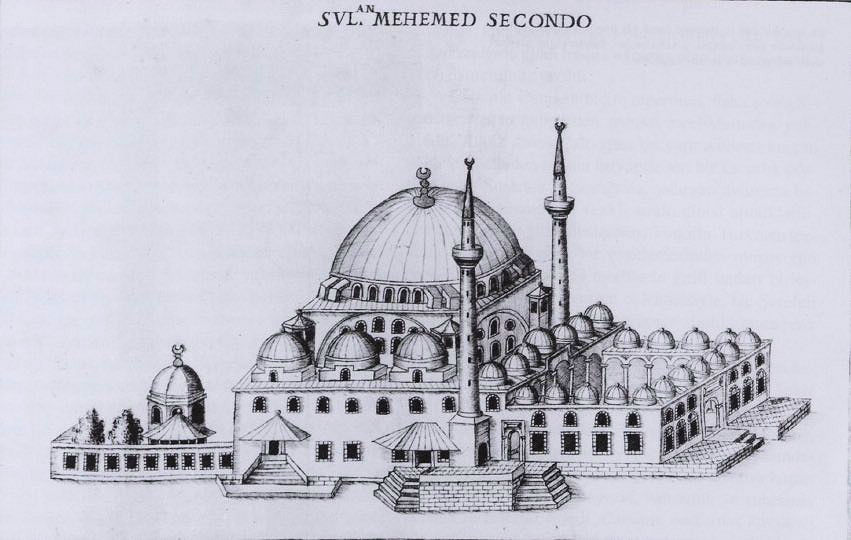
1686 drawing of the original Fatih Mosque (by Francesco Scarella)

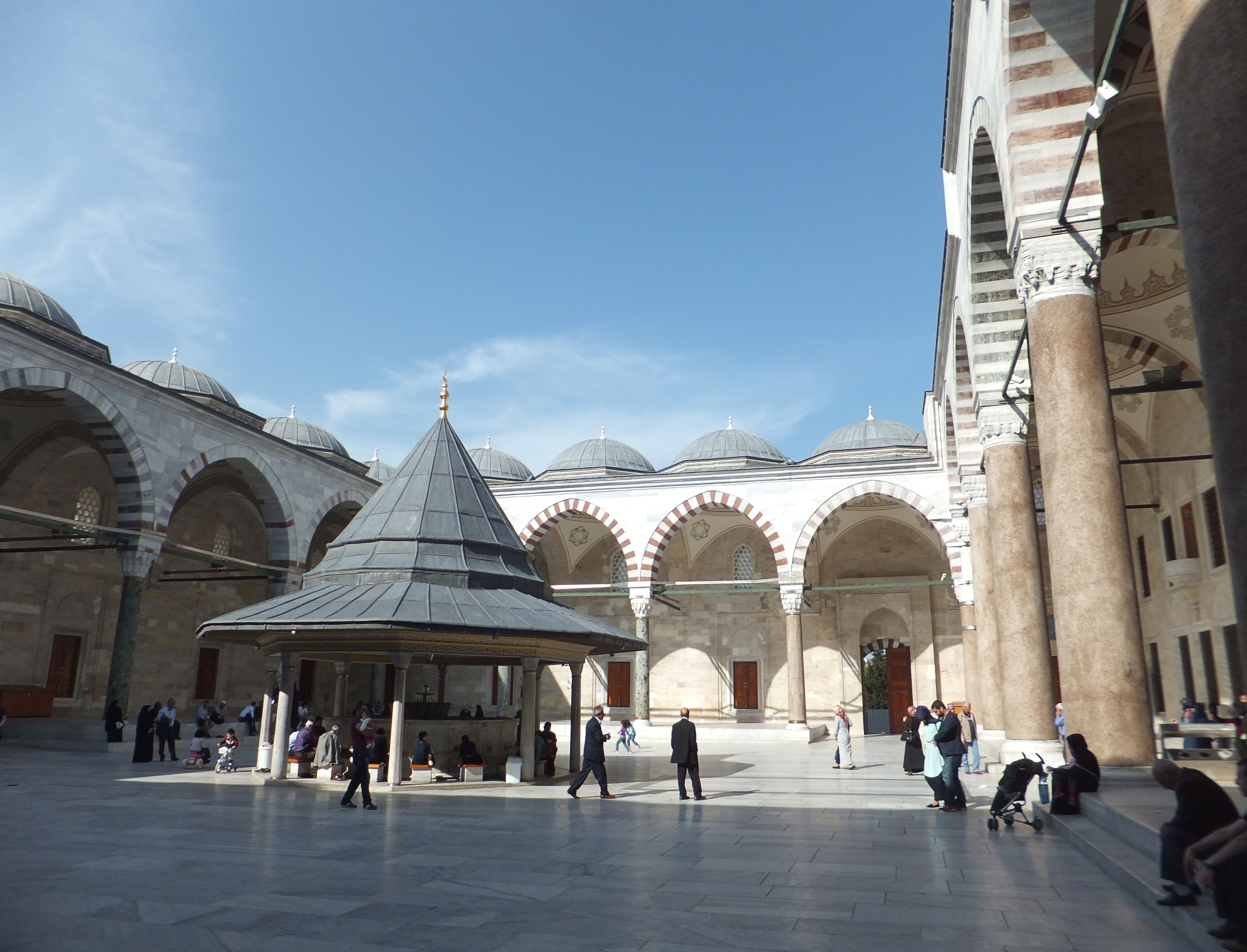
Courtyard of the Fatih Mosque today, which has mostly preserved its original 15th-century fabric

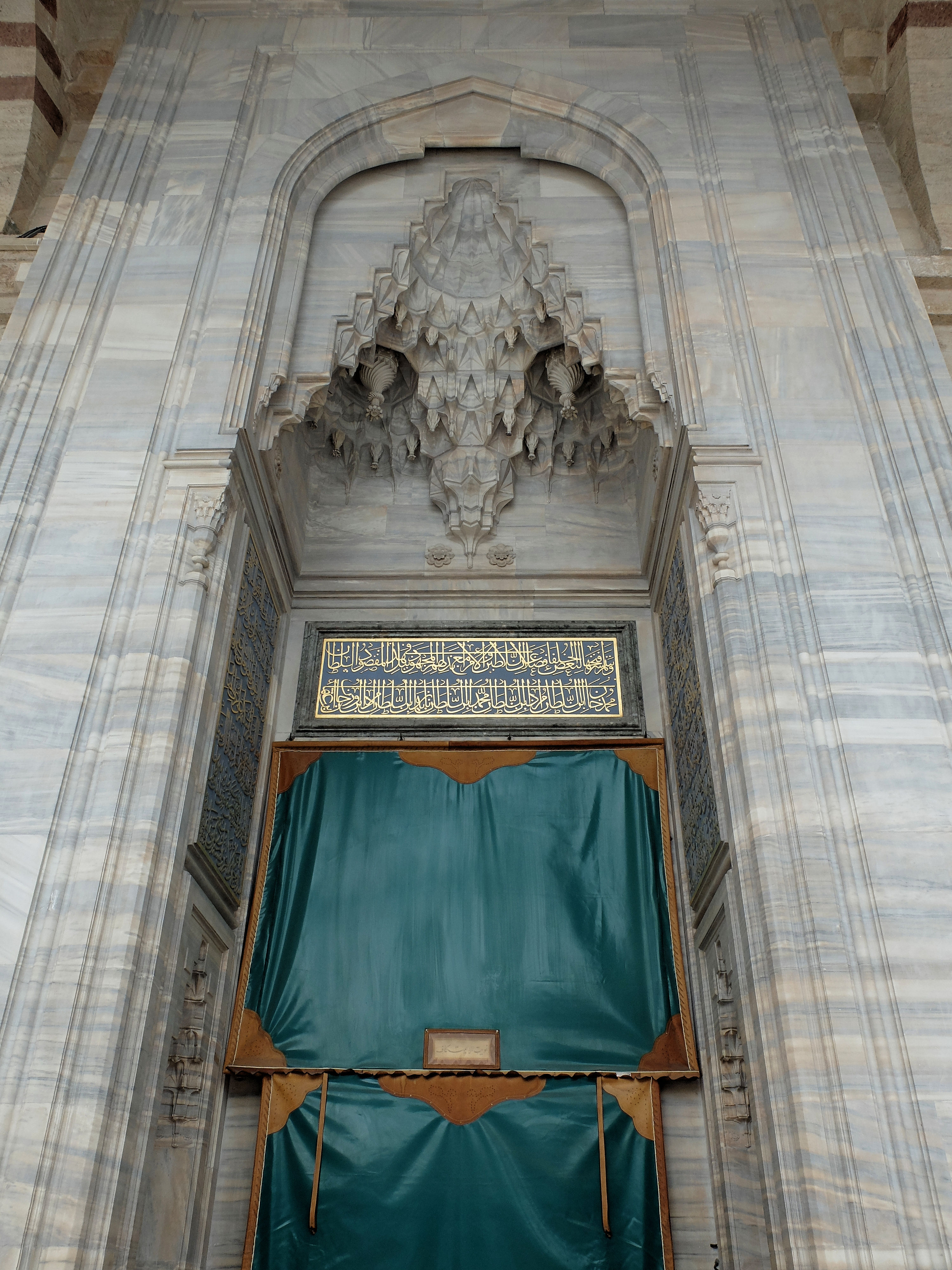
Entrance portal to the prayer hall, also preserved from the original mosque

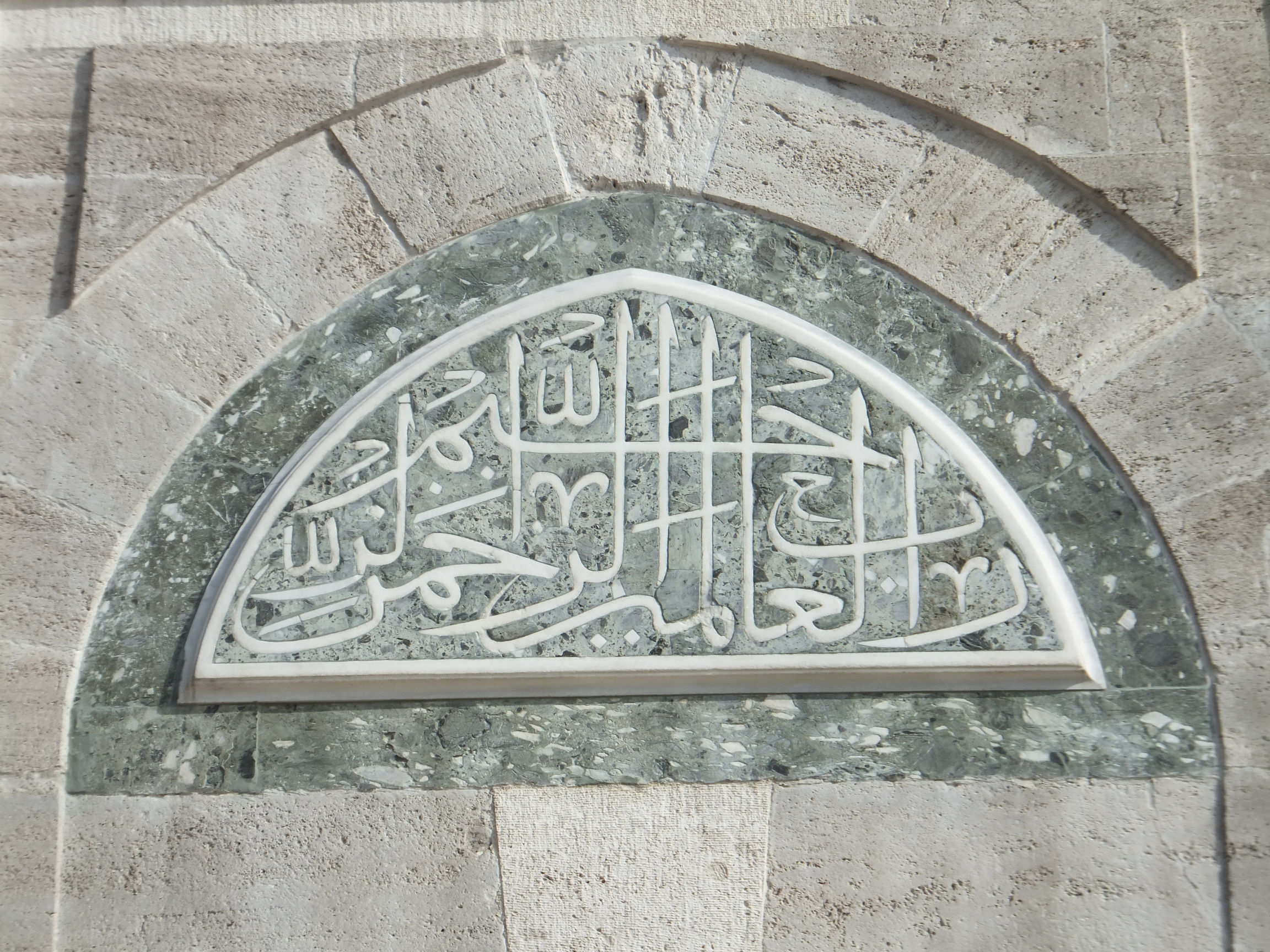
The unusual inlaid marble inscriptions on the northwest wall of the mosque

=== Constructions of Mehmed II's viziers ===
In addition to the royal patronage of Mehmed II himself, Mehmed's viziers and high officials also sponsored many constructions, some of which are among the oldest Ottoman structures in Istanbul. These include the Mahmud Pasha Mosque (1462–1463), the Murad Pasha Mosque (1471–1472), and the Rum Mehmed Pasha Mosque (1471–1472). All of these vizier-sponsored mosques resemble the layout of the older Ottoman T-plan mosques, although they did not serve the same function as the old Ottoman zaviyes that used this form. They consisted of a long prayer hall covered either by two large domes (in the mosques of Mahmud Pasha and Murad Pasha) or by one dome followed by a semi-dome (for the Rum Mehmed Pasha Mosque), with smaller domed rooms serving as tabhanes on either side. The façades of the mosques are fronted by traditional domed porticoes instead of the courtyards seen in the newer imperial mosques. Mosque complexes of a similar scale continued to be built by later viziers under the successors of Mehmed II. The Tomb of Mahmud Pasha, built alongside his aforementioned complex in Istanbul, is also notable for its unique decoration. Its exterior is covered in a mosaic of turquoise and indigo tiles inset into the sandstone walls to form geometric star patterns.

Outside Istanbul, Gedik Ahmet Pasha built a külliye complex in Afyonkarahisar sometime between 1470 and 1474. It consists of a large mosque, madrasa, and hammam. The mosque, which is of high-quality craftsmanship, has a similar layout to other viziers' mosques of the time: a two-domed prayer hall flanked by separate smaller domed chambers serving as tabhanes and fronted by a domed portico. A more primitive multi-domed design is still evident in the earlier Great Mosque (Büyük Cami) of Sofia, in present-day Bulgaria. It was begun between 1444 and 1456 on the initiative of governor Mahmud Pasha (later grand vizier of Mehmed II) but it was not finished until 1494, long after his death. Today the building serves as the National Archaeological Museum of Bulgaria.

Mosques sponsored by viziers of Mehmed II

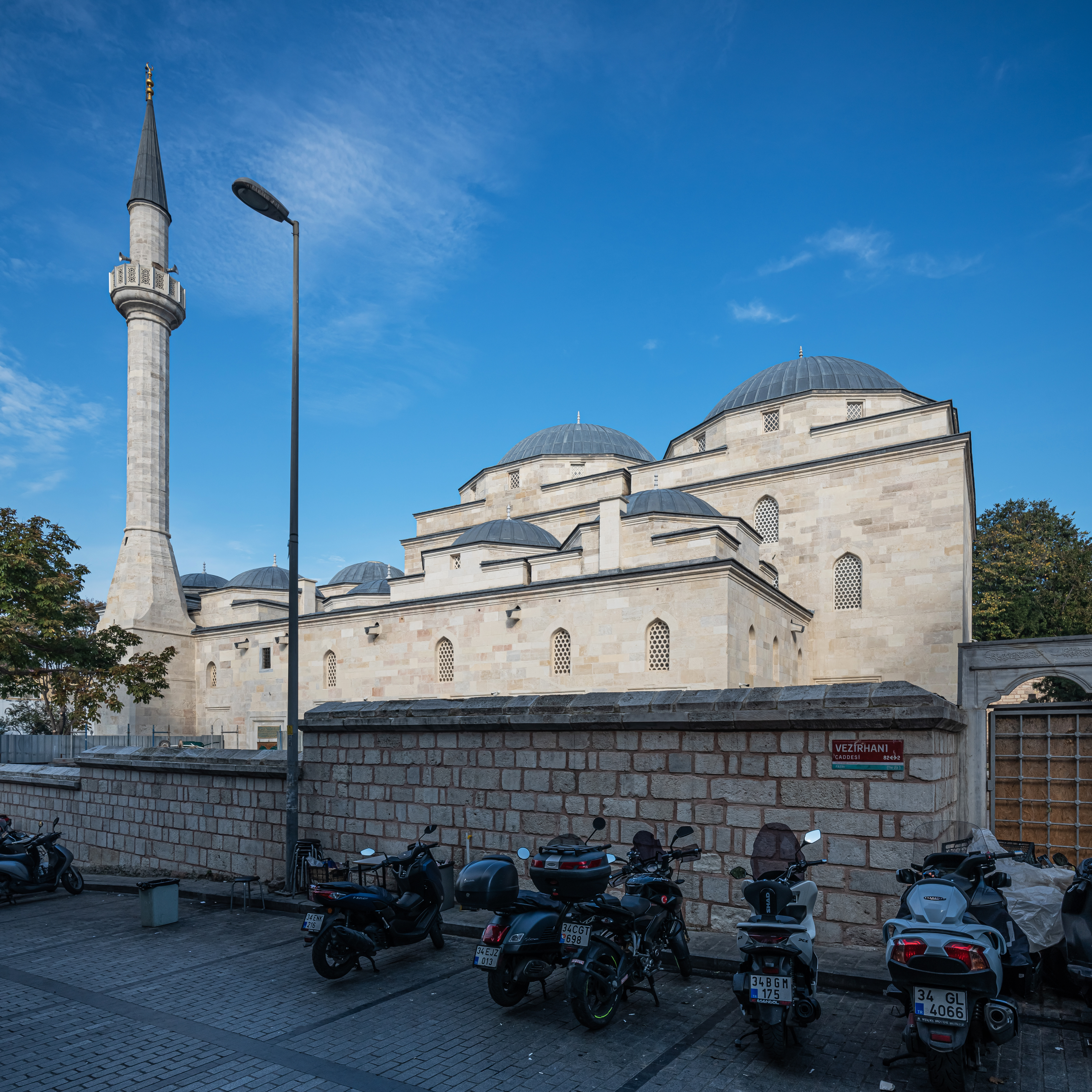
Exterior of the Mahmut Pasha Mosque in Istanbul (1462–63), with a two-dome layout

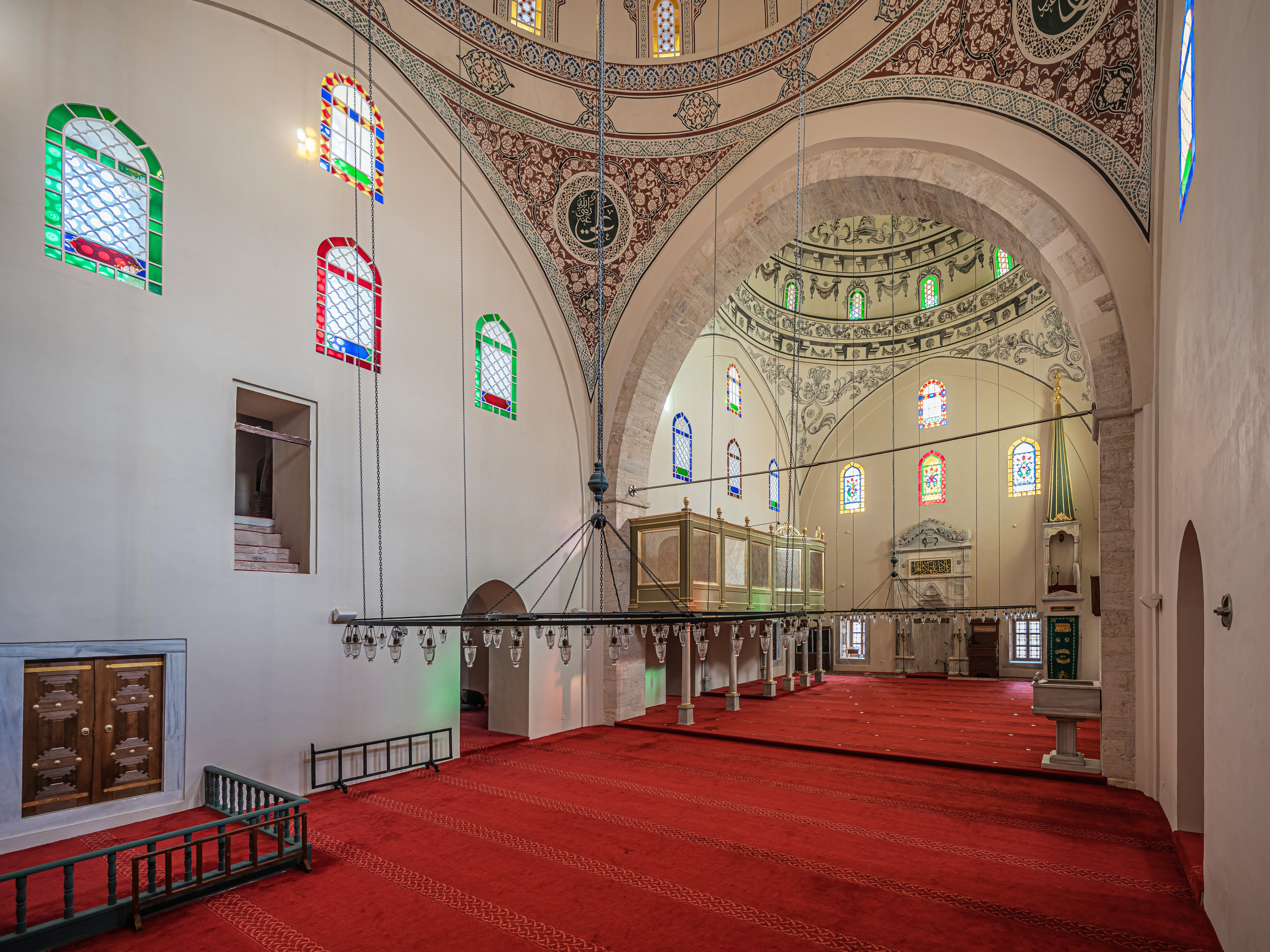
Interior of the Mahmut Pasha Mosque

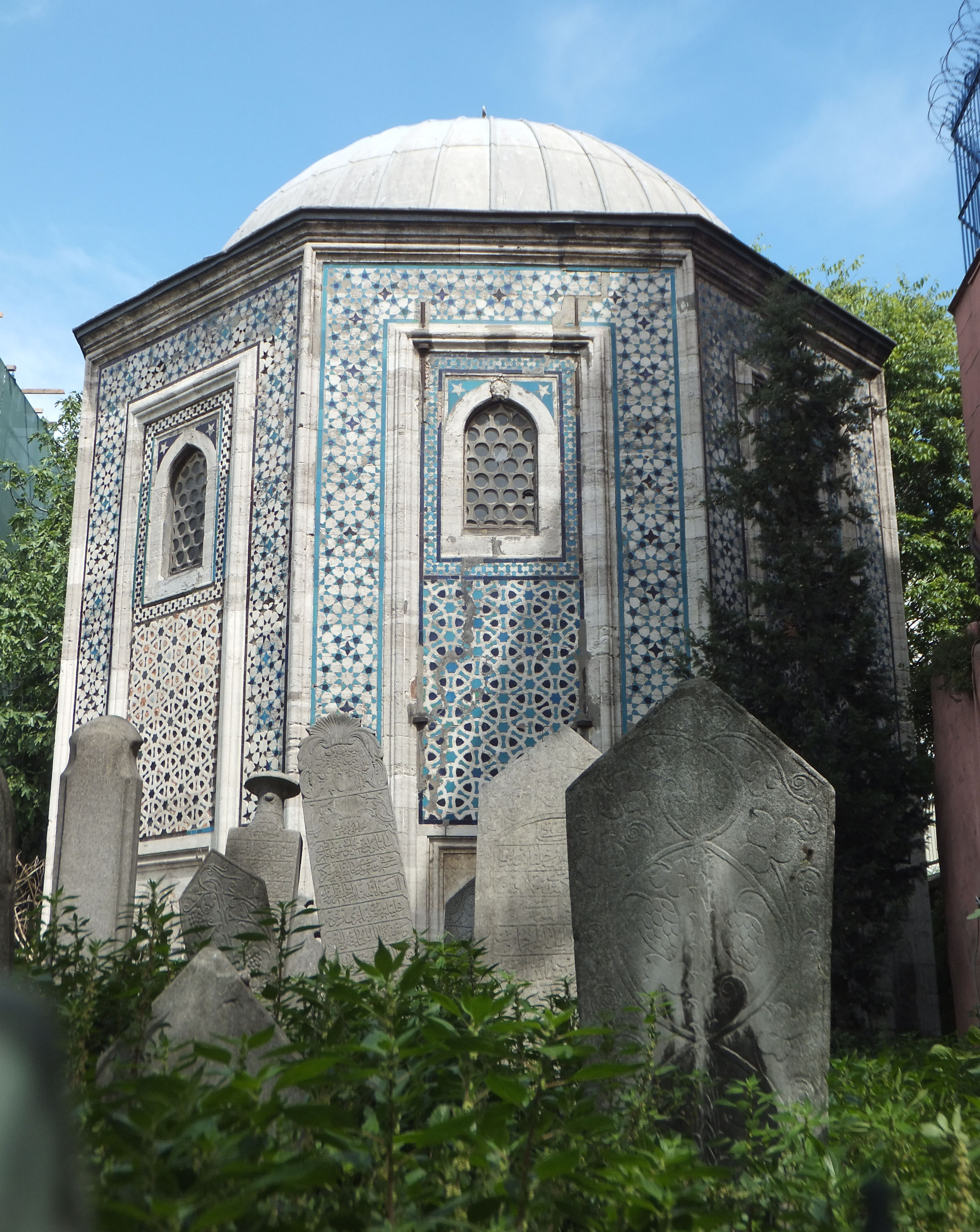
Tomb of Mahmud Pasha in Istanbul (1473), located behind his mosque

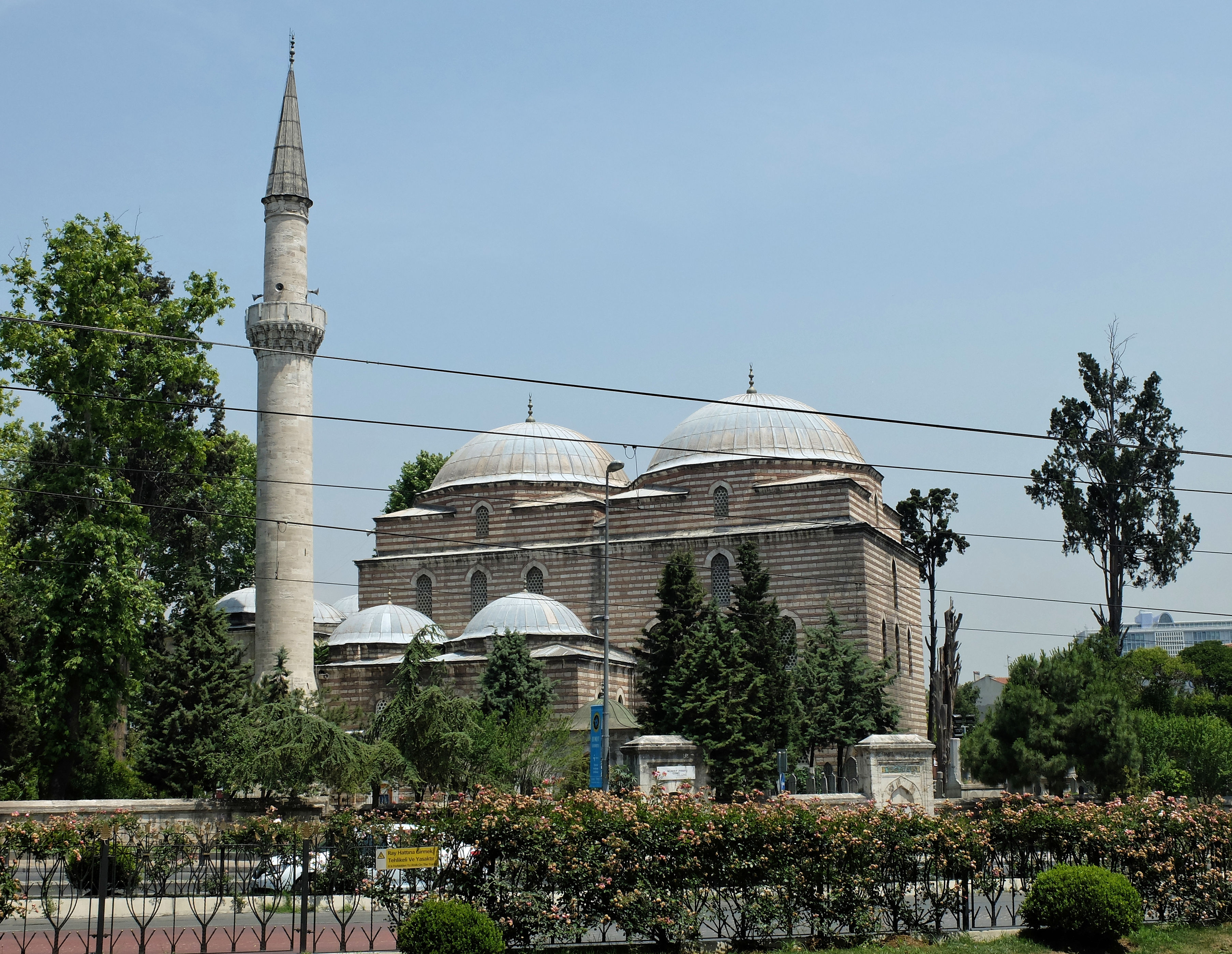
Murad Pasha Mosque in Istanbul (1471–1472), with a two-dome layout

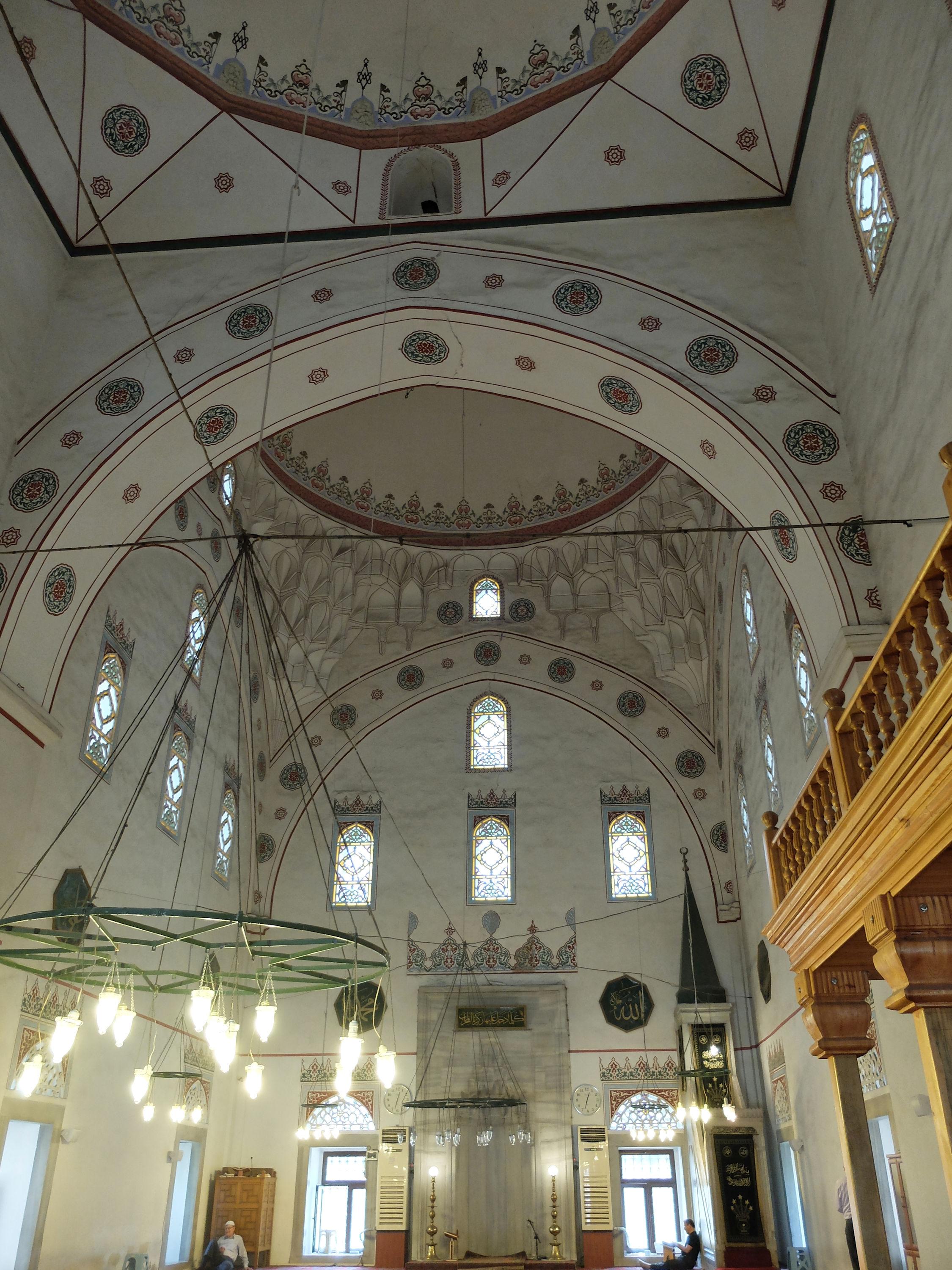
Interior of the Murad Pasha Mosque

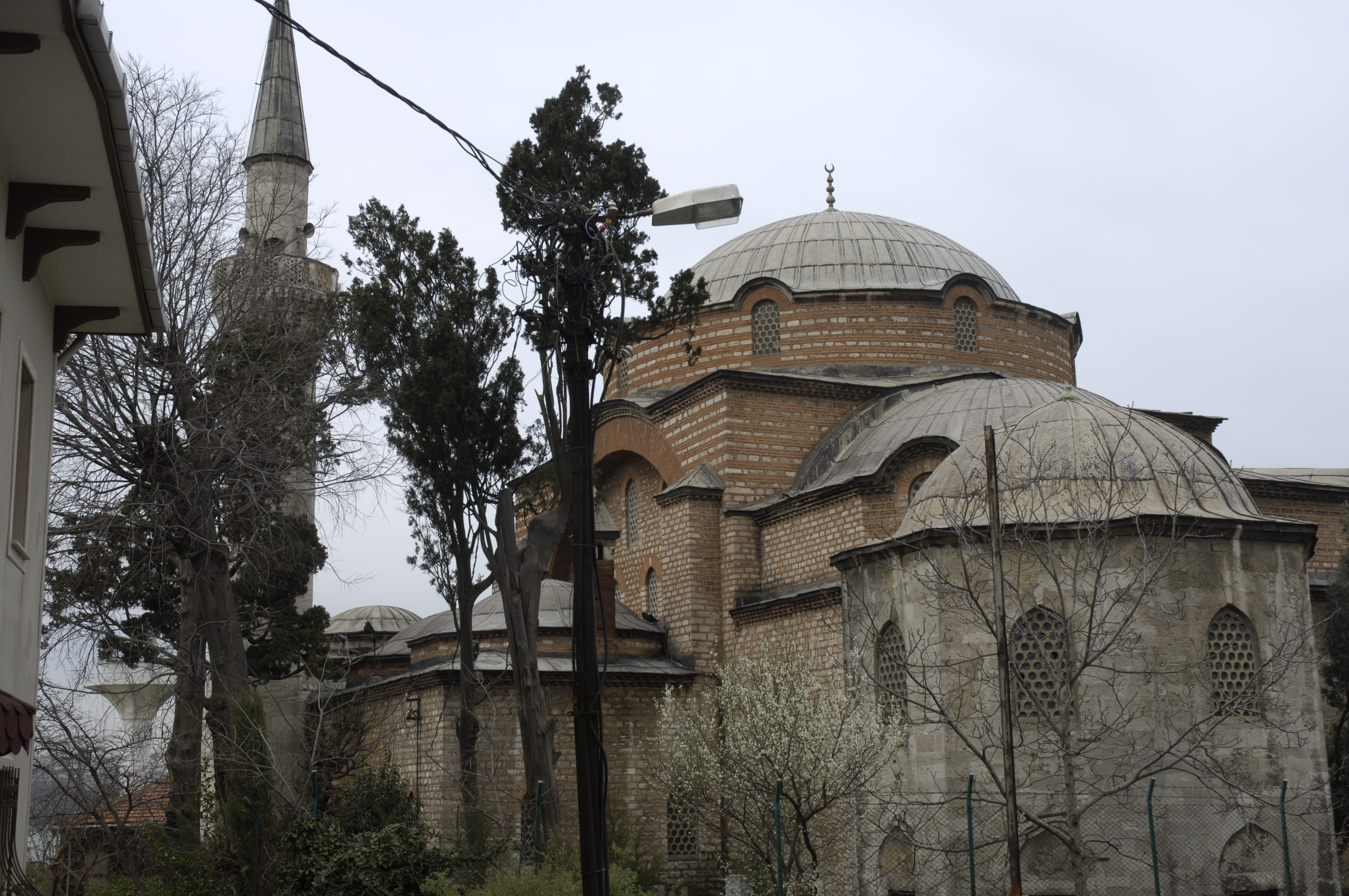
Rum Mehmed Pasha Mosque (1471–1472), with a dome and semi-dome layout

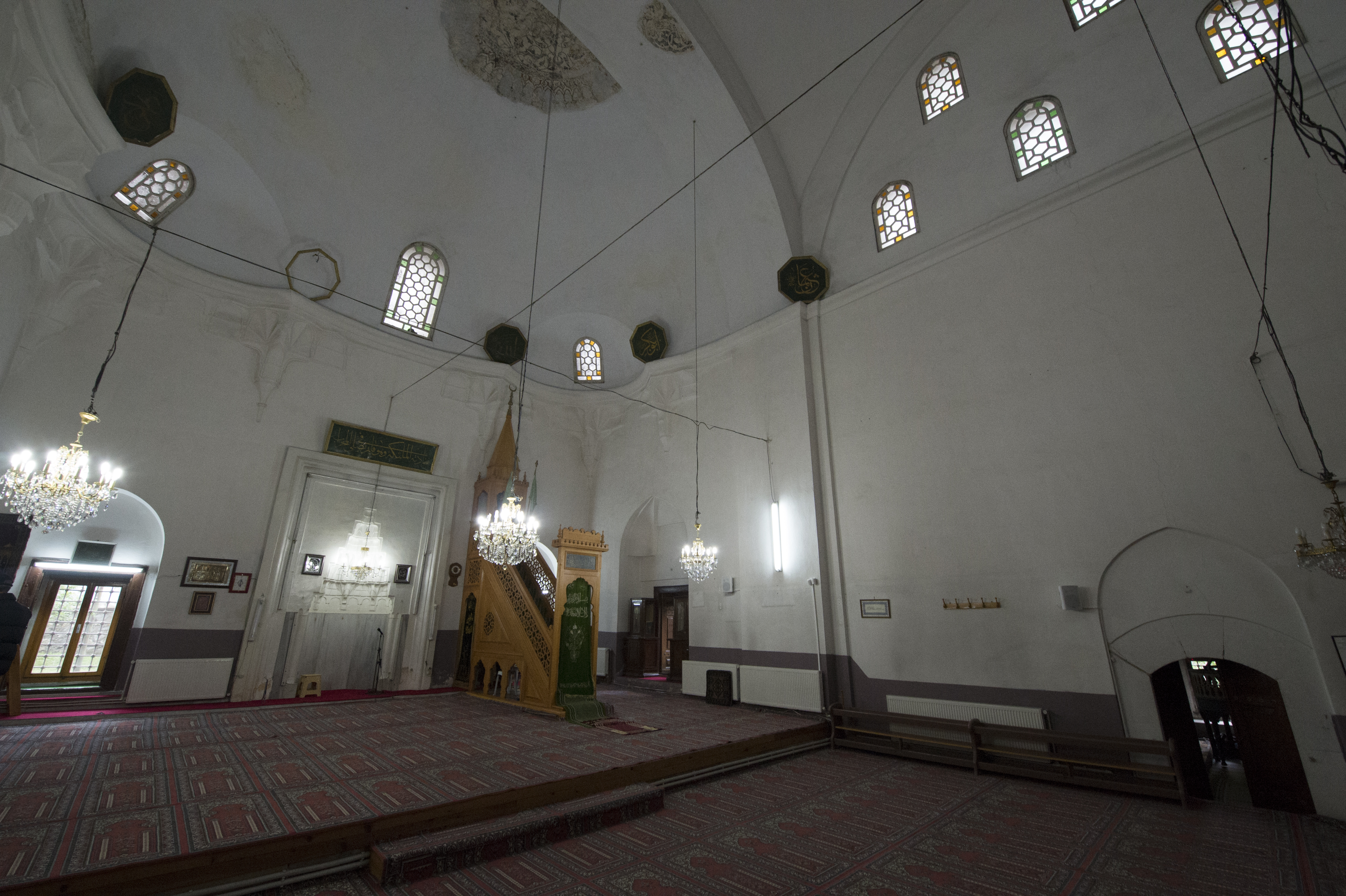
Interior of the Rum Mehmed Pasha Mosque

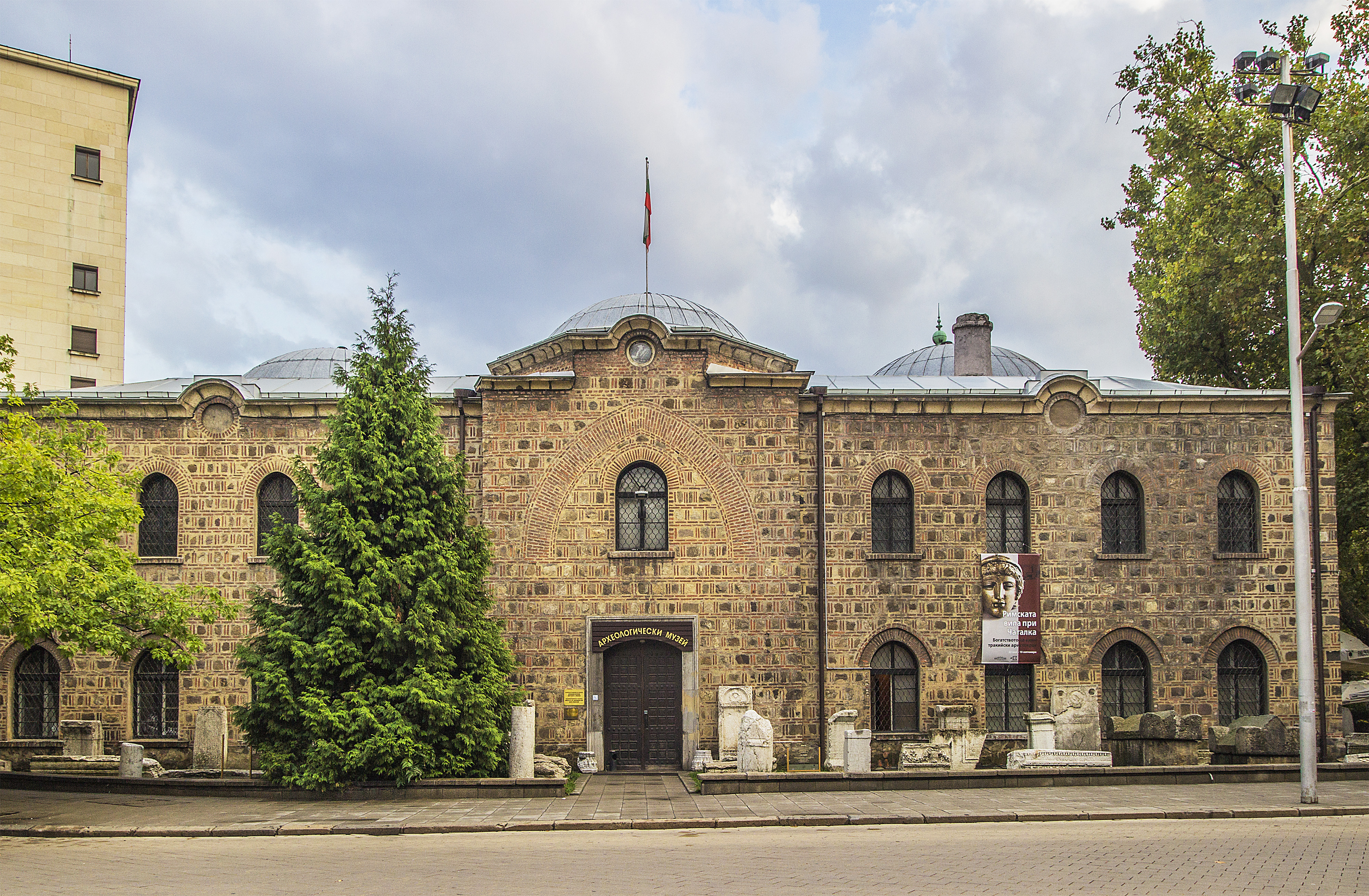
Great Mosque of Sofia (mid to late 15th century), now the National Archaeological Museum of Bulgaria

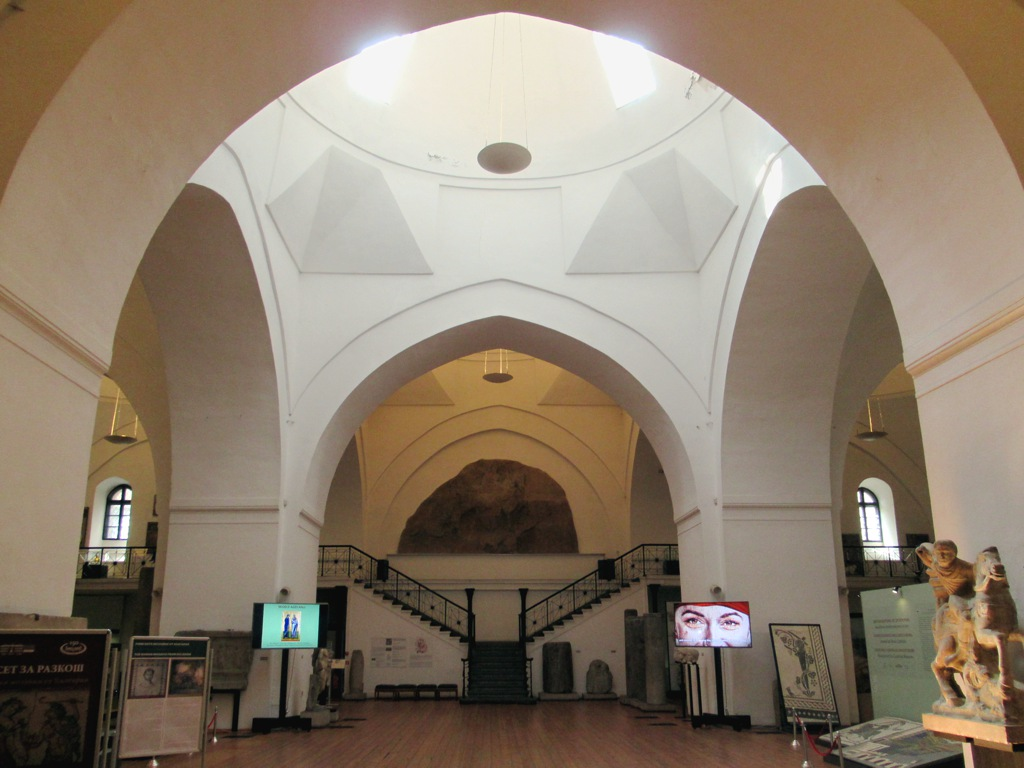
Interior of the Great Mosque of Sofia (National Archaeological Museum)

== The reign of Bayezid II ==
=== Complexes of Bayezid II ===
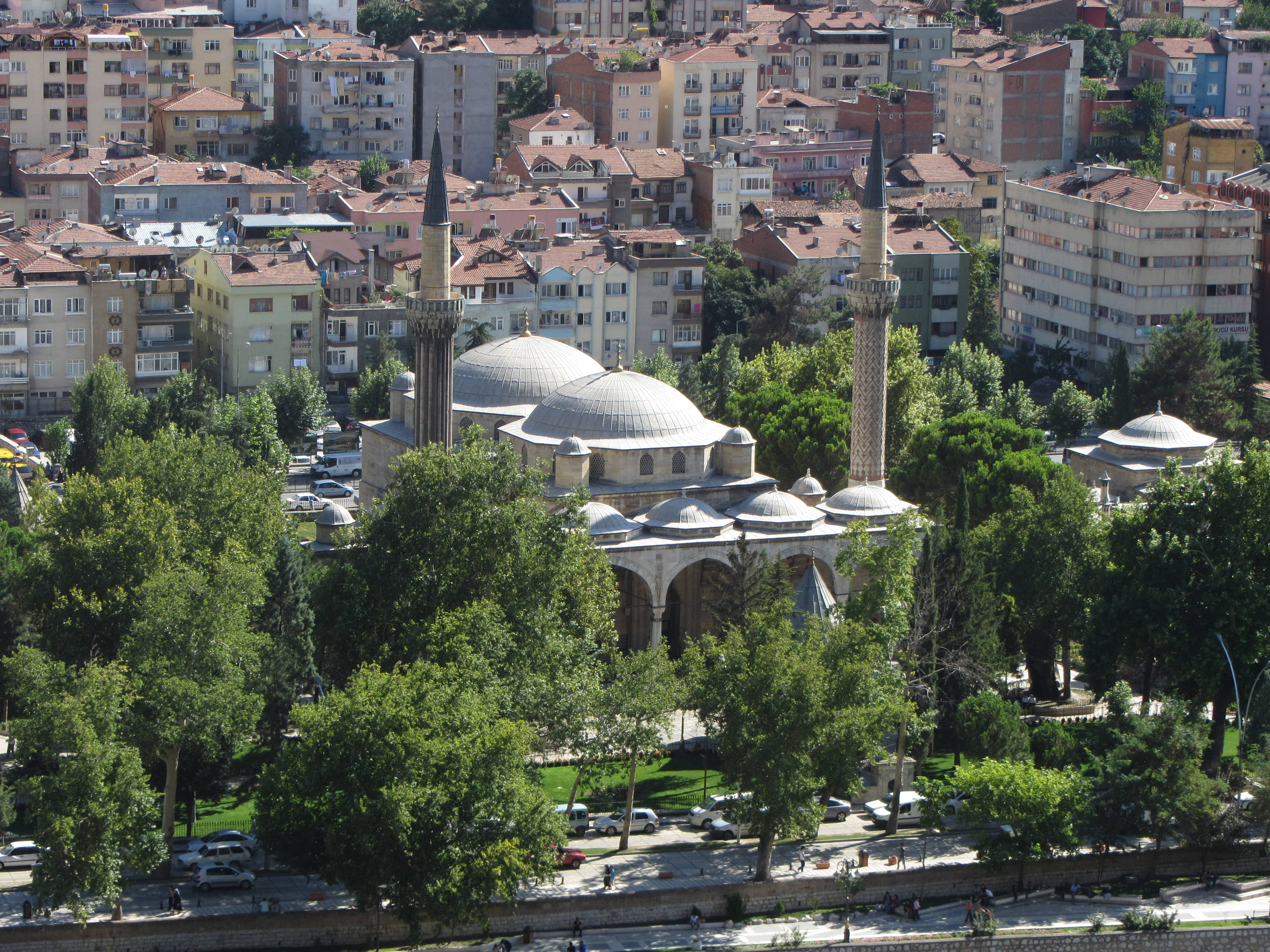
Bayezid II Mosque in Amasya (1486)

After Mehmed II, the reign of Bayezid II (1481–1512) is again marked by extensive architectural patronage, of which the two most outstanding and influential examples are the Bayezid II Complex in Edirne and the Bayezid II Mosque in Istanbul. While it was a period of further experimentation, the Mosque of Bayezid II in Amasya, completed in 1486, was still based on the Bursa-type plan, representing the last and largest imperial mosque in this style. Doğan Kuban regards the constructions of Bayzezid II as also constituting deliberate attempts at urban planning, extending the legacy of the Fatih Mosque complex in Istanbul.

The Bayezid II Complex in Edirne is a complex (külliye) of buildings including a mosque, a darüşşifa, an imaret, a madrasa, a tımarhane (asylum for the mentally ill), two tabhanes, a bakery, latrines, and other services, all linked together on the same site. It was commissioned by Bayezid II in 1484 and completed in 1488 under the direction of the architect Hayrettin. The various structures of the complex have relatively simple but strictly geometrical floor plans, built of stone with lead-covered roofs, with only sparse decoration in the form of alternating coloured stone around windows and arches. This has been described as an "Ottoman classical architectural aesthetic at an early stage in its development". The mosque lies at the heart of the complex. It has an austere square prayer hall covered by a large high dome. The hall is preceded by a rectangular courtyard with a fountain and a surrounding arcade. The darüşşifa, whose function was the main motivation behind Bayezid's construction of the complex, has two inner courtyards that lead to a structure with a hexagonal floor plan featuring small domed rooms arranged around a larger central dome.

Bayezid II complex in Edirne (1484–1488)

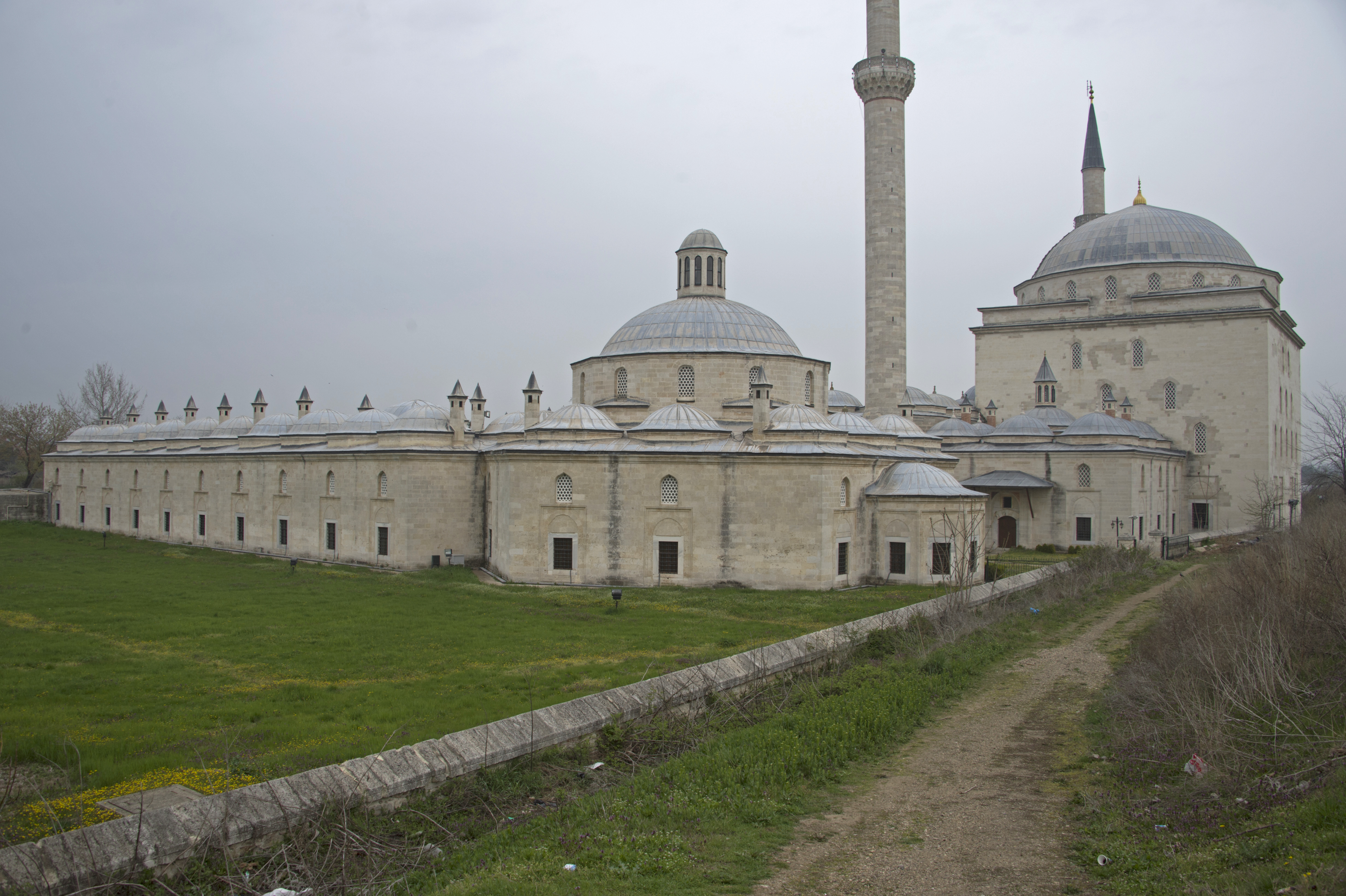
Exterior of the Bayezid II Complex in Edirne, with the mosque visible on the right

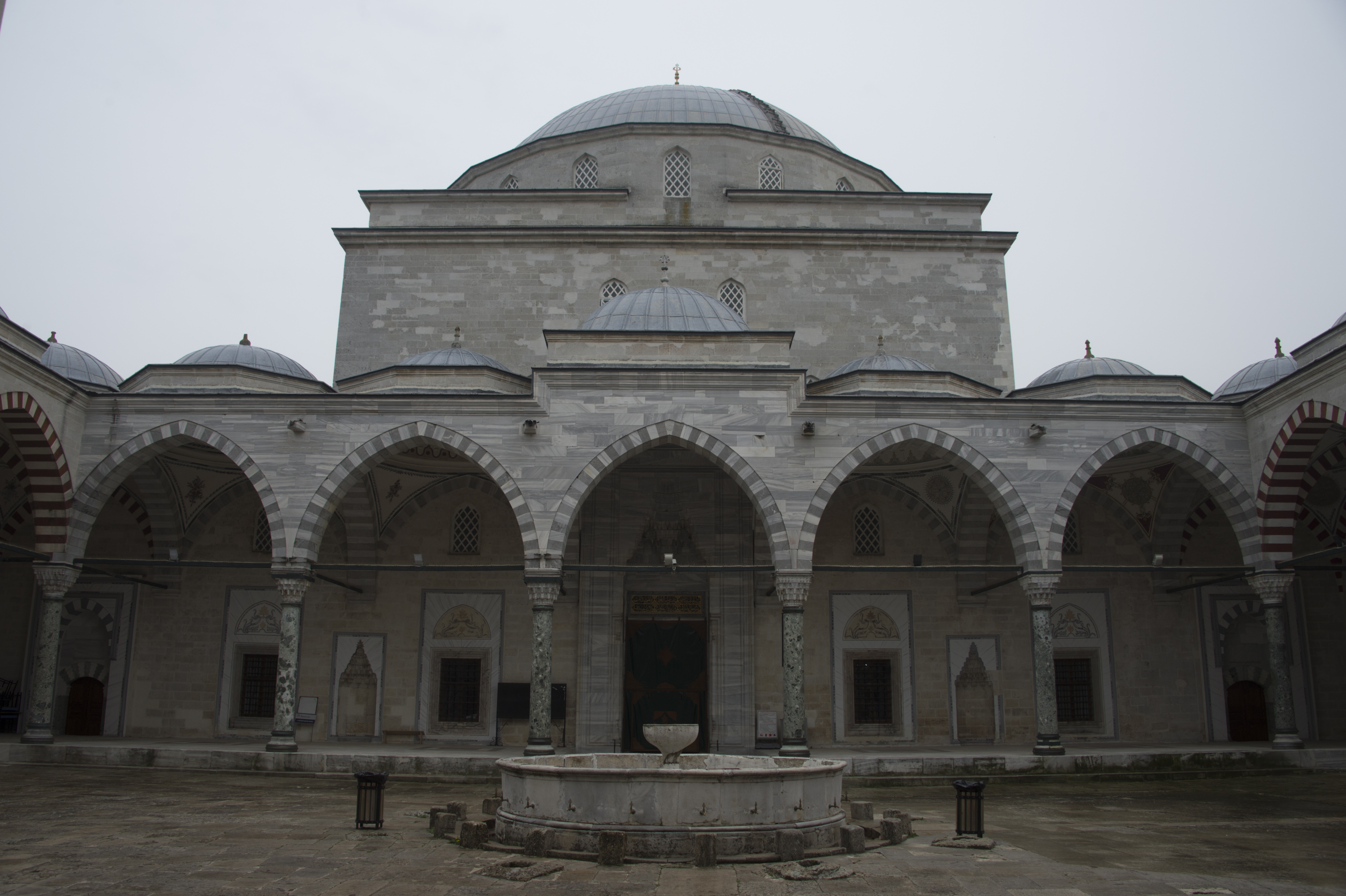
Courtyard of the mosque at the Bayezid II Complex in Edirne

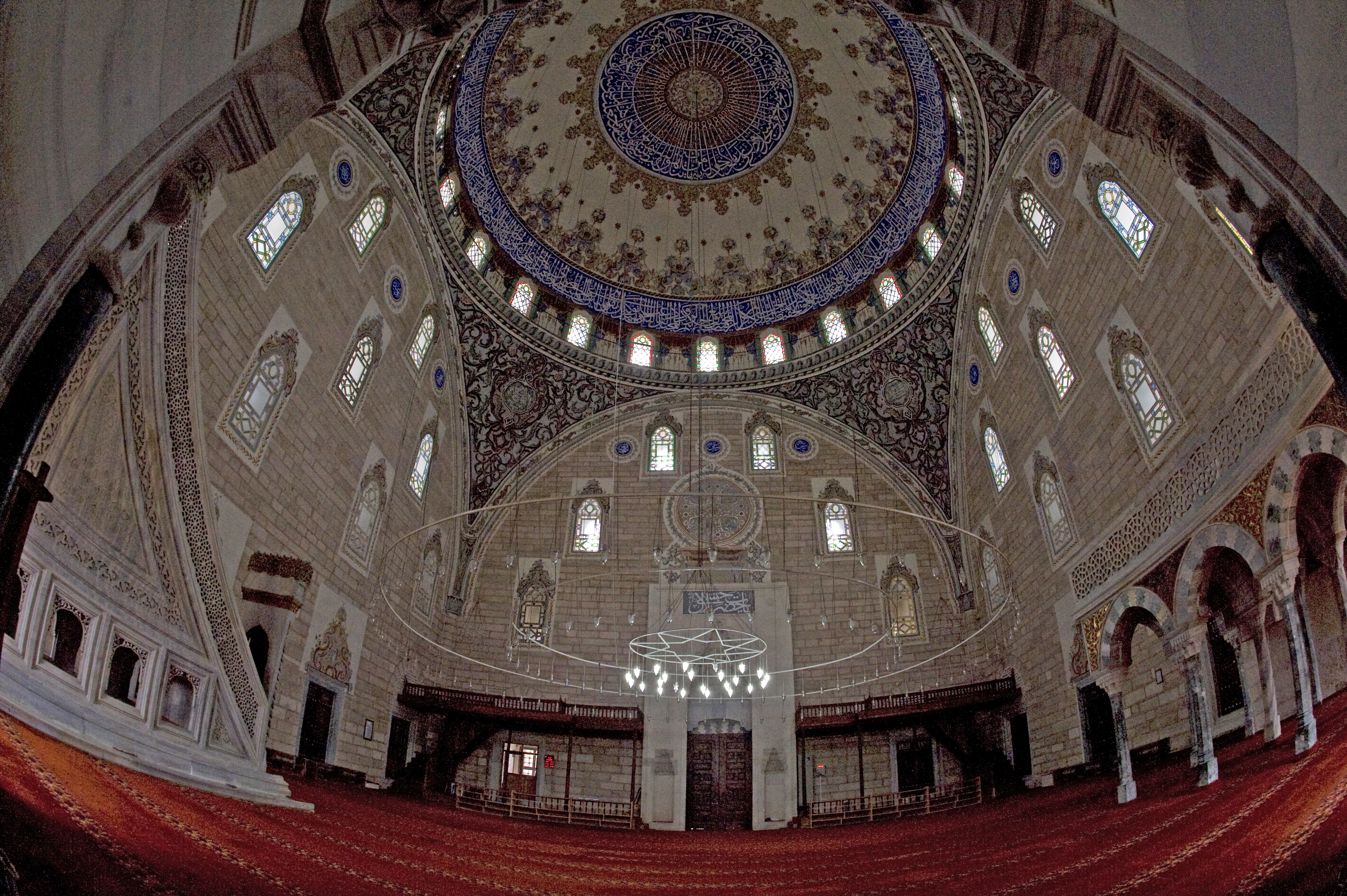
Interior of the mosque at the Bayezid II Complex in Edirne

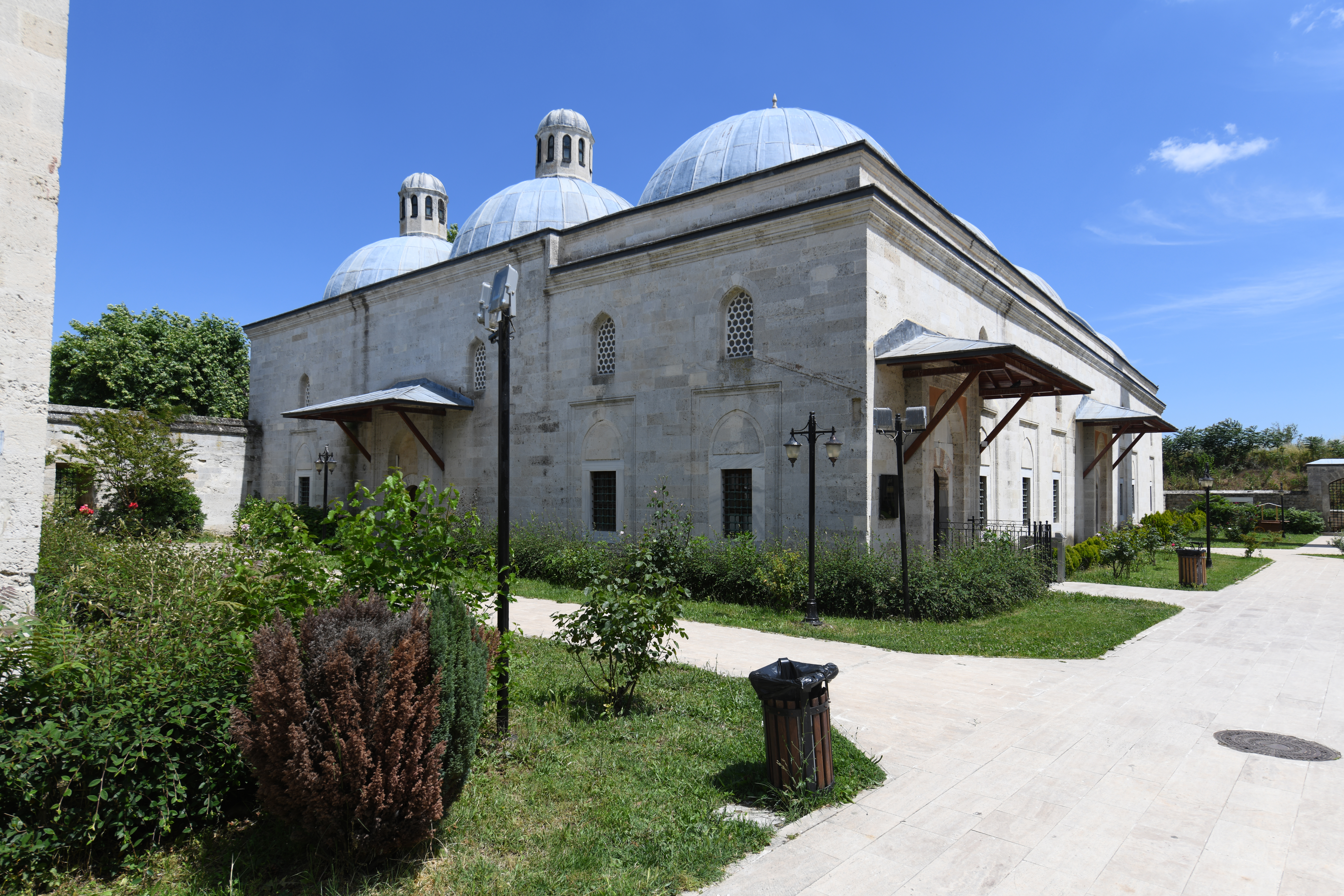
The imaret of the Bayezid II Complex in Edirne

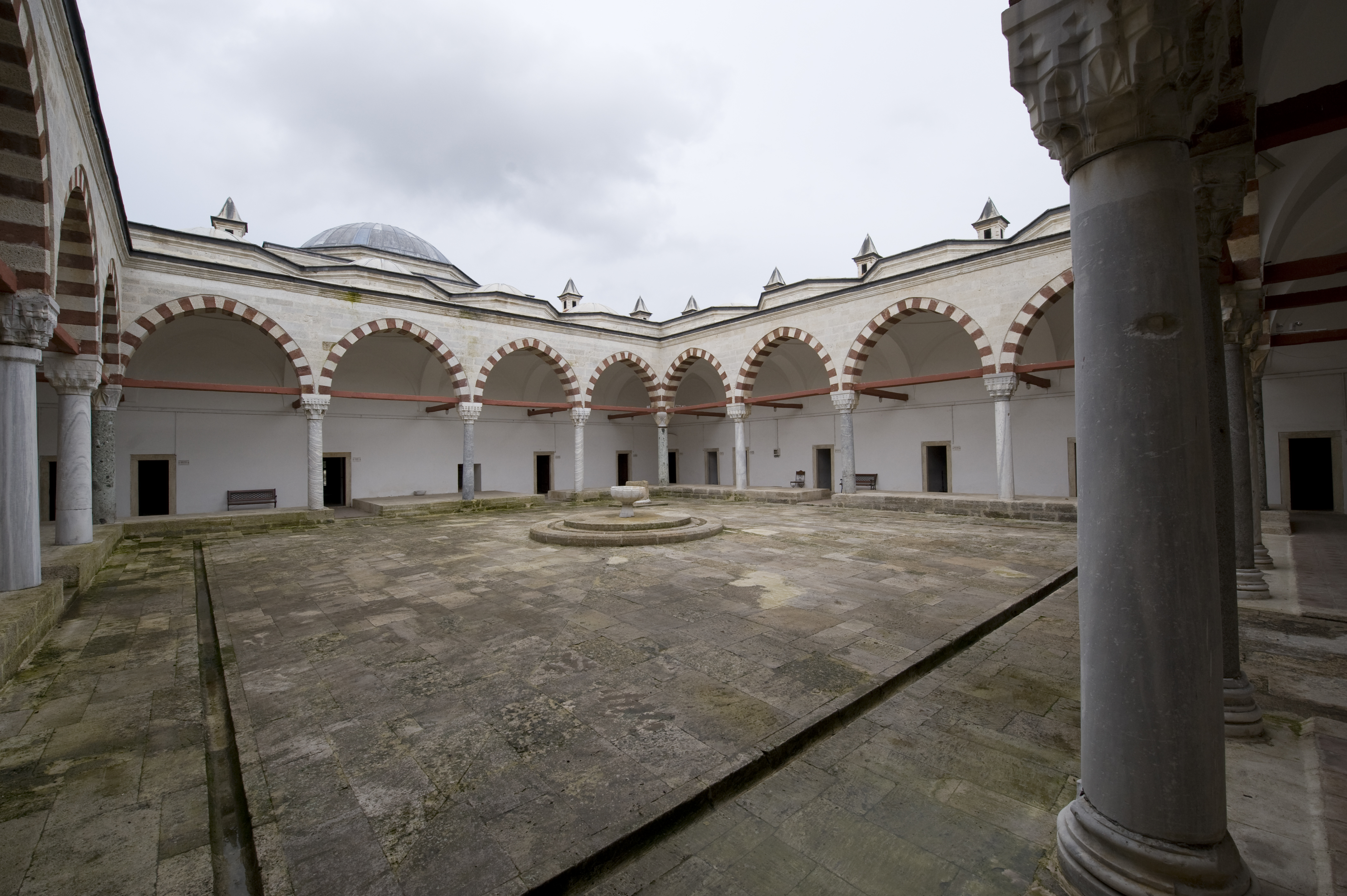
Courtyard of the medrese of the Bayezid II Complex in Edirne

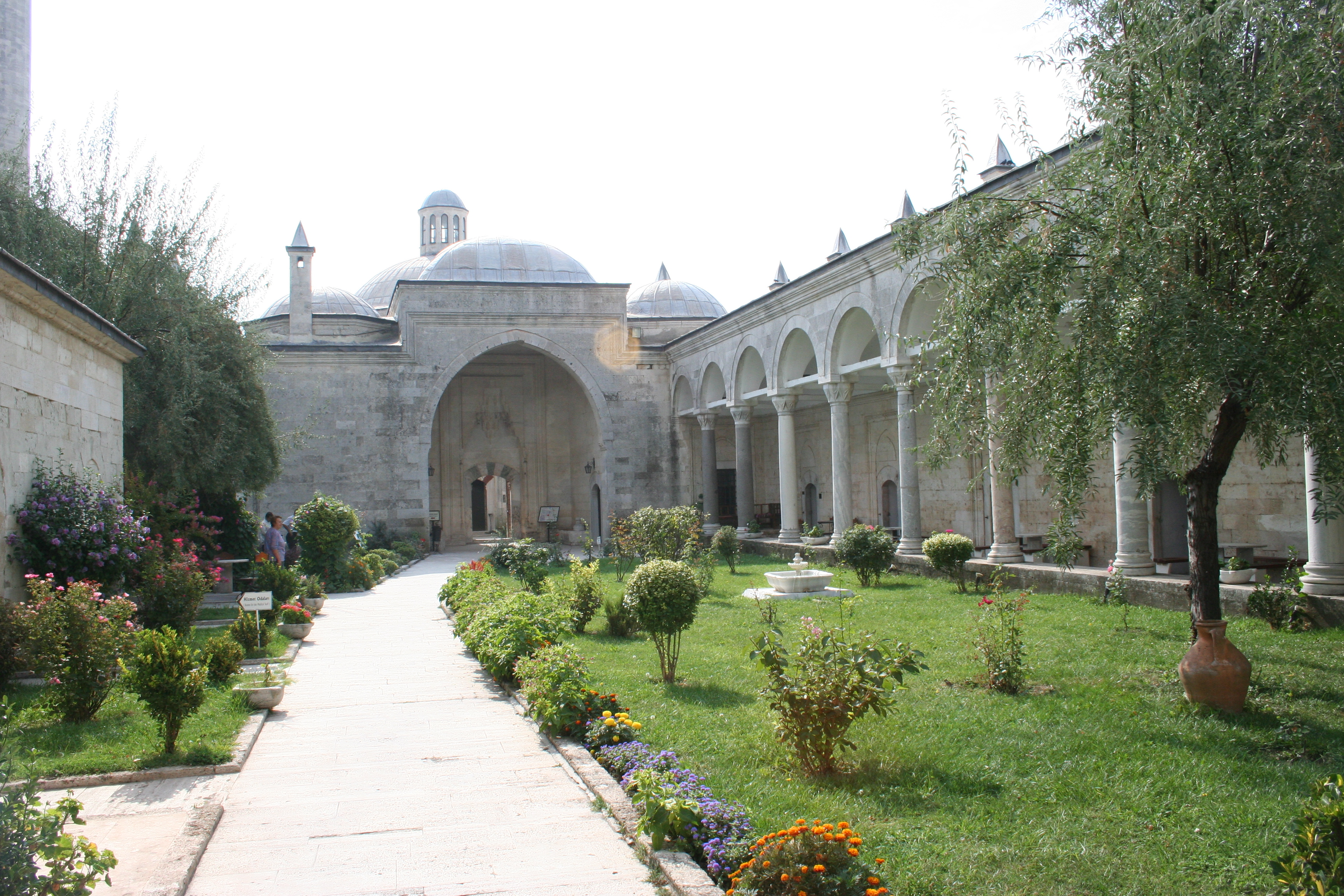
Courtyard leading into the darüşşifa of the Bayezid II Complex in Edirne

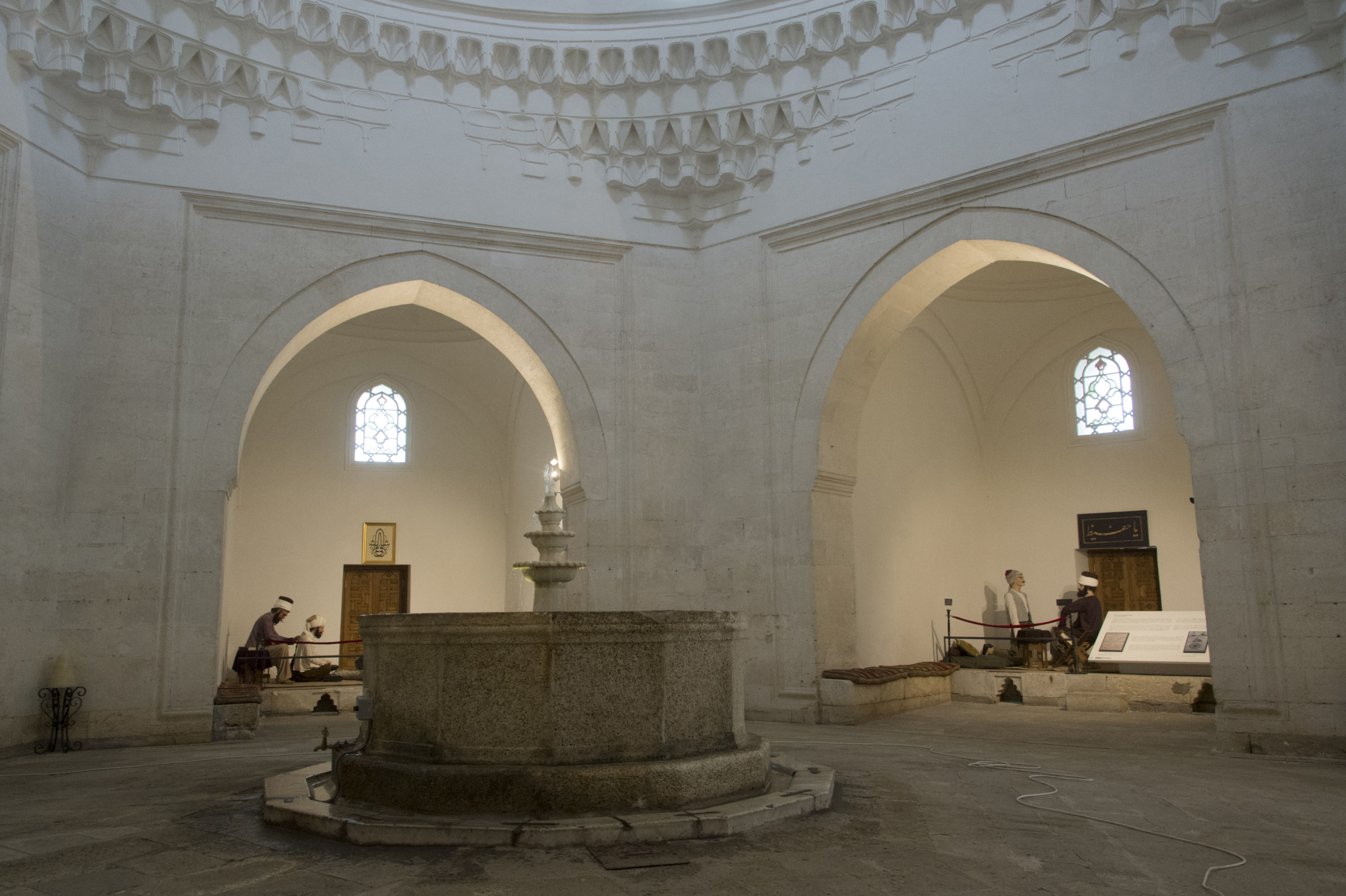
The domed hexagonal hall of the darüşşifa of the Bayezid II Complex in Edirne

The Bayezid II Mosque in Istanbul was built between 1500 and 1505 under the direction of the architect Ya'qub or Yakubshah (although Hayrettin is also mentioned in documents). It too was part of a larger complex, which included a madrasa (serving today as a Museum of Turkish Calligraphy Art), a monumental hammam (the Bayezid II Hamam), hospices, an imaret, a caravanserai, and a cemetery around the sultan's mausoleum. The mosque itself, the largest building, once again consists of a courtyard leading to the square prayer hall. However, the prayer hall now makes use of two semi-domes aligned with the main central dome, while the side aisles are each covered by four smaller domes. Compared to earlier mosques, this results in a much more sophisticated "cascade of domes" effect for the building's exterior profile, likely reflecting influences from the Hagia Sophia and the original (now disappeared) Fatih Mosque. The courtyard is also considered one of the finest courtyards in Ottoman mosque architecture. The mosque is the culmination of this period of architectural exploration under Bayezid II and the last step towards the classical Ottoman style. The deliberate arrangement of established Ottoman architectural elements into a strongly symmetrical design is one aspect which denotes this evolution.

Bayezid II complex in Istanbul (1500–1505)

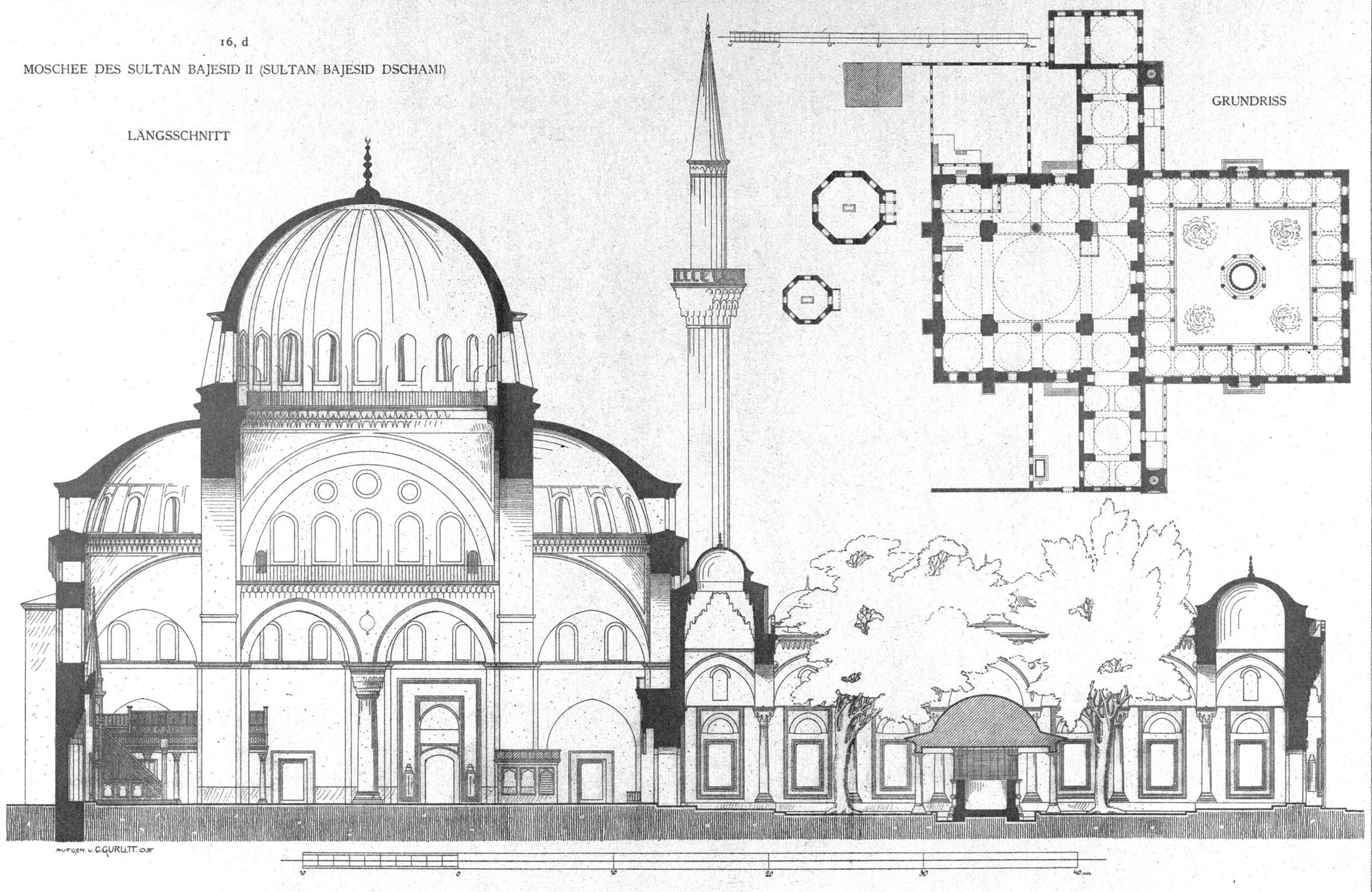
Floor plan and elevation of the Bayezid II Mosque in Istanbul (from drawings by Cornelius Gurlitt)

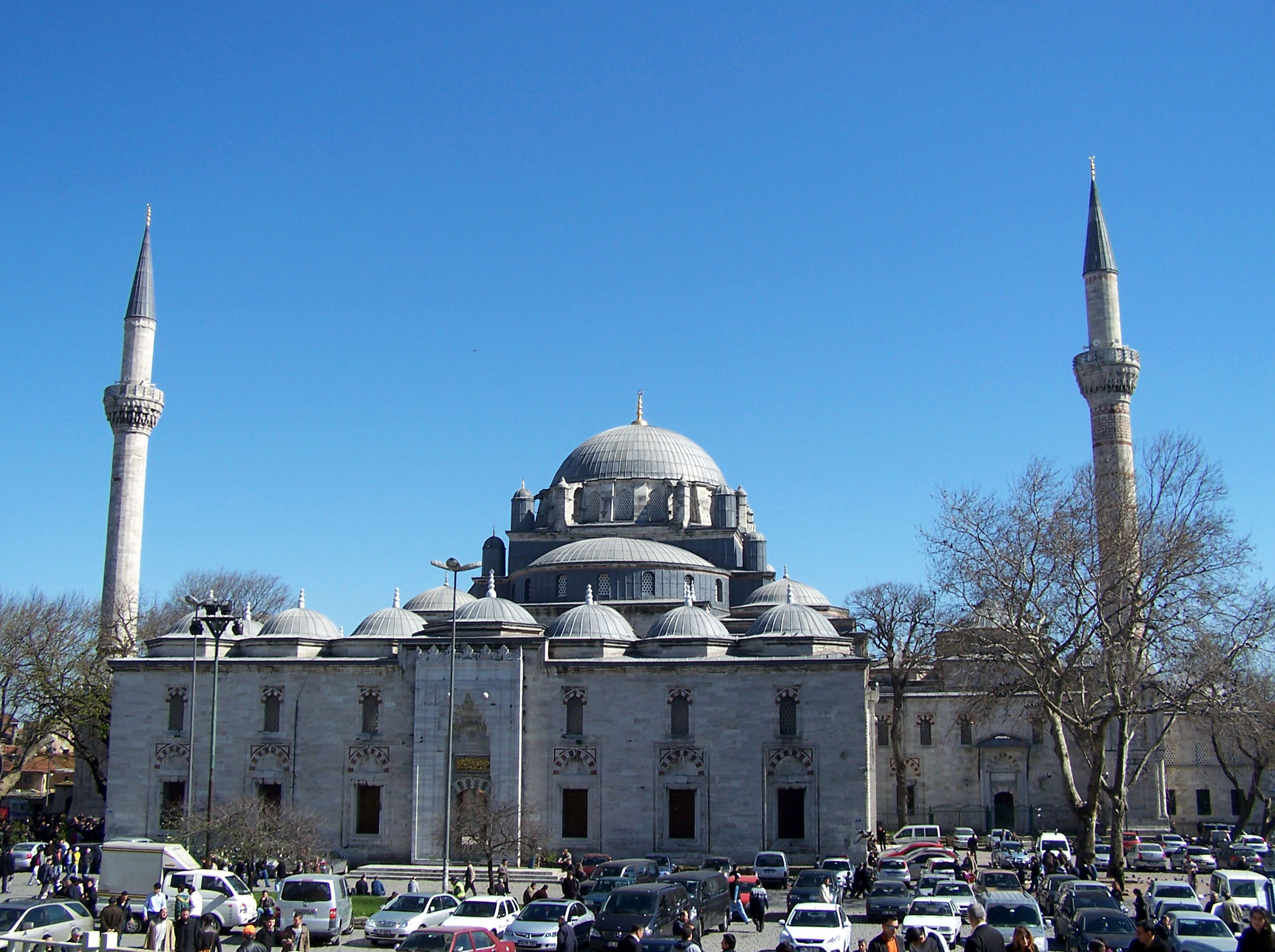
Exterior of the Bayezid II Mosque in Istanbul

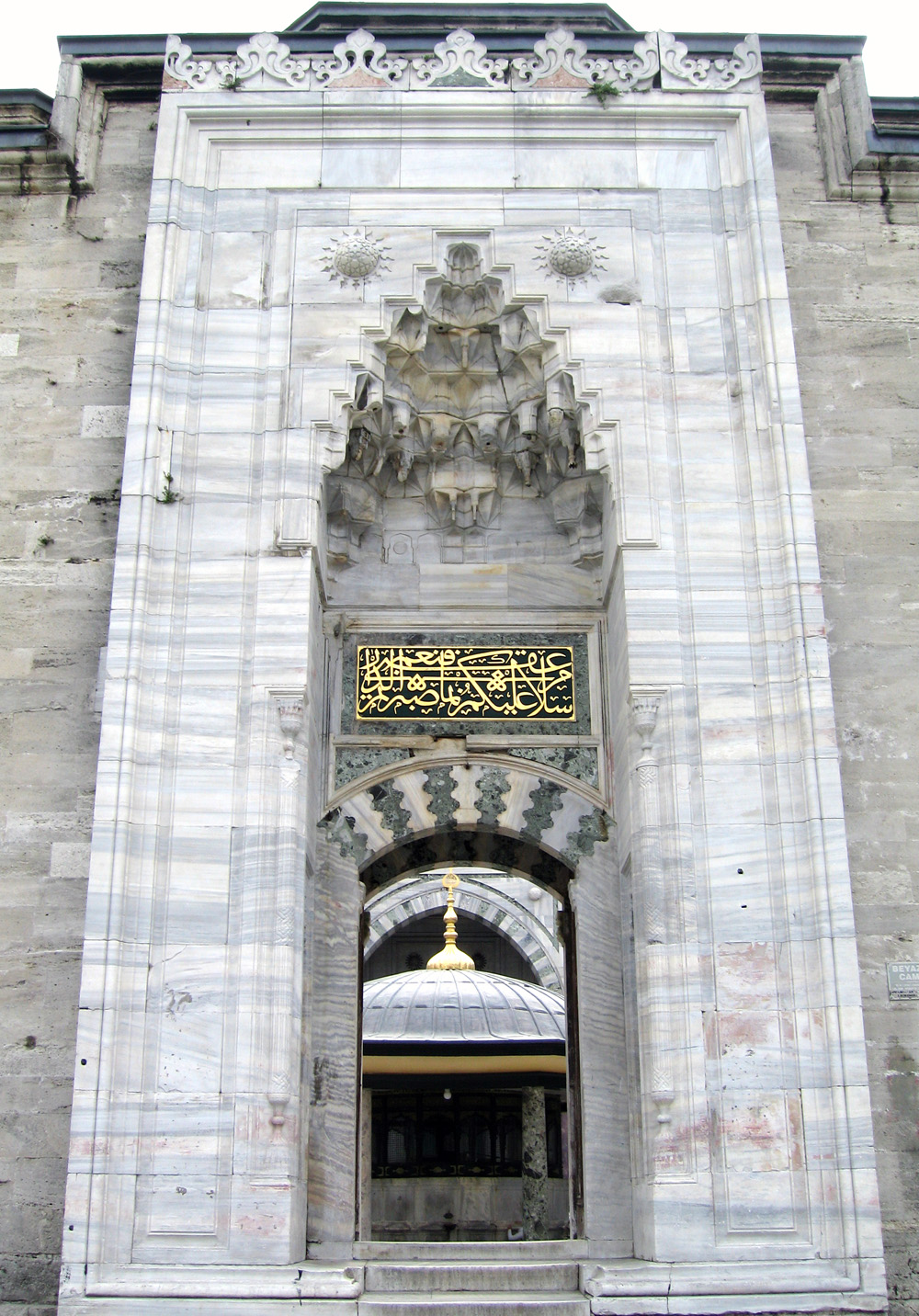
Front gate of the Bayezid II Mosque in Istanbul

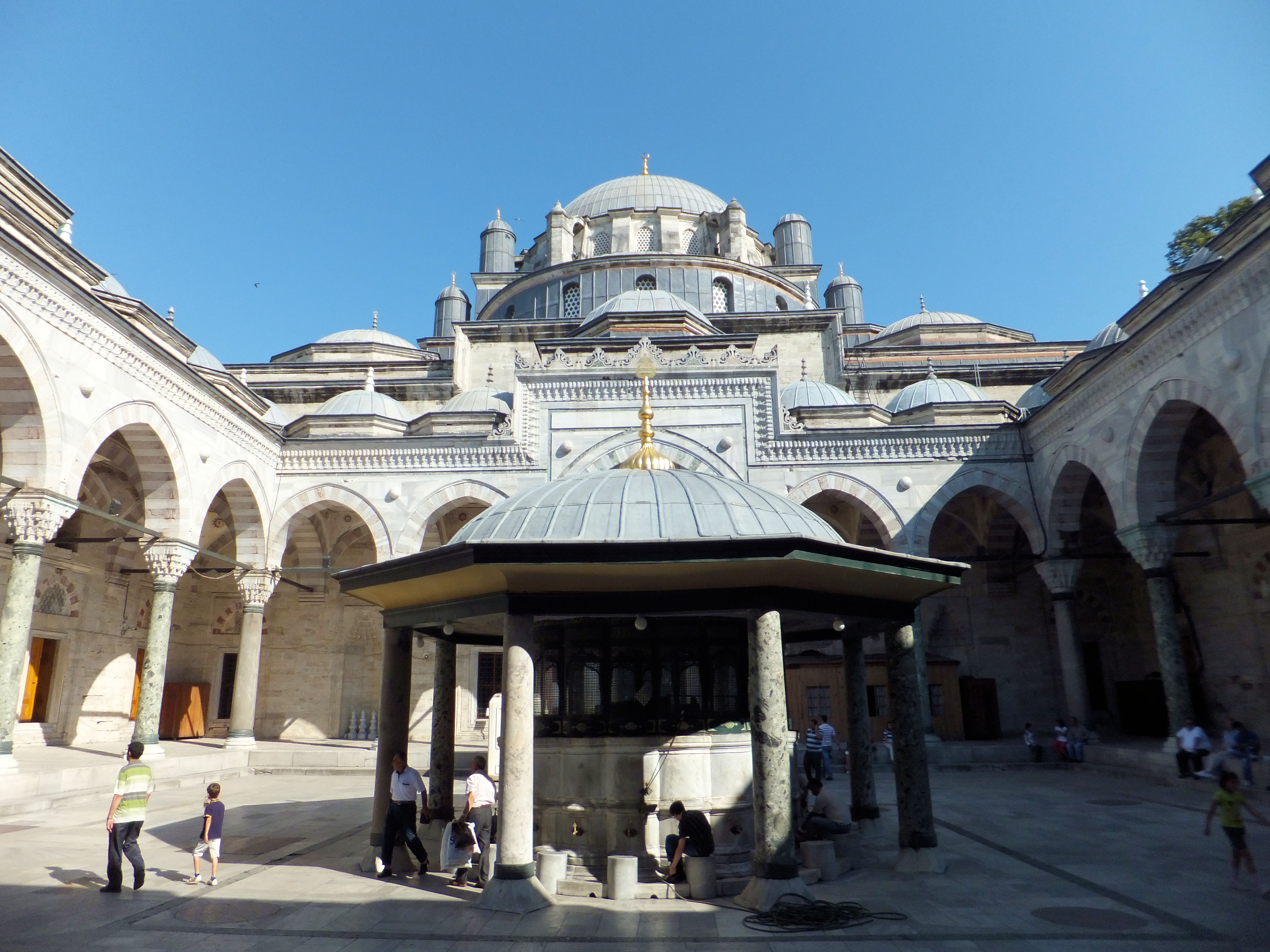
Courtyard of the Bayezid II Mosque in Istanbul

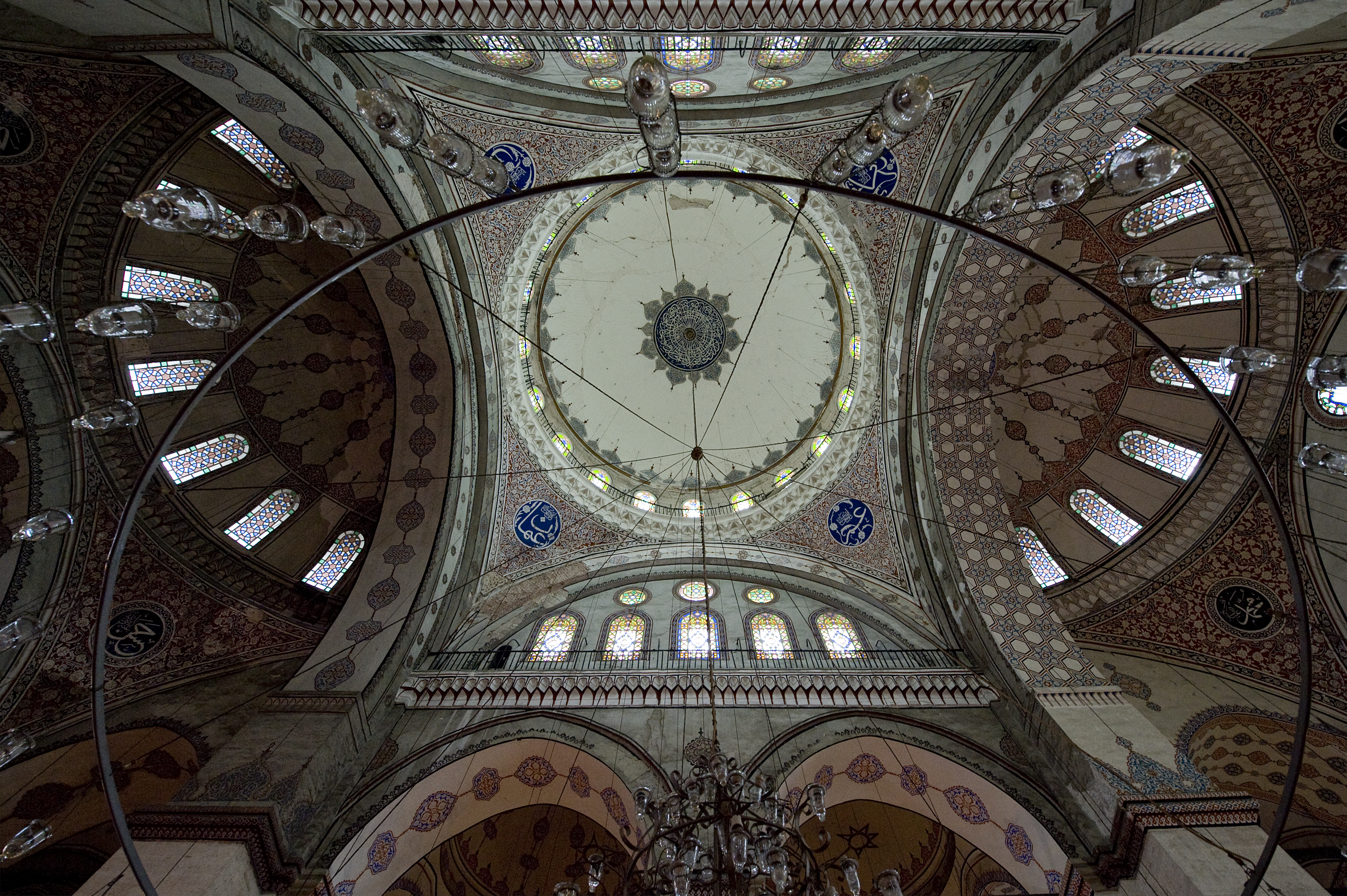
Bayezid II Mosque in Istanbul: dome interiors

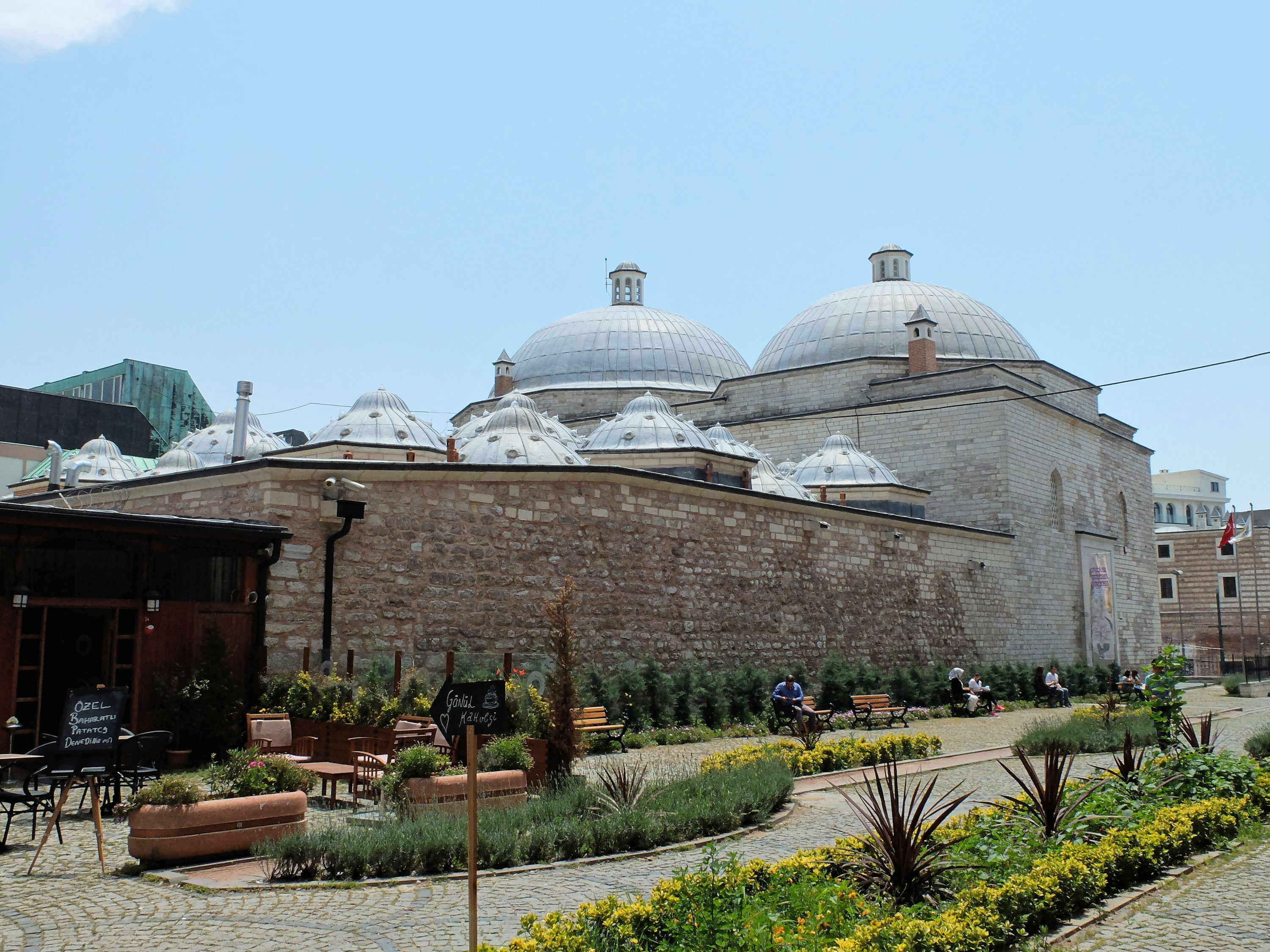
Bayezid II Hamam, part of the Bayezid II complex in Istanbul

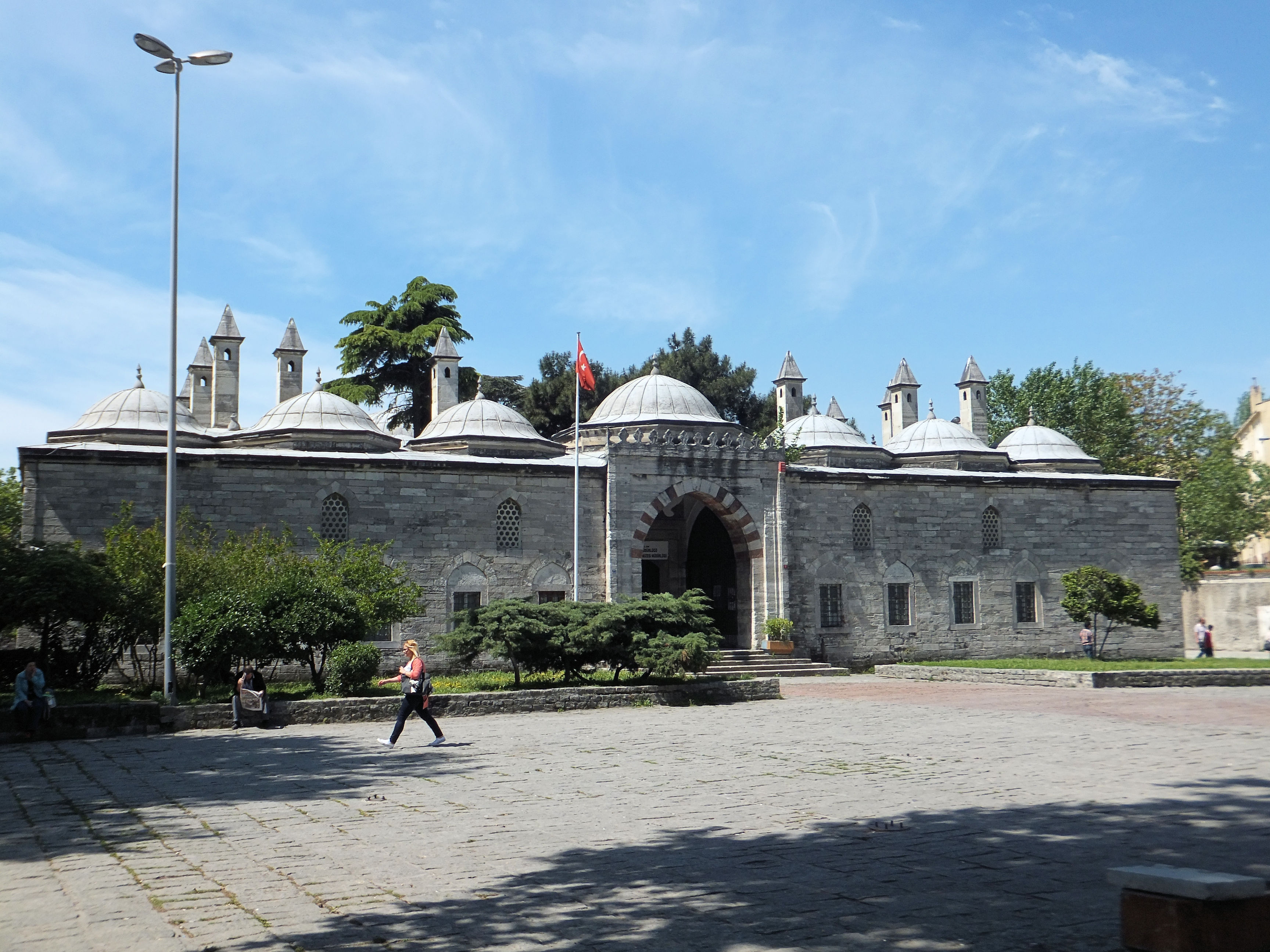
Bayezid II Medrese, part of the Bayezid II complex in Istanbul (currently the Museum of Turkish Calligraphy Art)

=== Complexes of Bayezid II's family and viziers ===
Bayezid II's family, viziers, and high officials also built many monuments during his reign, and Bayezid himself also built other types of structures. In Bursa's central commercial district he ordered the construction of a large caravanserai in 1490–1491, now known as Koza Han. It consists of a square courtyard surrounded by a two story arched gallery, with a small octagonal mosque (mescit) standing on raised pillars in its center. In Amasya, a high-ranking official named Hüseyin Agha built the city's bedesten in 1483 (partly demolished in the 19th century) and the Kapıağa Medrese (or Büyük Ağa Medrese) in 1489. The madrasa is the only one in Anatolia to have an octagonal floor plan and its design principles appear similar to the darüşşifa of Bayezid's complex in Edirne, though it is unclear if the architects were related. Hüseyin Agha also sponsored the conversion of the Byzantine Sergius and Bacchus Church in Istanbul into the Küçük Aya Sofya (Little Hagia Sophia) Mosque circa 1500. Some mosque complexes were sponsored by Bayezid's female family members or by Bayezid himself in their honour, including the Hatuniye Mosque in Manisa (1489 or 1490–1491) for Hüsnüşah Hatun (his wife) and the Hatuniye Mosque in Tokat (1485 or before 1493) for Gülbahar Hatun (his mother). In Istanbul, the Firuz Ağa Mosque, near the Hippodrome, dates from 1491. It is small and simple, consisting of a square chamber covered by a single dome, but its design set an example for many later small mosques in the city.

Also in Istanbul, the Davud Pasha complex, completed in 1485, was built by Davud Pasha, one of Bayezid's grand viziers. It includes a mosque, a madrasa, an imaret, a mektep, and the founder's tomb. The mosque bears similarities to the earlier Mosque of Bayezid I in Murdurnu, consisting of a large single-domed chamber with heavy muqarnas-decorated squinches. Pairs of small domed chambers attached to the sides of the building were used as tabhanes. The Atik Ali Pasha Mosque complex, dated to 1496–97, was built by another grand vizier, Hadım Ali Pasha. It has a layout similar to the earlier Rum Mehmed Pasha Mosque and to the overall design of the first Fatih Mosque. The same vizier also built a bedesten in Yanbolu (Yambol in present-day Bulgaria) at the beginning of the 16th century. In Thessaloniki, one of the largest mosques in the city, the Alaca Imaret Mosque or Ishak Pasha Mosque, was completed in 1485 by Ishak Pasha. It has a form similar to the Mosque of Murad Pasha in Istanbul, with a two-domed rectangular prayer hall and smaller domed side chambers.

A couple of noteworthy hammams were built in Skopje in the mid-to-late 15th century (under either Mehmed II or Bayezid II) by local Ottoman officials, though their exact dates of construction are not known. (Both are now used by the National Gallery of North Macedonia.) The Davud Pasha (or Daut Pasha) Hamam, the largest one in the city, was built possibly in the 1470s or before 1497 by Davud Pasha (the same who built the complex in Istanbul). It consists of a double hammam with the men's and women's sections arranged side-by-side. Two equally large domed chambers served as the changing rooms which then lead into the bathing sections (warm and hot rooms), with the men's section being slightly larger than the women's. Each of the domed chambers features stucco muqarnas decoration, which demonstrates that architectural techniques in Edirne spread to other parts of the Balkans during this period. Attached to the men's section is also a separate domed room known as an usturalık (shaving room), which was not a common feature in other hammams. The Çifte Hamam, believed to have been built in the mid-15th century, is an elongated double hammam and the second-largest in the city. The men's and women's changing rooms are situated at opposite ends of the complex while the hot rooms are located in the middle.

Other structures of Bayezid II's reign (or late 15th century)

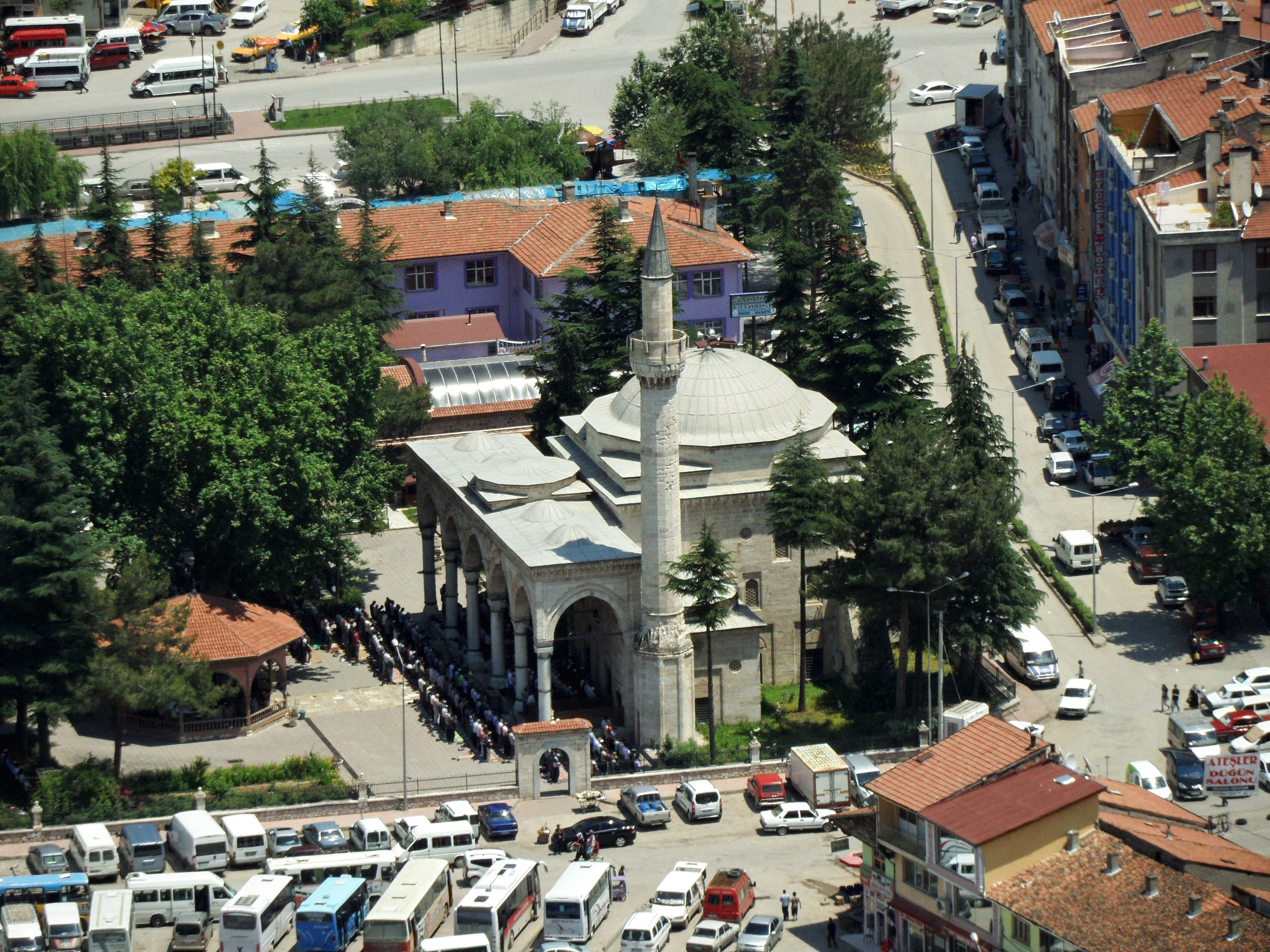
Hatuniye Mosque in Tokat (circa 1485)

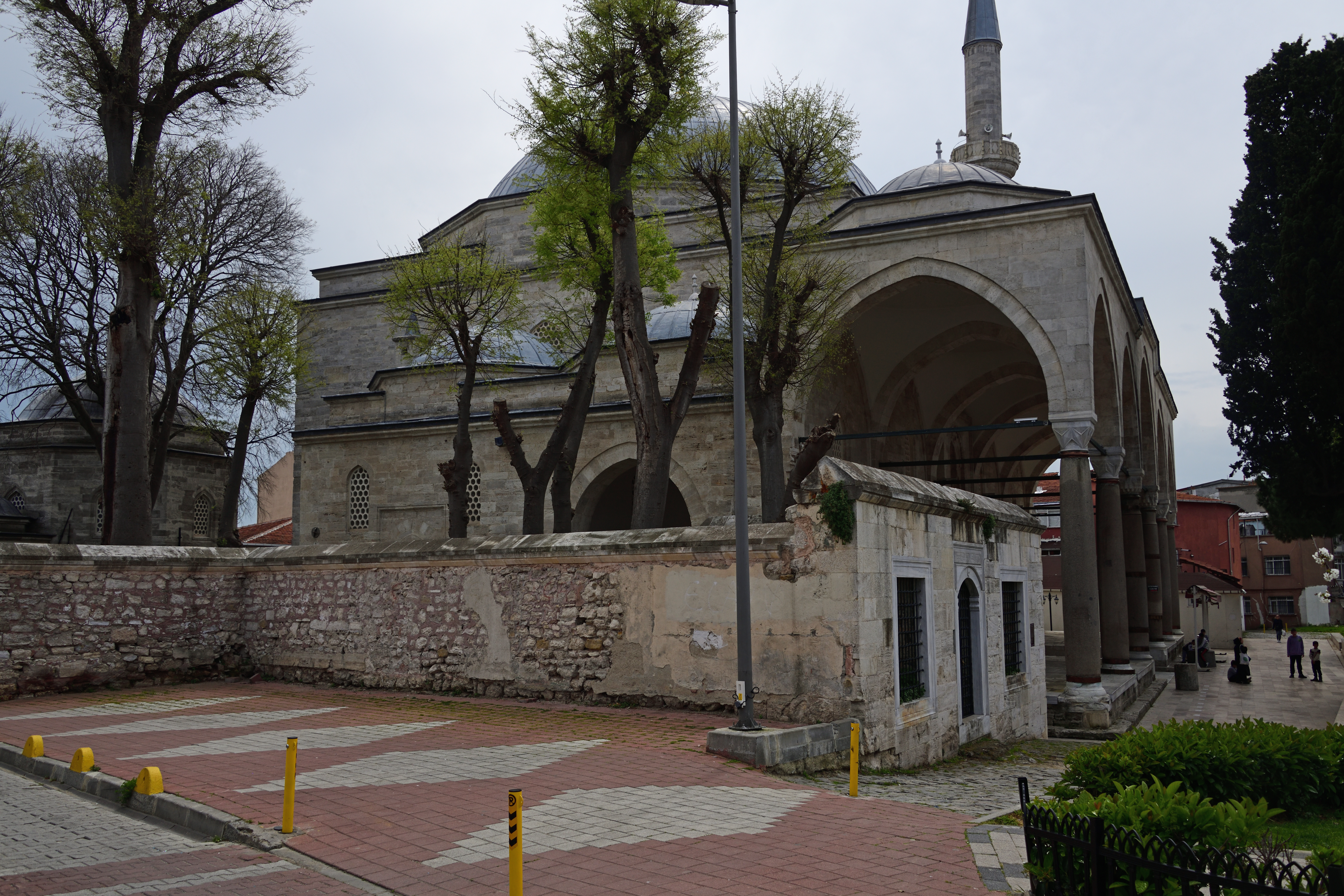
Davud Pasha Mosque in Istanbul (1485)

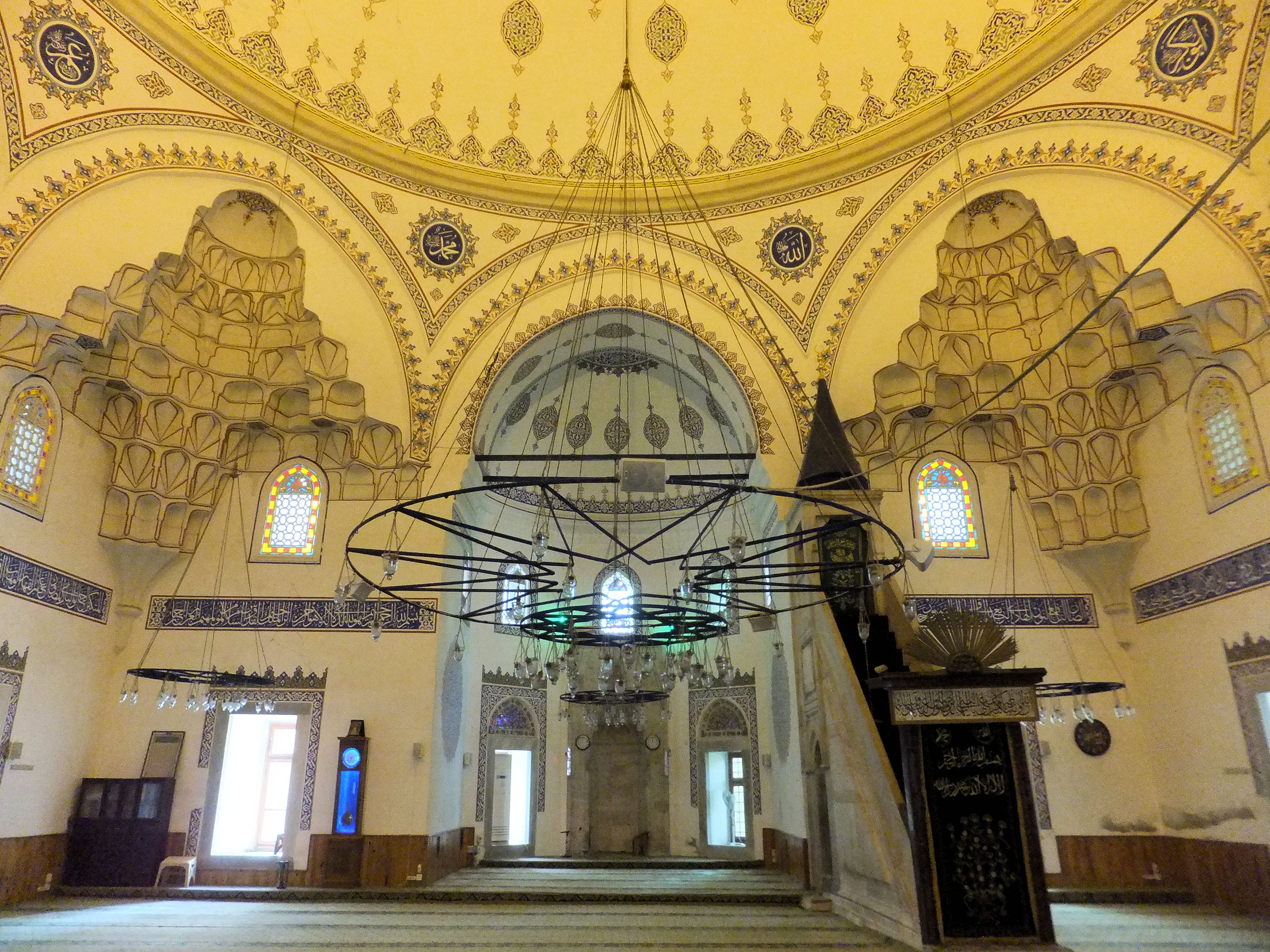
Interior of Davud Pasha Mosque

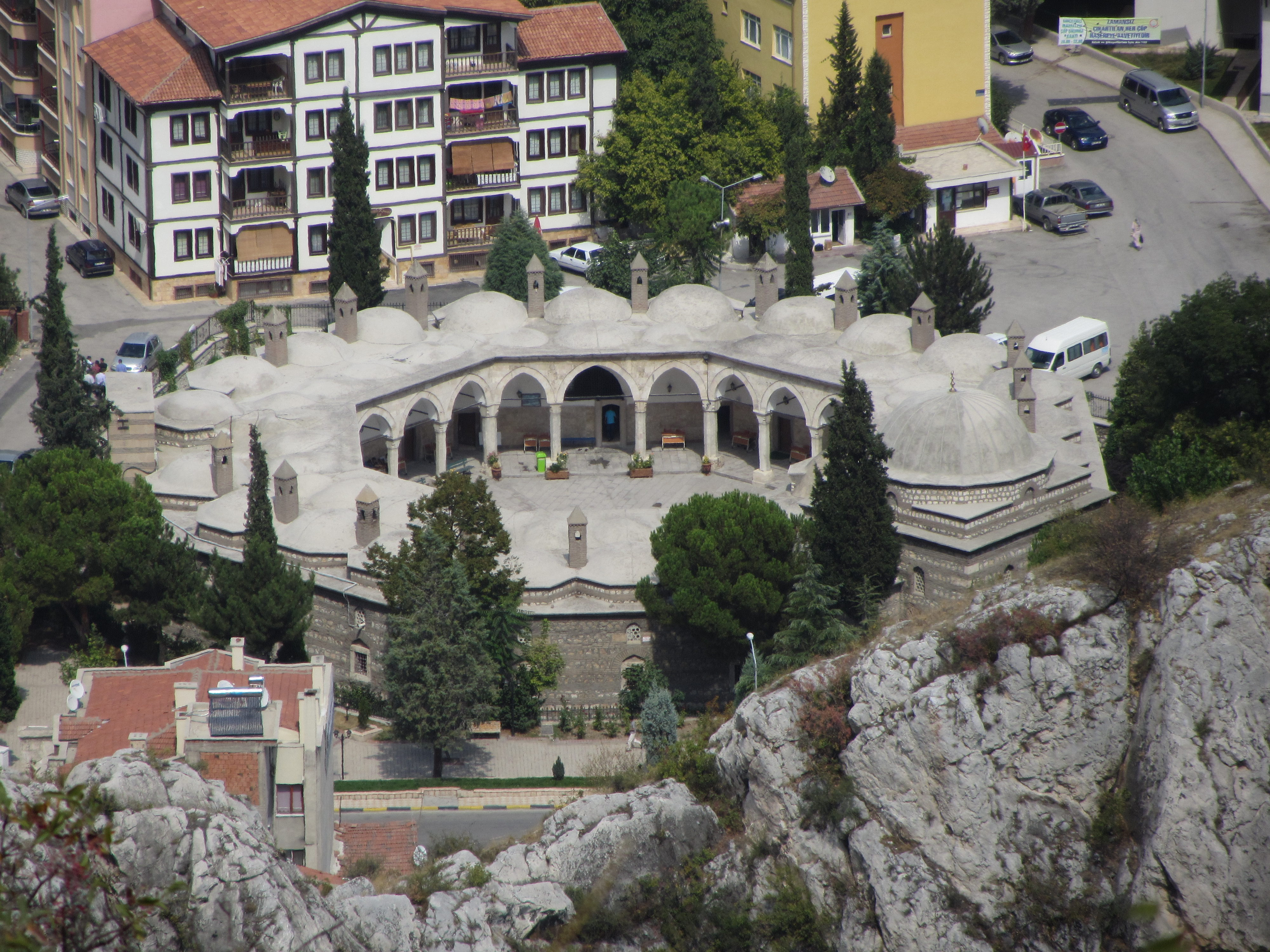
Kapıağa Medrese in Amasya (1489)

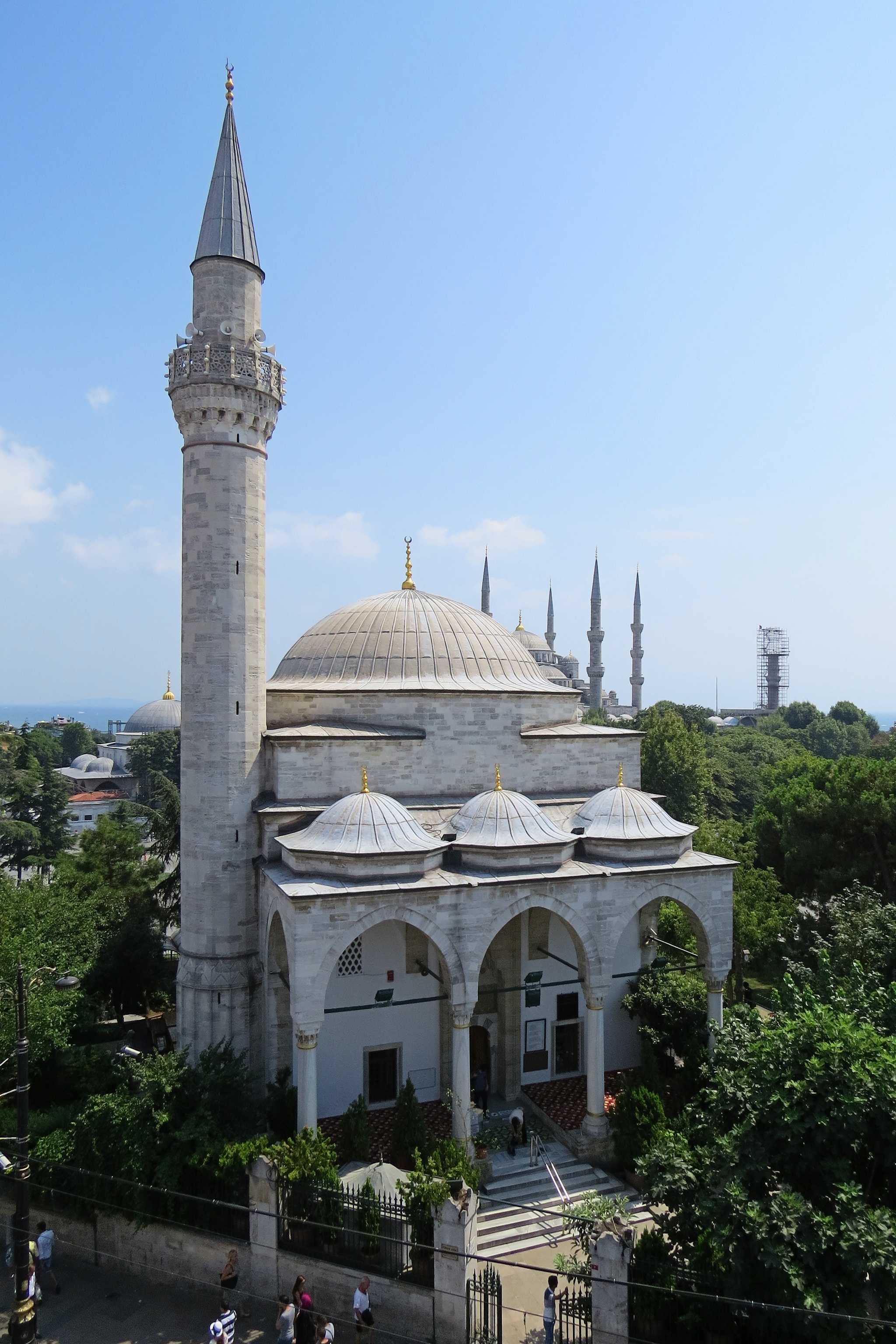
Firuz Ağa Mosque, Istanbul (circa 1490)

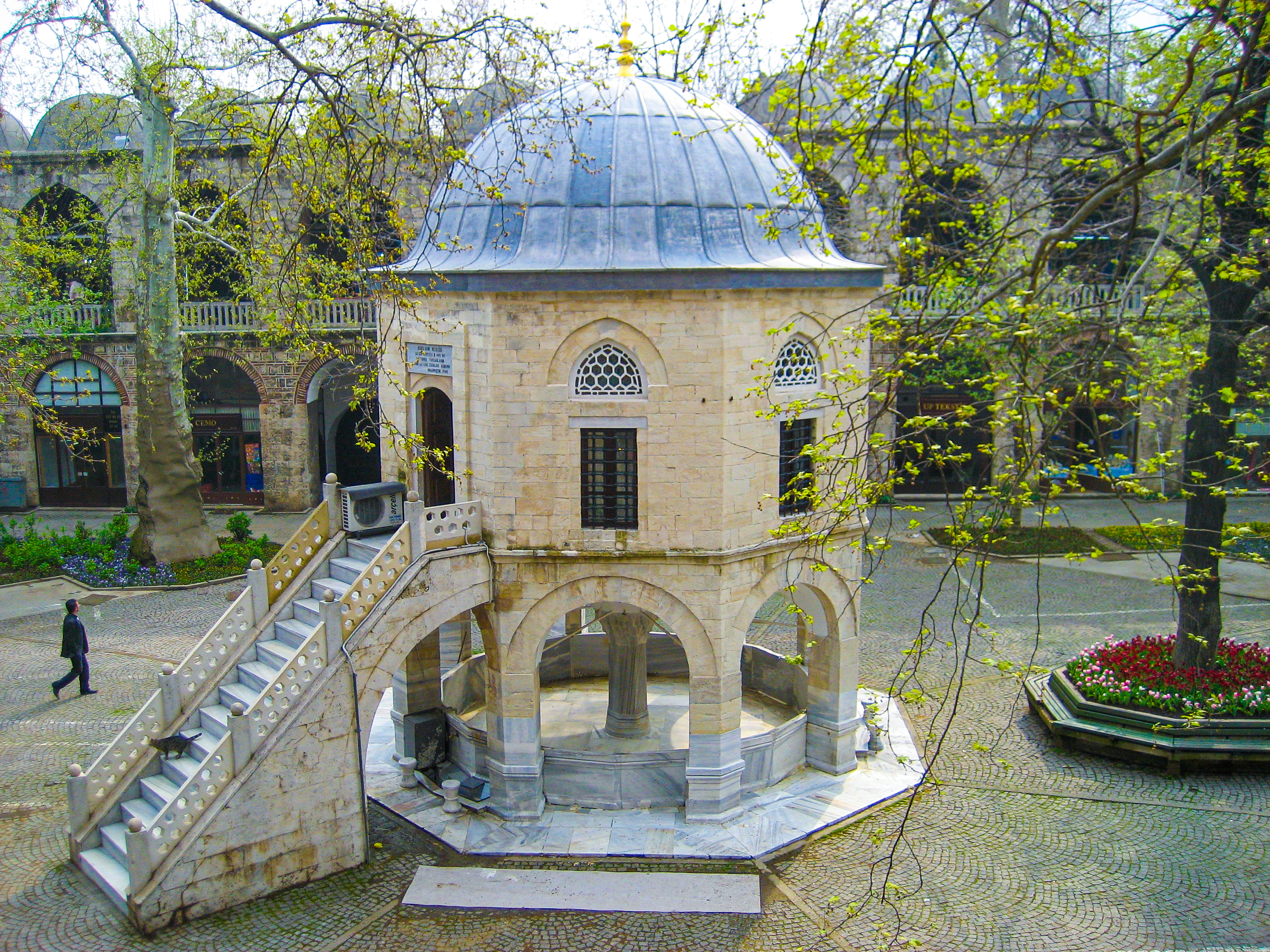
Koza Han caravanserai in Bursa (circa 1491)

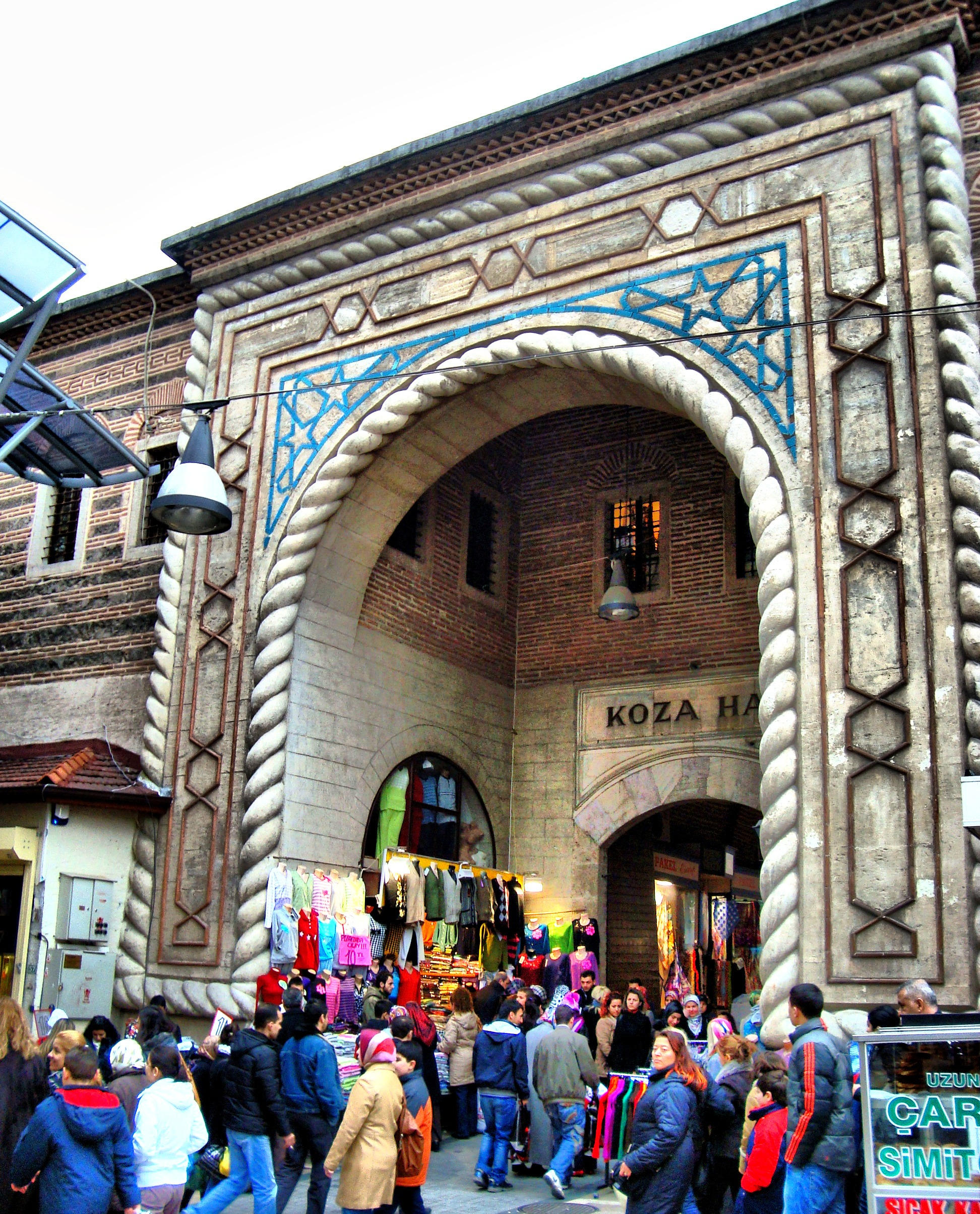
Koza Han Entrance

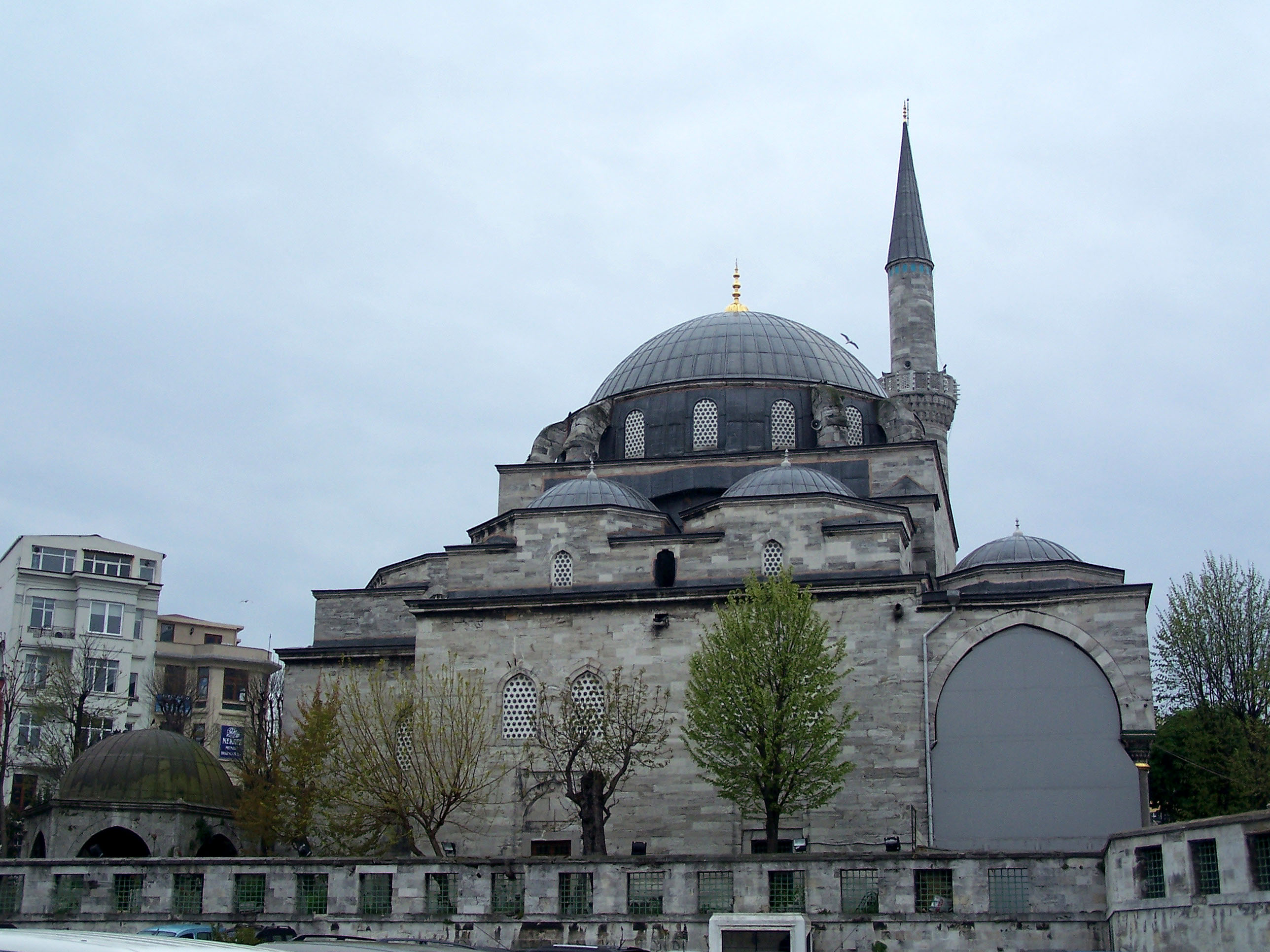
Atik Ali Pasha Mosque, Istanbul (circa 1497)

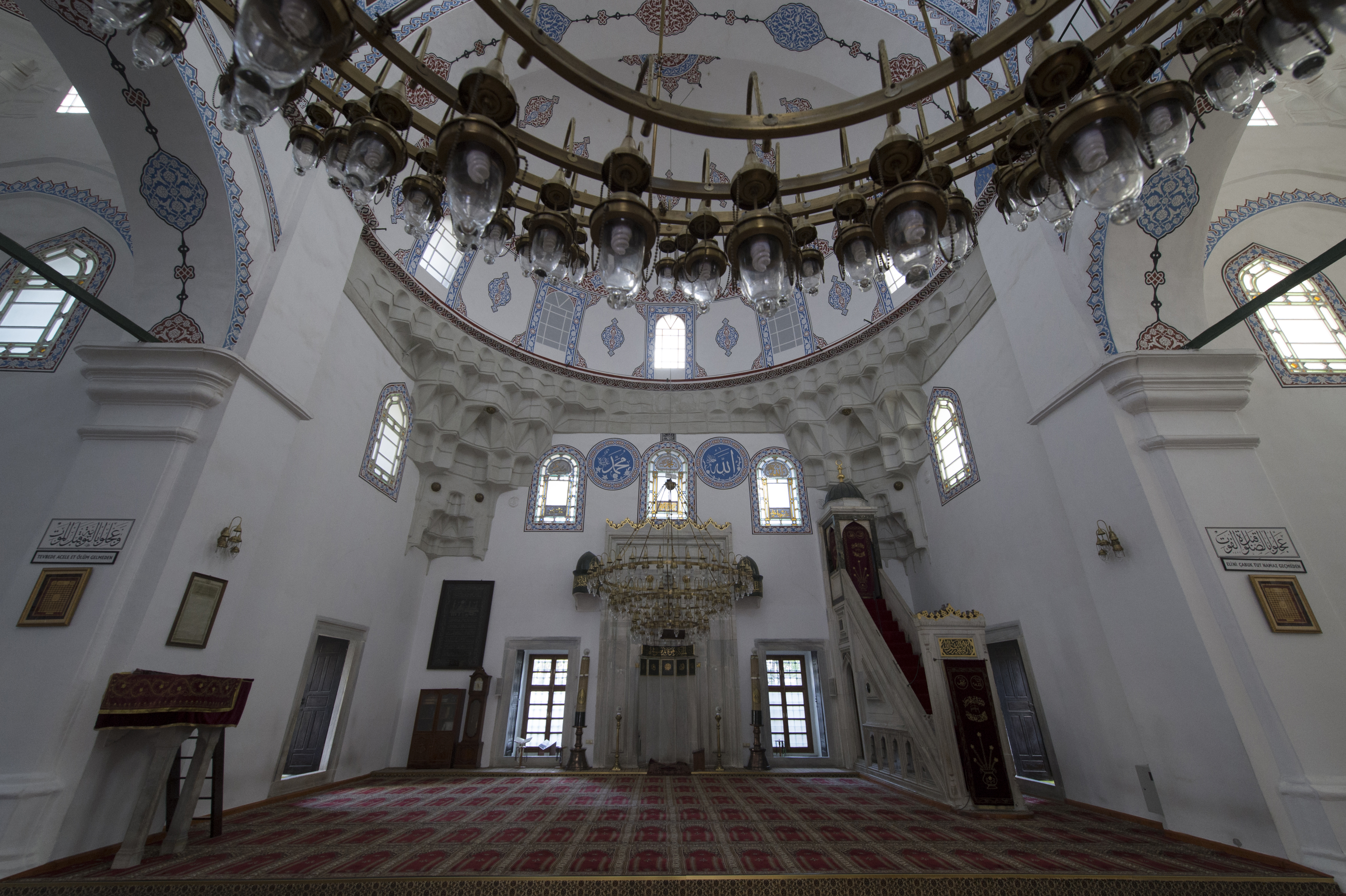
Atik Ali Pasha Mosque interior

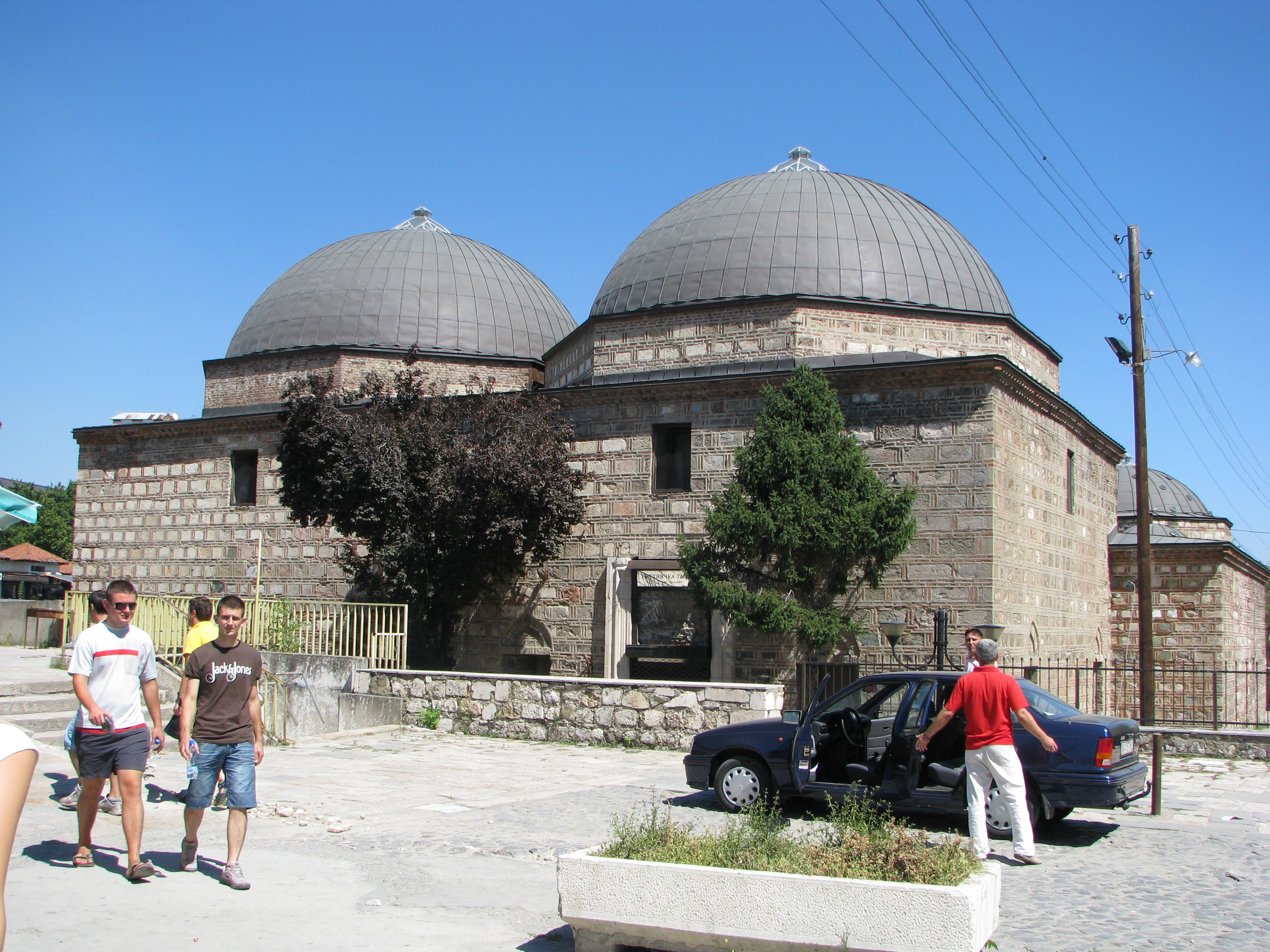
Davud Pasha Hamam in Skopje (second half of 15th century)

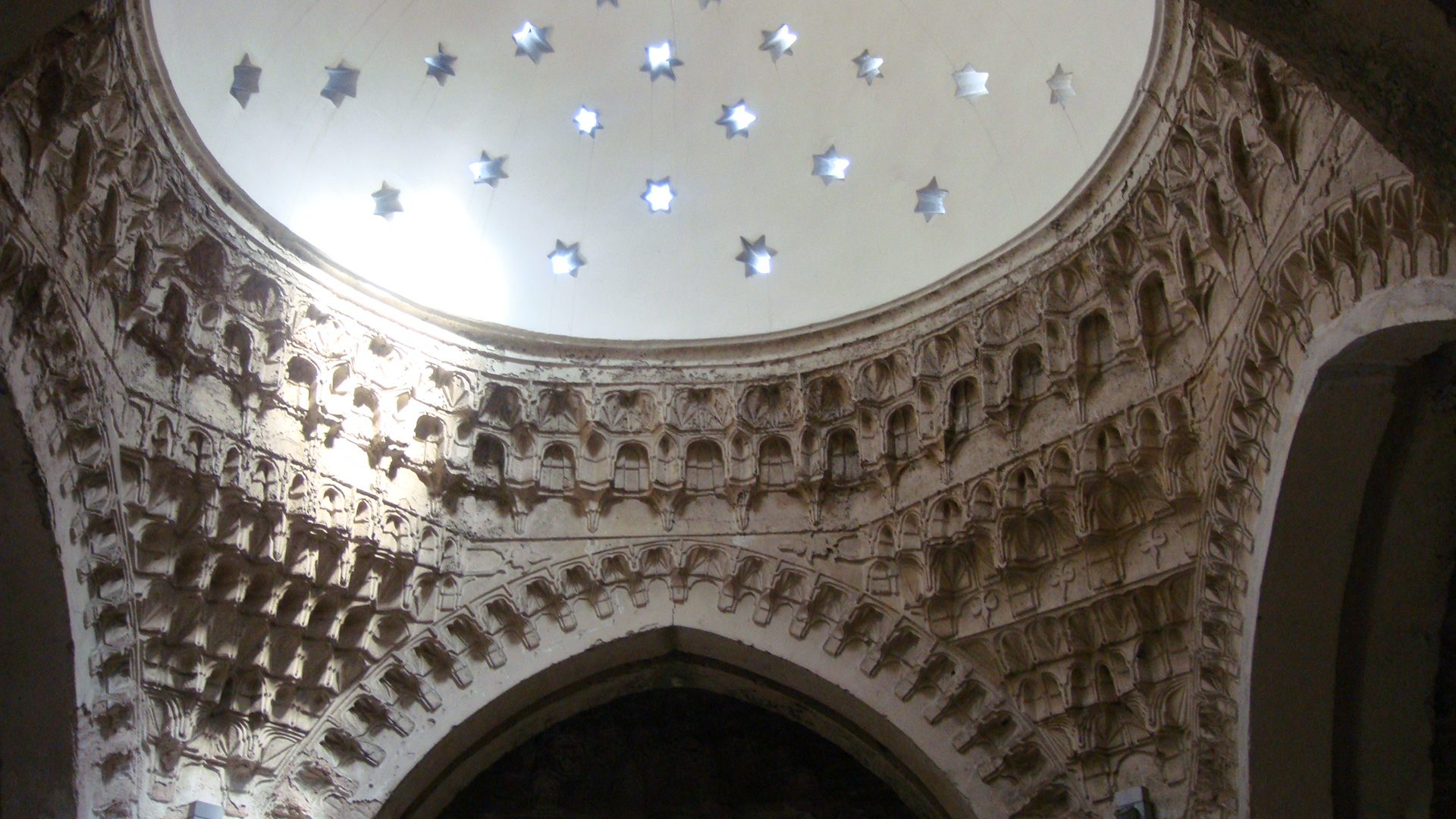
Muqarnas decoration inside the Davud Pasha Hamam

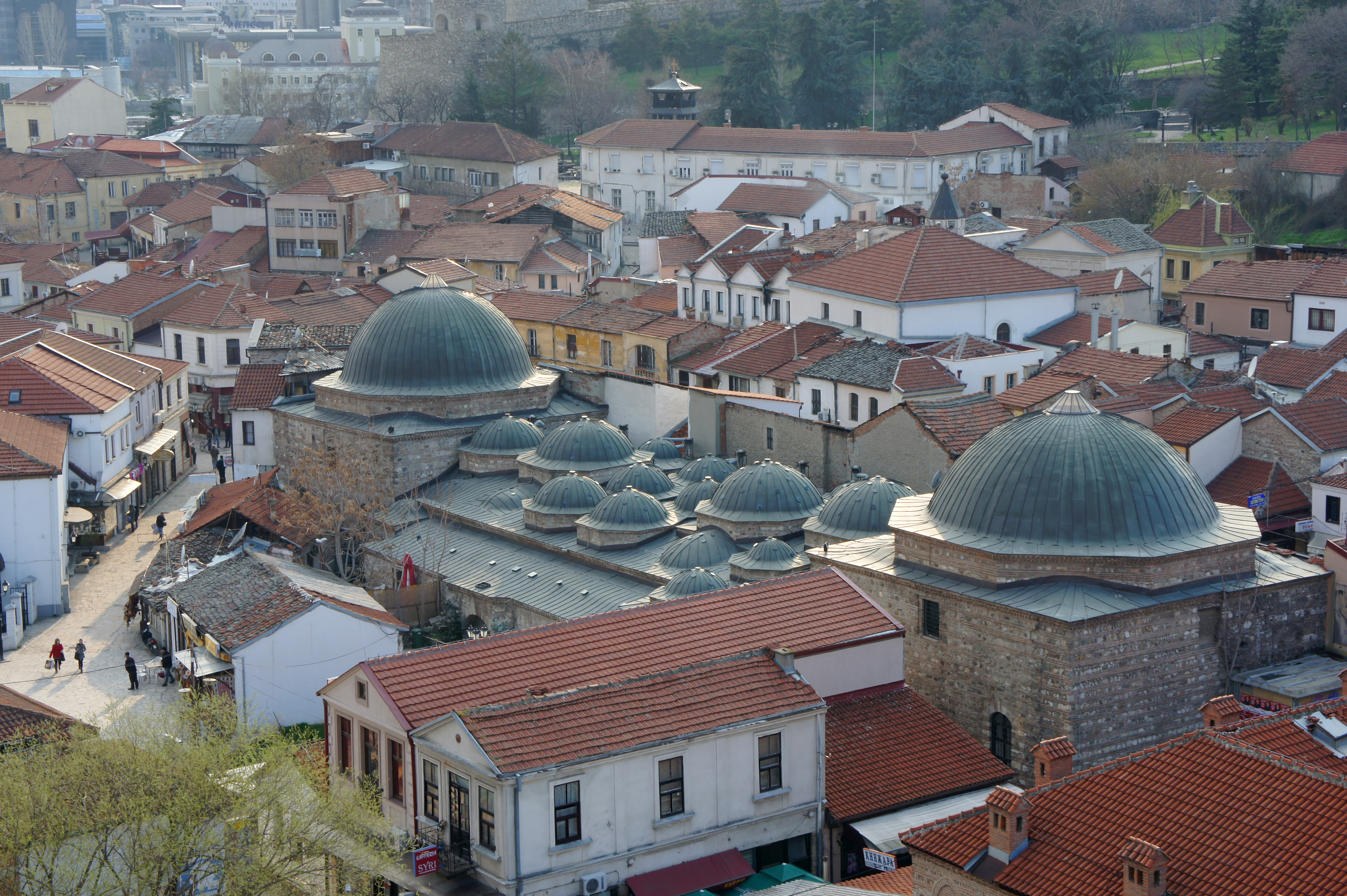
The Çifte Hamam in Skopje (mid-15th century) (domed building in the middle)

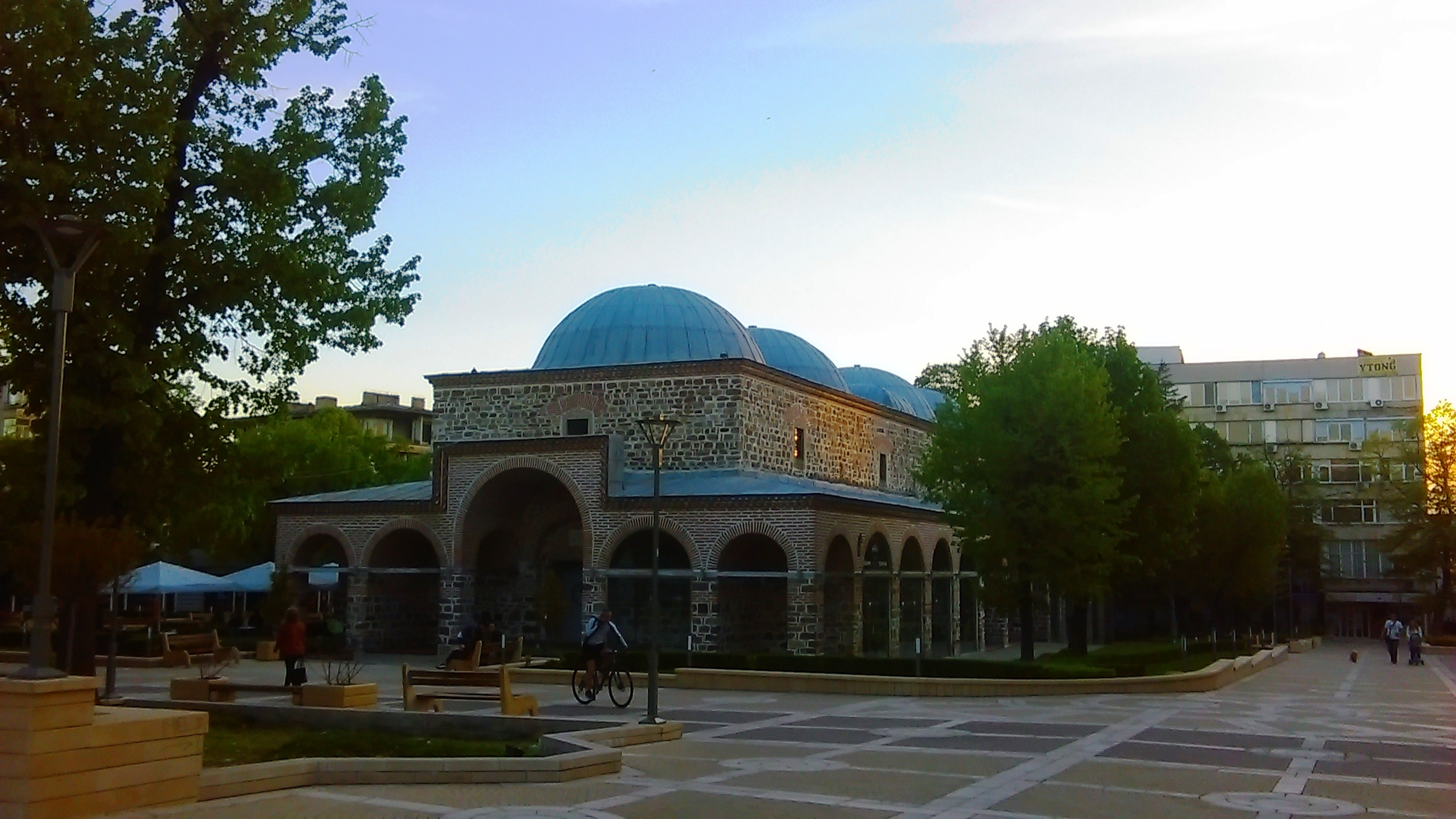
Bedesten in Yambol (beginning of 16th century)

== Later Ottoman architecture ==
The rest of the 16th century is marked by what is commonly known as the "classical" period of Ottoman architecture, which is strongly associated with the works of Mimar Sinan. During this period the bureaucracy of the Ottoman state, whose foundations were laid in Istanbul by Mehmet II, became increasingly elaborate and the profession of the architect became further institutionalized. The long reign of Suleiman the Magnificent is also recognized as the apogee of Ottoman political and cultural development, with extensive patronage in art and architecture by the sultan, his family, and his high-ranking officials. Ottoman architecture in this period, especially under the work and influence of Sinan, saw a new unification and harmonization of the various architectural elements and influences that it had previously absorbed but which had not yet been harmonized into a collective whole. It used a limited set of general forms – such as domes, semi-domes, and arcaded porticos – which were repeated in every structure and could be combined in a limited number of ways. Sinan's most important works in this period include the Şehzade Mosque, Süleymaniye Mosque, and Selimiye Mosque.

== Bibliography ==
- Blair, Sheila S.; Bloom, Jonathan M. (1995). The Art and Architecture of Islam 1250-1800. Yale University Press. ISBN 9780300064650.
- Boykov, Grigor (2013). Mastering the conquered space: resurrection of urban life in Ottoman upper Thrace (14th - 17th c) (Thesis). İhsan Doğramacı Bilkent University (PhD thesis). hdl:11693/15822.
- Carswell, John (2006). Iznik Pottery (Second ed.). British Museum Press. ISBN 9780714124414.
- Freely, John (2011). A History of Ottoman Architecture. WIT Press. ISBN 978-1-84564-506-9.
- Goodwin, Godfrey (1971). A History of Ottoman Architecture. Thames & Hudson. ISBN 0-500-27429-0.
- Kuban, Doğan (2010). Ottoman Architecture. Translated by Mill, Adair. Antique Collectors' Club. ISBN 9781851496044.
- Necipoğlu, Gülru (2011) [2005]. The Age of Sinan: Architectural Culture in the Ottoman Empire (Revised ed.). Reaktion Books. ISBN 9781861892539.
- Öney, Gönül (2002). "Ottoman Tiles and Pottery". In Inalcık, Halil; Renda, Günsel (eds.). Ottoman Civilization. Vol. 2. Ankara: Republic of Turkey, Ministry of Culture. pp. 698–735. ISBN 9751730732.
- Petersen, Andrew (1996). Dictionary of Islamic Architecture. Routledge. ISBN 9781134613663.
- Rüstem, Unver (19 February 2019). Ottoman Baroque: The Architectural Refashioning of Eighteenth-Century Istanbul. Princeton University Press. ISBN 978-0-691-18187-5.
- Sumner-Boyd, Hilary; Freely, John (2010). Strolling Through Istanbul: The Classic Guide to the City (Revised ed.). Tauris Parke Paperbacks.
- Yerasimos, Stéphane (2012). Constantinople: Istanbul's Historical Heritage. Translated by Schreiber, Sally M.; Hoffman, Uta; Loeffler, Ellen (English ed.). H.F.Ullmann. ISBN 9783848000531.
